= Morven, Caithness =

Mountain in Highland, Scotland

Morven
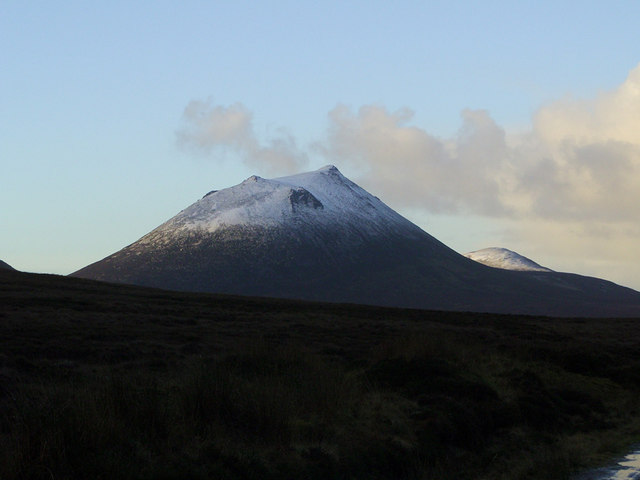
- Morven seen from the northeast

Highest point
- Elevation: 706 m (2,316 ft)
- Prominence: 576 m
- Listing: Graham, Marilyn, County top (Caithness)
- Coordinates: 58°14′2″N 3°41′52″W

Naming
- English translation: Big mountain
- Language of name: Gaelic
- Pronunciation: /ˈmɔːrvɛn/

Geography
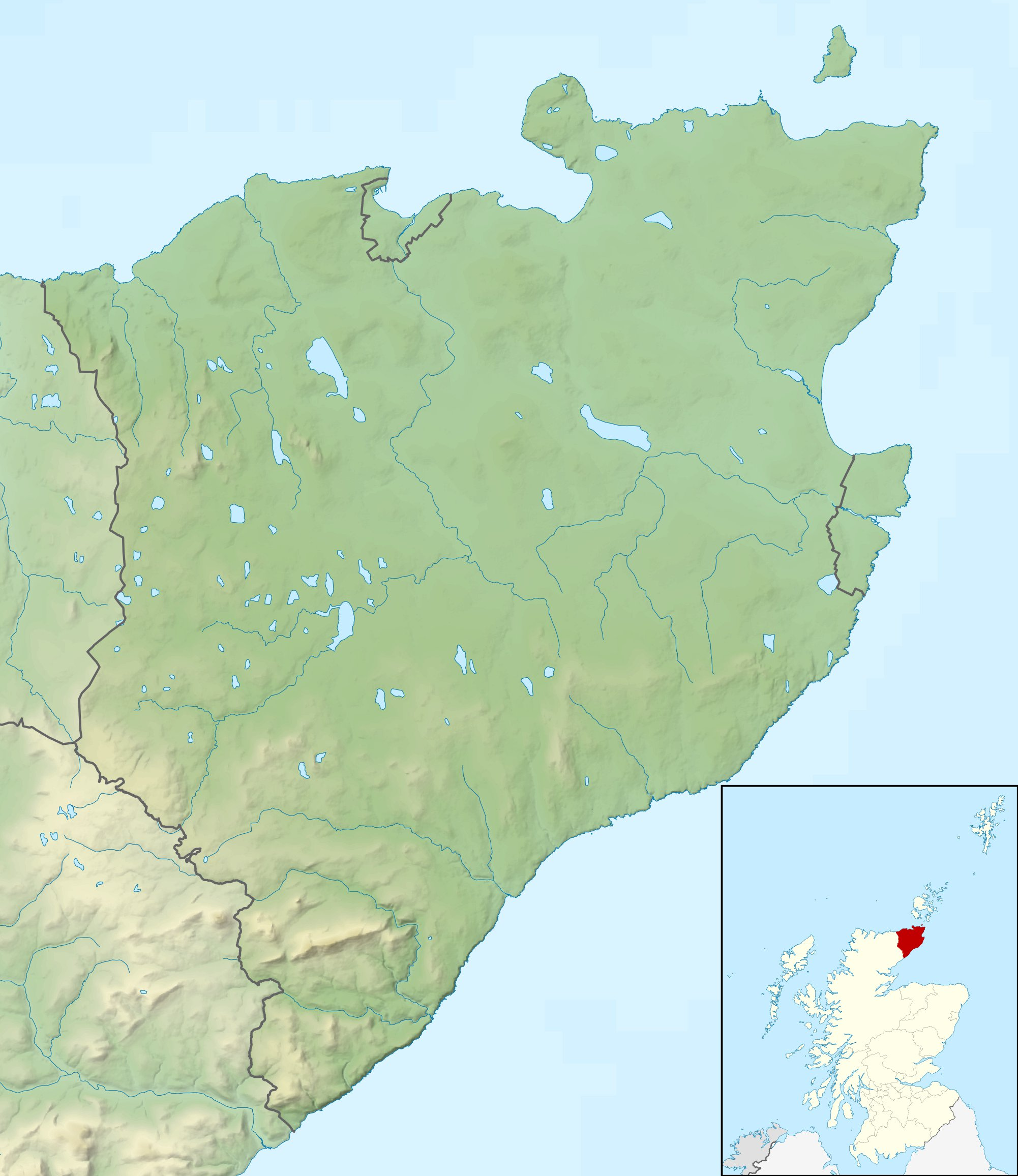
- Location within Caithness
- Location: Caithness, Scotland
- OS grid: ND004285
- Topo map: OS Landranger 17

Morven (Scottish Gaelic: A' Mhòr Bheinn) is a mountain in Caithness, in the Highland Region of Scotland. The mountain is classed as a Graham and, at 706 metres, its summit is the highest point in the county of Caithness.

Morven is part of the Morven and Scaraben Site of Special Scientific Interest (SSSI).

Caithness is generally quite low lying. Morven's relative height and conical appearance makes it a prominent feature of the landscape as seen from many different places in the county. It is among the most prominent of the mountains that can be seen across the Moray Firth from the area surrounding Buckie on clear days. Indeed, a street in the seaside village of Findochty is named Morven Crescent due to its view of the mountain Morven. Buckpool Golf Club's fifth hole is named Morven and Morven View is a not uncommon house name for properties in the Buckie area with a view over the Moray Firth.

There is also a Morven in Aberdeenshire.

Prince George, Duke of Kent, brother of King George VI, died in an air crash on a hillside near Morven on 25 August 1942 while serving in the Royal Air Force.
