= Strathlene =

Coordinates: 57°41′42″N 2°55′13″W

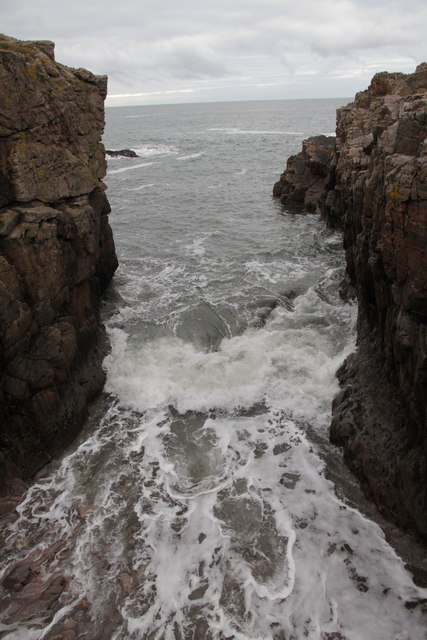

Strathlene (Scottish Gaelic: Srath Eilein) is an area between Buckie and Findochty which noted for its Strathlene Golf Course. It lies along the north coast of Moray.

== History ==
In 1930, this area was developed by then town council expanding the golf course and creating an open-air swimming pool. At one time the Strathlene House Hotel, a former mansion, was a popular local venue with a pleasant beach leading directly off its lawn. Strathlene used to be a popular place to visit for day tourists from the inland towns in the 1930s and 1940s, situated conveniently as it was a mere 300 yards below the Great North of Scotland Railway's Portessie Station and with connecting steps leading down virtually directly from the platform to the seaside.

The hotel was converted into private accommodation as flats in the late 1970s at around the same time as most of the beach had been eroded by longshore drift. The swimming pool had also been closed some years earlier and Strathlene had become rather faded.
