= Buckie =

Town on Moray Firth, Scotland

Coordinates: 57°40′35″N 2°57′54″W

Buckie: Scottish Gaelic: Bucaidh
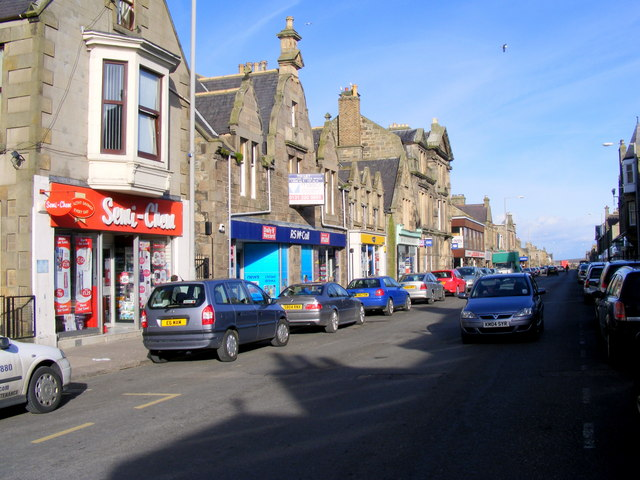
- East Church Street looking eastwards

- Location within Moray
- Population: 9,010 (2020)
- OS grid reference: NJ425655
- Civil parish: Rathven
- Council area: Moray
- Lieutenancy area: Banffshire
- Country: Scotland
- Sovereign state: United Kingdom
- Post town: BUCKIE
- Postcode district: AB56
- Dialling code: 01542
- Police: Scotland
- Fire: Scottish
- Ambulance: Scottish
- UK Parliament: Aberdeenshire North and Moray East
- Scottish Parliament: Banffshire and Buchan Coast

Buckie (Scottish Gaelic: Bucaidh) is a burgh town (defined as such in 1888) on the Moray Firth coast of Scotland. Historically in Banffshire, Buckie was the largest town in the county until the administrative area was abolished in 1975. The town is the third largest in the Moray council area after Elgin and Forres and within the definitions of statistics published by the General Register Office for Scotland was ranked at number 75 in the list of population estimates for settlements in Scotland mid-year 2006. Buckie is virtually equidistant from Banff to the east and Elgin to the west, with both approximately 17 miles (27 kilometres) distant, whilst Keith lies 12 mi (19 km) to the south by road.

== Etymology ==
The origin of the name of the town is not entirely clear. Although the folk etymology is that Buckie is named after a seashell (genus buccinum) the shared marine background is most likely a coincidence. The name Buckie would not have originally identified a place immediately adjacent to the sea, so alternative etymological sources are more likely. Unfortunately, in one of the earlier books on Scottish place names, Buckie on the Moray Firth does not receive a mention. However, a Buckie in the Balquhidder district of Perthshire is described as being derived from the Gaelic word boc or Welsh bowk, both meaning a buck or male deer. This suggests the meaning of Buckie as place where male deer gather, possibly referring to the valley of what is known today as the Buckie Burn.

== History ==
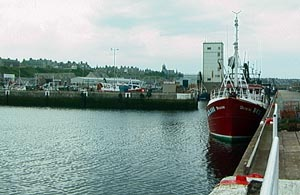
Cluny Harbour, with town in background

A 1936 article by a Dr Cramond discusses the earliest mention of Buckie dating from 1362, when the lands of Rove Bucky in le Awne were leased by John Hay to John Young, vicar of Fordyce. The Hays, from whom the Rannes family were descended, had acquired through Royal favour a footing in the district at a still earlier age when the greater part from the Deveron to the Spey was embraced in the Forest of Awne or Ainie (now Enzie) and the Boyne. Rove Bucky is far from understandable and could be a scribe's error and should perhaps read Over Bucky as occurs in older title deeds, in distinction to Nether Buckie. It has been spelt in different ways, Robert Burns calling it Bucky in his song Lady Onlie - Honest Lucky as was common at the end of the 18th century.

Robert Gordon's map Aberdeen, Banf, Murrey &c. to Inverness: [and] Fra the north water to Ross, which is dated at some time between 1636 and 1652, shows Buckie in its own right as a community some small distance from the coast with the community of Freuchny sitting nearer the shore to the north. Robert Gordon and Joan Blaeu's Duo Vicecomitatus Aberdonia & Banfia, una cum Regionibus & terrarum tractibus sub iis comprehensis published in Amsterdam 1654 clearly shows Buckie and Freuchny with the addition of Nether Buckie. James Robertson's Topographical and military map of the counties of Aberdeen, Banff and Kincardine, London, 1822 seems geographically inaccurate in its relative positioning of Buckie, Nether Buckie and Freuchny, but is significant in that the new label of Rotten Slough is given equal importance in terms of size of community with Buckie; however, in Thomson’s Atlas of Scotland, Edinburgh, 1832 Rotten Slough is fairly unimportant by size so one of these two reference publications is distorted, probably the former. This community, which would later come to be known as Portessie, was reportedly formed when "Porteasie.....became a fishing station in 1727, when 5 houses were built by the proprietor of Rannes for the accommodation of the original fishers from Findhorn". The 1731 Rathven Session Minutes shows that Rotten Slough had a population of 40 with ten households while the 1791 entry records 177 persons in 44 households.

By the time of the publication of the 1891 First Series Ordnance Survey Map of Elgin, which reflects the 1866-1870 survey, Buckie had developed markedly, with areas named Seatown, Newtown, Ianstown and Portessie. The 19th-century OS Six Inch series further shows Gordonsburgh, Craig Bow and Strathlene. The 1910 OS 3rd Edition one-inch map of Elgin settled on the name of Ianstown, and all other parts of Buckie are named as they are known today, but the Bartholomew Survey Atlas of Scotland, Edinburgh, 1912 uses the label Ianston. The conflicting nomenclature continued with the issue of the 1929 OS One-inch Popular edition and the 1933 JG Bartholomew & Son, Half-inch to the Mile maps of Scotland.

Reporting on Portessie, Buckie and Portgordon in 1911, the Annual Report of the Fishery Board states: "The majority of fishermen at these creeks are seldom at home longer than to repair their boats for the different herring fishings throughout the year, working from the principal centres in Scotland, England and Ireland. The fishermen are in a prosperous condition". The principal kinds of fish landed in Buckie for that year were herrings and all kinds of white fish.

Fishery Statistics

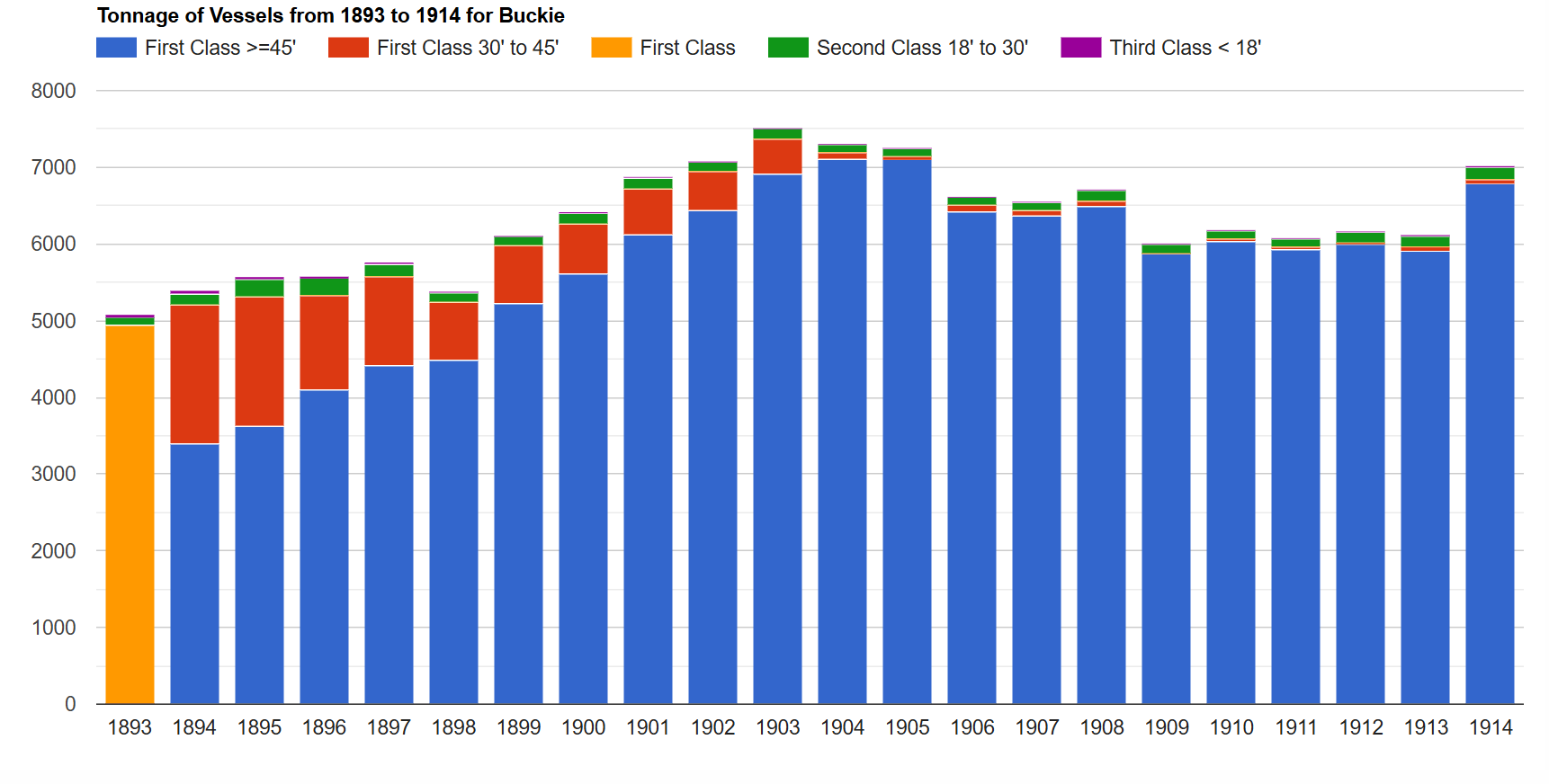
Tonnage of vessels

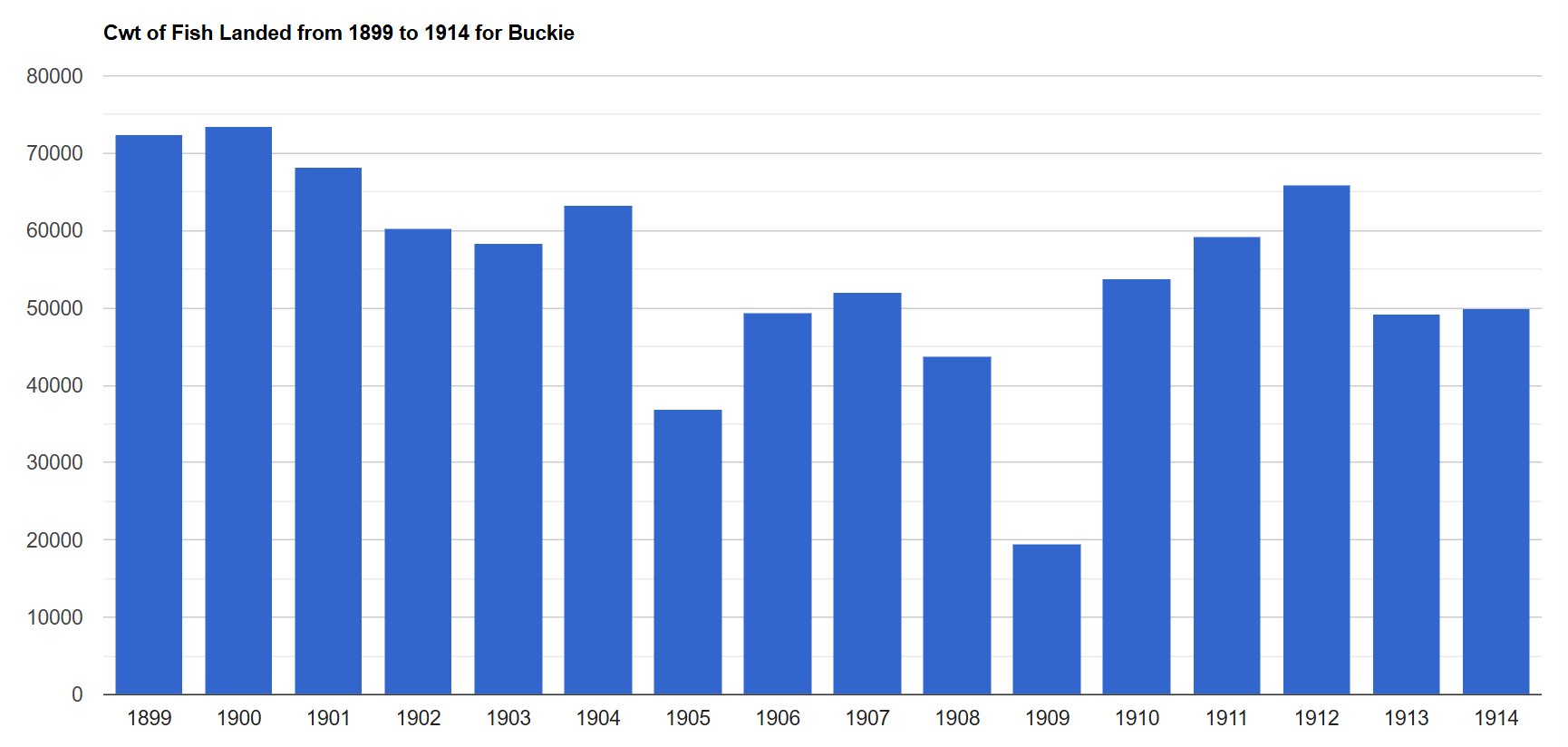
Cwt of fish landed

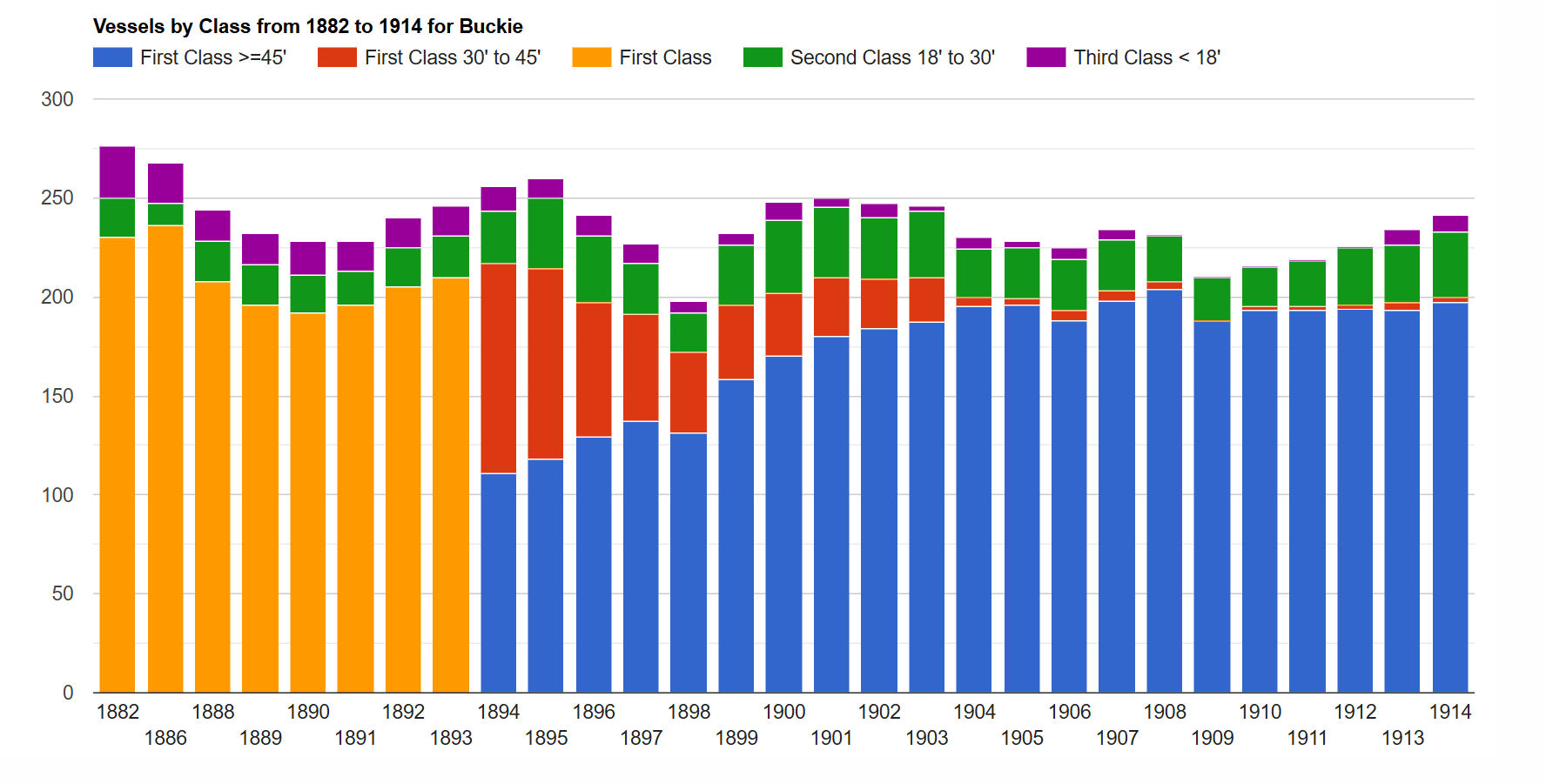
Vessels by class

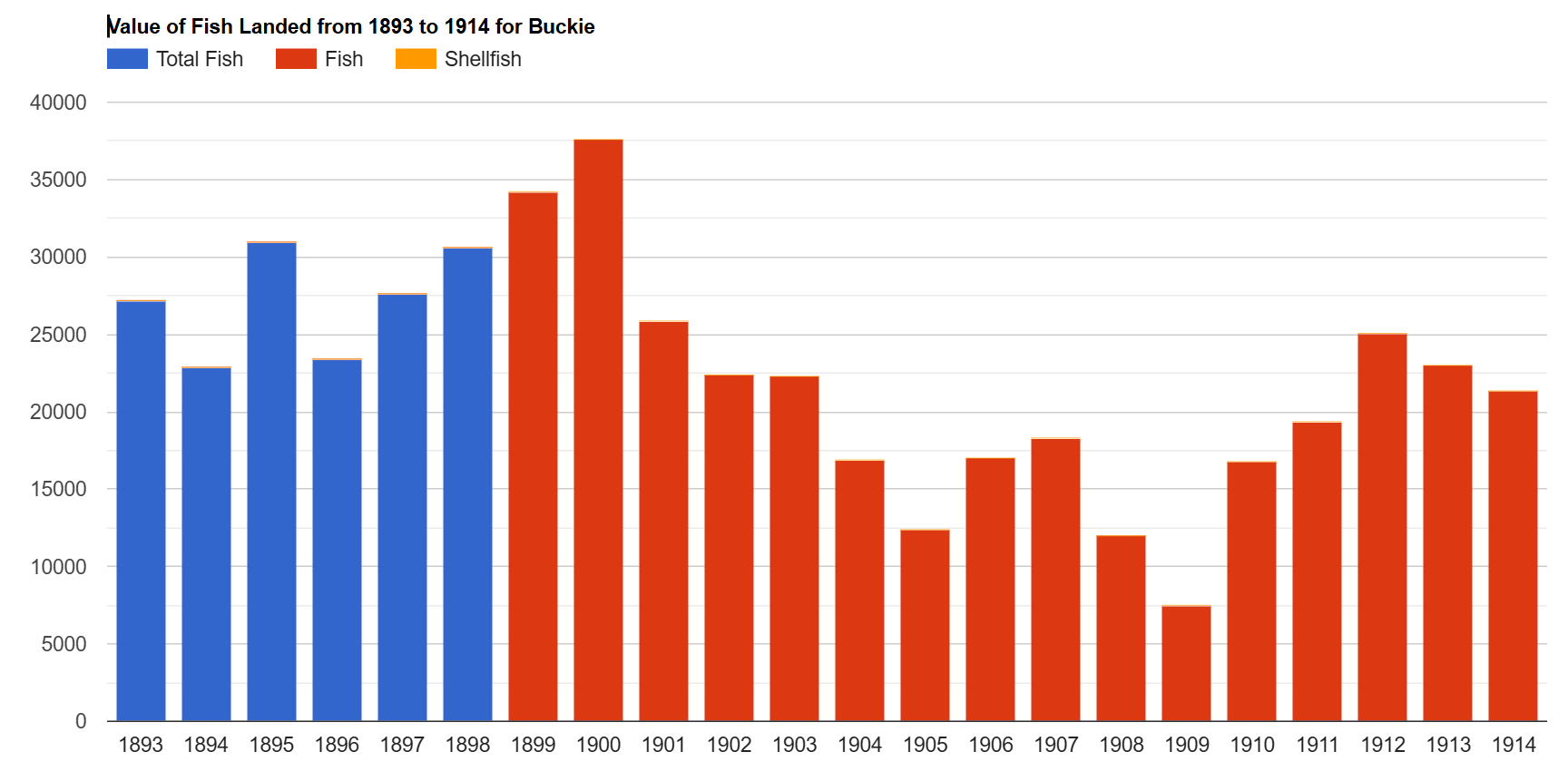
Value (£) of fish landed

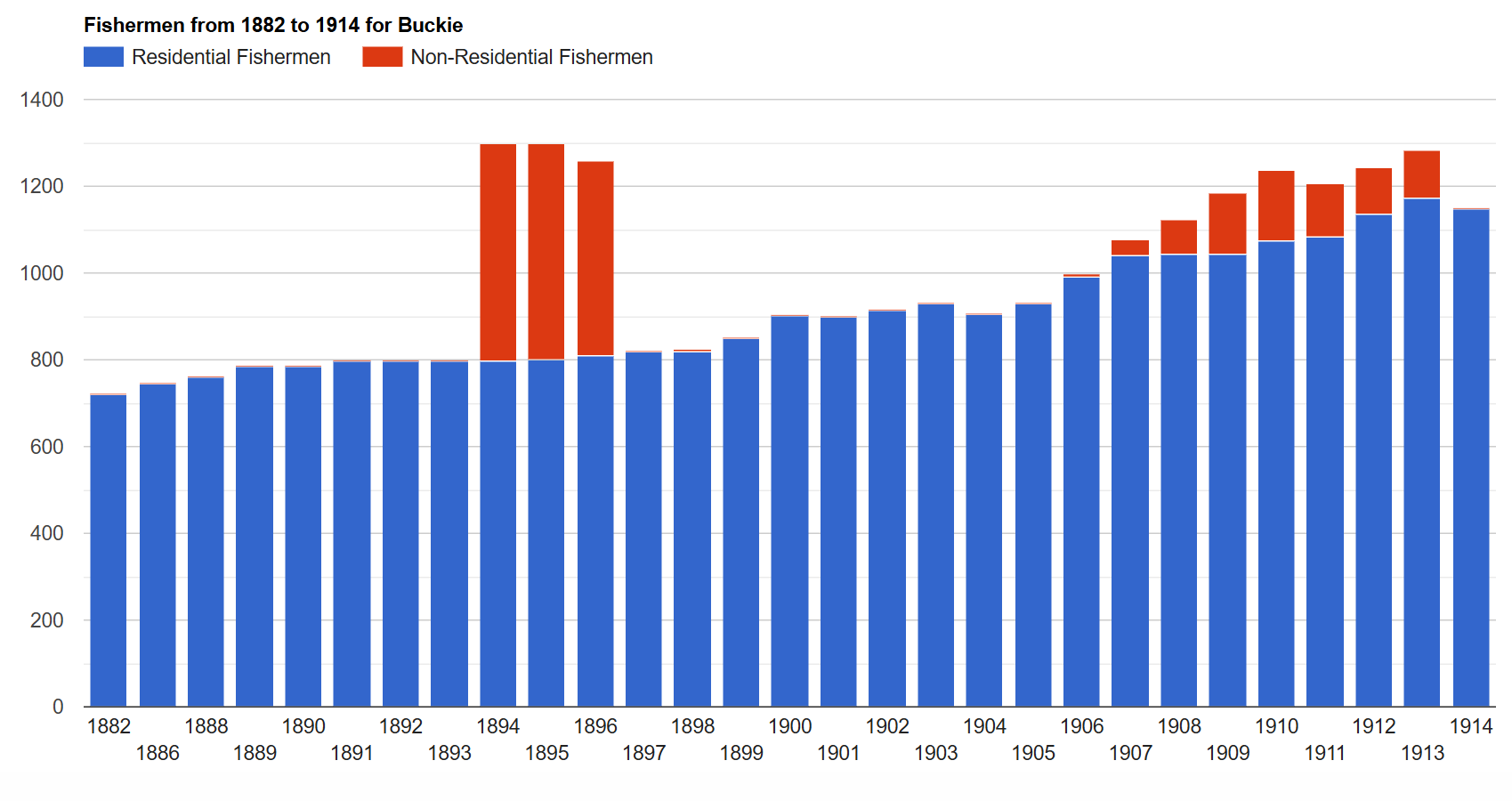
Fishermen

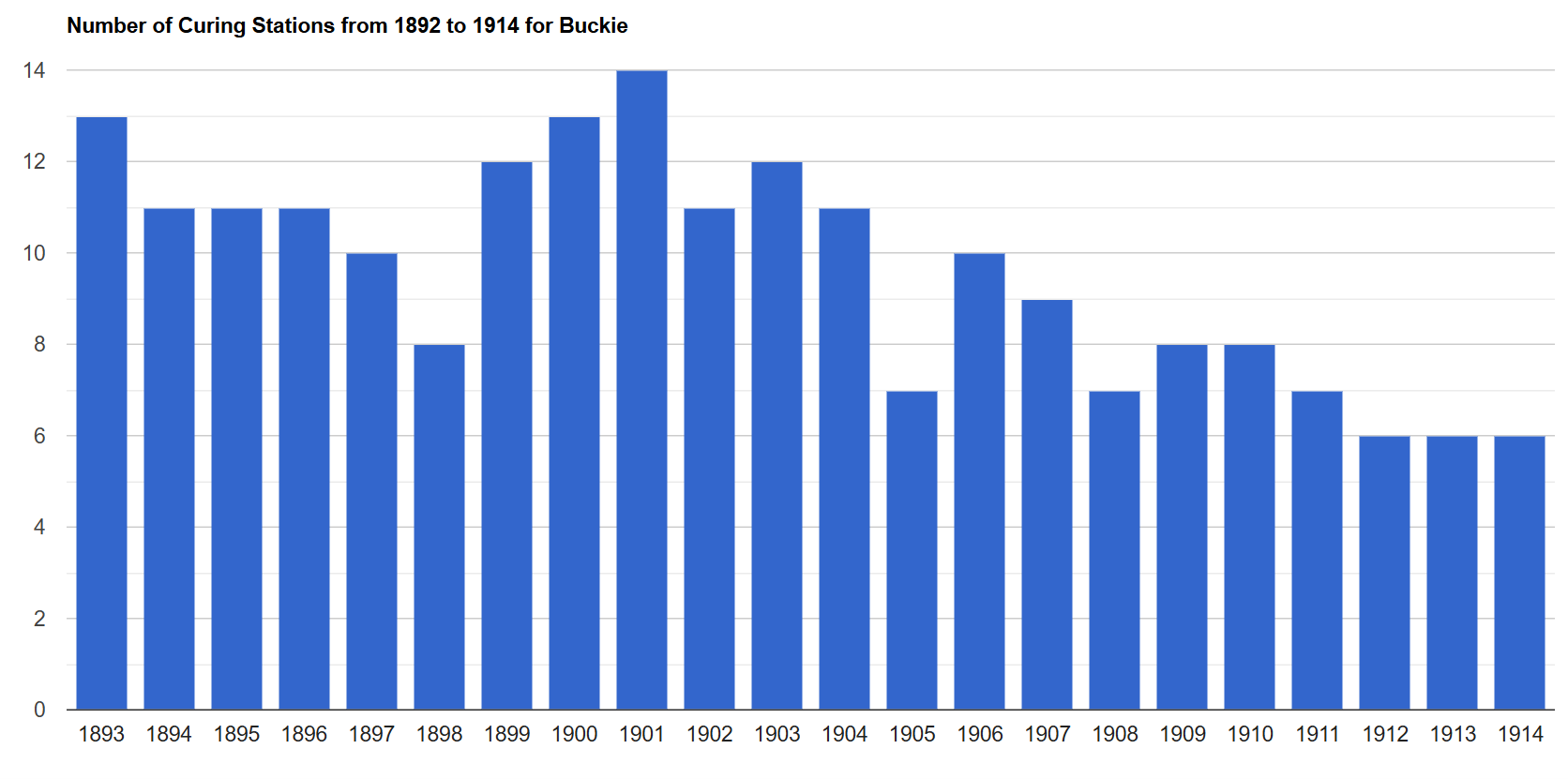
Number of curing stations

== Geography ==
The town lies on the Moray coast, around five miles east of the mouth of the River Spey. On the eastern side it largely comes to an end against the Freuchny burn, whilst the more central Buckie Burn divides Buckie and Buckpool. Buckie comprises numerous former separate fishing villages, each of which retain their own name and character. Buckie itself is the central part of the community lying between the Victoria Bridge under which flows the Buckie Burn at the western end of West Church Street, the eastern end of Cluny Harbour and above the shore area. West of the Buckie Burn is Buckpool, which was formerly known as Nether Buckie, and on the shoreline, west of Cluny Harbour, there is the Yardie. Immediately above the Yardie on the Buckie side of the burn is Seatown. To the west of the Yardie is Harbourhead. To the east of Cluny Harbour lie Ianstown, Gordonsburgh and Portessie also known locally as The Sloch (historically The Rotten Slough), which reaches towards Strathlene.

=== Climate ===
Climate data for Buckie
Month	Jan	Feb	Mar	Apr	May	Jun	Jul	Aug	Sep	Oct	Nov	Dec	Year
Mean daily maximum °C (°F)	6.7 (44.1)	7.1 (44.8)	9.0 (48.2)	11.2 (52.2)	14.0 (57.2)	16.2 (61.2)	18.5 (65.3)	18.3 (64.9)	16.0 (60.8)	12.7 (54.9)	9.2 (48.6)	6.7 (44.1)	12.1 (53.9)
Mean daily minimum °C (°F)	1.6 (34.9)	1.4 (34.5)	2.3 (36.1)	3.9 (39.0)	5.5 (41.9)	8.2 (46.8)	10.1 (50.2)	10.4 (50.7)	8.9 (48.0)	6.5 (43.7)	3.9 (39.0)	1.7 (35.1)	5.4 (41.7)
Average precipitation mm (inches)	53 (2.1)	46 (1.8)	50 (2.0)	48 (1.9)	50 (2.0)	61 (2.4)	60 (2.4)	63 (2.5)	73 (2.9)	84 (3.3)	73 (2.9)	55 (2.2)	716 (28.2)
Average precipitation days (≥ 1.0 mm)	16.5	13.7	13.7	11.8	11.7	11.1	11.8	12.5	12.7	16.6	17.5	16.0	165.6
Mean monthly sunshine hours	46.5	86.8	108.5	148.8	192.2	164.3	151.9	145.7	117.8	89.9	58.9	37.2	1,348.5
Source: Gazetteer for Scotland

== Population and demography ==
The 2021 UK Census reported that, of Buckie's total population, 84.2% were born in Scotland, with the largest single minority being those born in England (9.76%). In terms of declared ethnicity, the largest was "White Scottish", at 84.25%.

Population

Males: 4380 - 48.34%
Females: 4681 - 51.66%
Total: 9061

Age structure (%)

0 – 4 years: 5.3
5 – 15 years: 12.9
16 – 29 years: 15.0
30 – 44 years: 18.5
45 – 59 years: 20.3
60 – 74 years: 16.9
75+ years: 11.1

Religion (%)

Church of Scotland: 19.03
Roman Catholic: 4.98
Other Christian: 8.05
Muslim: 0.33
Buddhist: 0.21
Hindu: 0.12
Jewish: 0.04
Sikh: 0.06
Pagan: 0.28
Other: 0.36
None: 60.90
Not stated: 5.71

Country of birth (%)

Scotland: 84.20
England: 9.76
Wales: 0.46
Northern Ireland: 0.25
UK part not specified: 0.04
Republic of Ireland: 0.04
European Union: 2.96
Other Europe: 0.24
Africa: 0.42
Americas and the Caribbean: 0.45
Middle East and Asia: 0.90
Antarctica and Oceania and Other: 0.18

Ethnic group (%)

White Scottish: 84.25
White Other British: 9.79
White Irish: 0.14
White Other: 2.30
White Polish: 0.95
Asian, Asian Scottish or Asian British: 1.09
African: 0.23
Caribbean: 0.1

Source: https://www.scotlandscensus.gov.uk/ Scotland's Census, 2021 Census data

== Politics ==
=== National governments ===
Formerly part of the Moray constituency from 1983 to 2024, Buckie is now in the Aberdeenshire North and Moray East constituency for the UK Parliament, which returned the SNP MP Seamus Logan as its Member of Parliament in the 2024 General Election.

Buckie is in the Banffshire and Buchan Coast constituency of the Scottish Parliament. The seat was represented by SNP MSP Stewart Stevenson from 2011 until 2021 and by SNP MSP Karen Adam since the Scottish Parliament election of 2021. The constituency is also part of the North East Scotland electoral region.

=== Local government ===
Following the reorganisation of local government in Scotland, Buckie now has a multi-member ward with 3 councillors.

Additionally, there is the Buckie Community Council, which allows for 12 members to be elected or co-opted.

== Transport ==
=== Road ===
Buckie is situated near the A98 primary road, which connects Fraserburgh with Fochabers at the junction of the A96. The A98 runs east–west, approximately parallel with the southern edge of Buckie. The A942 starts at "The Toll Bar" and runs due north from the A98 into Buckie becoming High Street and then North High Street before swinging east as Low Street, along the harbour as Commercial Road and onwards as Rathburn Street, Reidhaven Street and finally Great Eastern Road out of town towards Findochty and Portknockie. Where the A942 swings east, the A990 commences to the west and heads past The Yardie and onwards as Main Street and then Great Western Road towards Portgordon. The nearest railway station is at Keith serving the Aberdeen-Inverness line. Bus services operate to Aberdeen, Macduff and Elgin. A connecting service to Keith railway station was withdrawn when Moray Council funding ceased in September 2013, but it resumed in 2022 following local pressure.

=== Golden age of the railway ===
Historically, Buckie had extensive rail connections with the rest of North East Scotland. The Great North of Scotland Railway was laid out in the 1850s and served the Aberdeen to Inverness route until it was decommissioned in the late 1960s. This construction did not reach the coast until Nairn and various branch lines were built to link the peripheral areas to the mainline service.

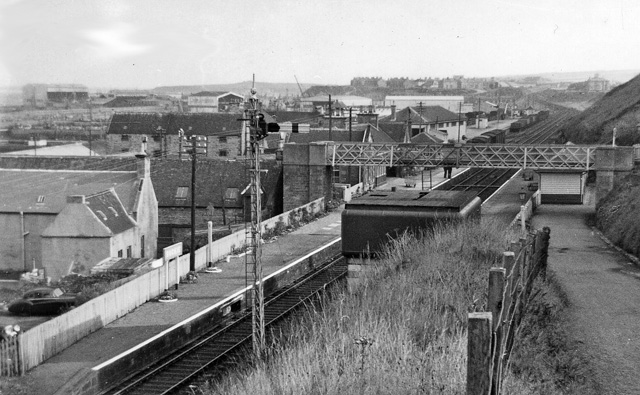
Buckie railway station in 1961

In 1923, GNSR was absorbed into the London and North Eastern Railway before that itself was nationalised along with all other UK rail services into British Rail in 1948.

The Moray Coast Railway was also constructed by GNSR and the part of it that served Buckie, opening in 1886, ran from Cairnie near Keith down to the coast at Portsoy and then swung west through Cullen, Portknockie and Findochty reaching its first stop in Buckie at Portessie. This station was built directly on top of the cliff and commanded panoramic views over the Strathlene House Hotel, Strathlene outdoor swimming pool and beach and onward to the offshore rocks of Craigenroan and the Moray Firth. Indeed, a footpath led from the station down to the hotel and beach area and a visit to Strathlene was a popular day out by train before and during World War II. In 1936 Buckie Town Council proposed to change the name of the station to Strathlene but LNER declined suggesting instead that the Town Council erect their own large sign on Strathlene Golf Course that could be seen from the train. A retired passenger carriage was available for rent at the station. 1 mile (1.6 km) to the west was Buckie Station, which was located below the cliff and virtually across the street from Buckie Fish Market. To reach Buckie Station the railway gently descended to the west from the heights of Portessie on an embankment to the foot of the cliff whilst the parallel road lying adjacent to the track on its southern flank rose to the west up the McLaren's Brae end of East Church Street to the town centre. 1 mile (1.6 km) further west stood Buckpool Station and from there the line continued due west to Portgordon and onward to Spey Bay before crossing the River Spey and swinging inland to rejoin the mainline service at Elgin. Buckie was served by these three railway stations until 1968 when the line was finally closed.

It is possible to walk or cycle along the route of the old railway from Cullen to Garmouth. This walk takes in the Cullen viaduct from which views of that town can be had and, at the other end, the Spey Bridge.

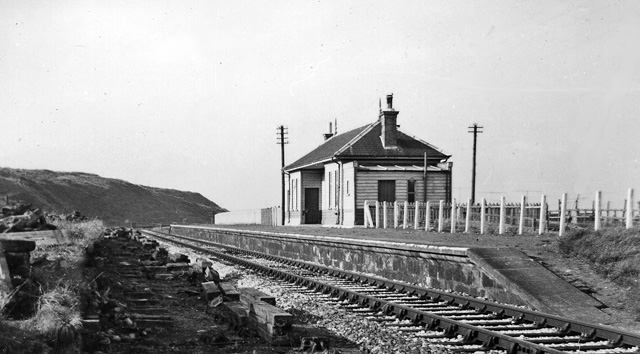
Remains of Buckpool station in 1961

Portessie was also terminus to the Buckie and Portessie Branch of the Highland Railway. This line was opened in 1884 and provided a direct rail link "up the hill" to Keith. The line ran westwards from Portessie but remained on top of the cliff, passing the Pot O' Linn, skirting the rear of Cliff Terrace and crossing Harbour Street then swinging south contributing to the curve of Mill Crescent to stop at Buckie Highland Station before continuing up present day Millbank Terrace towards Rathven. Until recent years this latter section was used as a footpath and commonly known as "The Highland Line" – it was quite possible to cycle from Millbank Terrace to the site of Rathven Station as late as the 1970s and even early 1980s – but housing development and farming interests have contributed to the virtual closure of this popular route to Peter Fair Park. The line passed under a road bridge of what is now the A98, which has long since been demolished, and then turned westwards again towards Drybridge and made another sweep to the south as it passed Enzie and then headed uphill, over the Enzie Braes, to Aultmore and on to Keith. This link was relatively short-lived and was closed in 1915 except for a freight service between Buckie and Portessie, which was closed in 1944.

== As a port ==
The industrial centre of Buckie is based around Cluny Harbour. This port was built by the Cluny family in 1877 to replace the town's first stone harbour in Nether Buckie, which was constructed in 1857 1 mile (2 km) west but had a tendency to silt up and become unusable. The Laird of Letterfourie contributed £5,000 of the construction costs at Nether Buckie but the main investor with the balance of £10,000 was the Board of Fisheries. The engineers were D.& T. Stevenson of Edinburgh, the family firm of the author Robert Louis Stevenson. It was and remains a very sturdily built edifice with the main walls of considerable thickness being built of quartzite, quarried locally at Strathlene, capped with a very hard type of sandstone, which was also used to form the walls at the entrance and of the harbour proper. As regards stability the harbour has remained a monument to engineering science with very little maintenance ever being necessary. It had a design fault, however, in that the entrance opened to the northeast and was subject to infill with shingle, moving westwards by longshore drift. Later known as Buckpool Harbour, this earlier port became something of an eyesore and eventually the silted basin became overgrown and dangerously swampy. The decision was taken to fill in the basin and this work was undertaken in the 1970s. The resulting park includes a pebble beach and the original quartzite harbour walls remain completely intact. Cluny Harbour was built by the Cluny family in 1877 at a cost of £60,000: at the time it was one of the finest harbours in Scotland.

== Industry ==
Although Buckie was once a thriving fishing and shipbuilding port, these industries have declined. Though Peterhead and Aberdeen are now more often associated with the fishing industry in northeast Scotland, in 1913 Buckie had the largest steam drifter fleet in Scotland. Food processing remains important, with large fish factories and smoke houses found around the harbour. Buckie can properly be regarded as one of the main points of origin of the modern Scottish shellfish industry. A Mancunian, Charles Eckersley, who moved to Buckie in the 1950s and started trading as a fish merchant, noticed that shellfish such as prawns and scallops were regarded as economically useless by Buckie fishing vessels but were the same species that he had enjoyed whilst completing his National Service in Palestine. He seized the opportunity to exploit this gap in the market and he built a thriving processing and packing business.

The Buckie Shipyard now repairs and refits RNLI lifeboats for much of the United Kingdom and operates service contracts for various other clients including the MoD as well as building new vessels but boatbuilding was a major industry in the town for decades. Until recent years there were three separate boatyards building traditional wooden clinker fishing vessels. Heading down North High Street, the view of the sea would have been interrupted by a huge grey corrugated iron shed. This was Thomsons, from which vessels were launched directly into the Moray Firth from a slipway. Heading east to Cluny Harbour was Herd and Mackenzie on the fourth or lifeboat basin of the harbour. Directly behind their large sheds and across Blantyre Terrace was Jones with their private harbour into which they launched their vessels. Thomsons is gone but the premises of Herd and McKenzie and Jones are part of the modern day Buckie Shipyard. It was Herd and McKenzie, a firm with its roots in Dunbartonshire from where Messrs Herd and Mackenzie sortied north, which built and launched the training schooner Captain Scott in 1972. At the time of its launch, this vessel was the largest of its type in the world. In earlier years, there were further boat construction operations dotted along the shoreline from The Yardie to Ianstown and on to Portessie but these had mostly been amalgamated into the three main firms or had gone out of business by the interwar period.

A significant part of the population works in the offshore oil industry, although Buckie somewhat missed the boat with the North Sea boom. In the late 1970s, there were extensive plans drawn up to extend Cluny Harbour out to the Mucks reef with the intention of serving oilfield supply vessels. Nothing came of this but every now and then the idea rears its head once more to be met with great enthusiasm before failing to get off the ground again.

Buckie was home to a specialist electric lamp factory of Thorn EMI until 1987 when it was closed and production moved to a new plant in Leicestershire. All of the predominantly female staff were offered jobs at the new facility in the East Midlands but, as the vast majority of the labour force were second wage earners in families, this offer was almost universally rejected.

Buckie is home to the Inchgower Distillery, which sits 1 mile (2 km) or so inland from the town and is best known for the Inchgower Single Malt.

== Religion ==
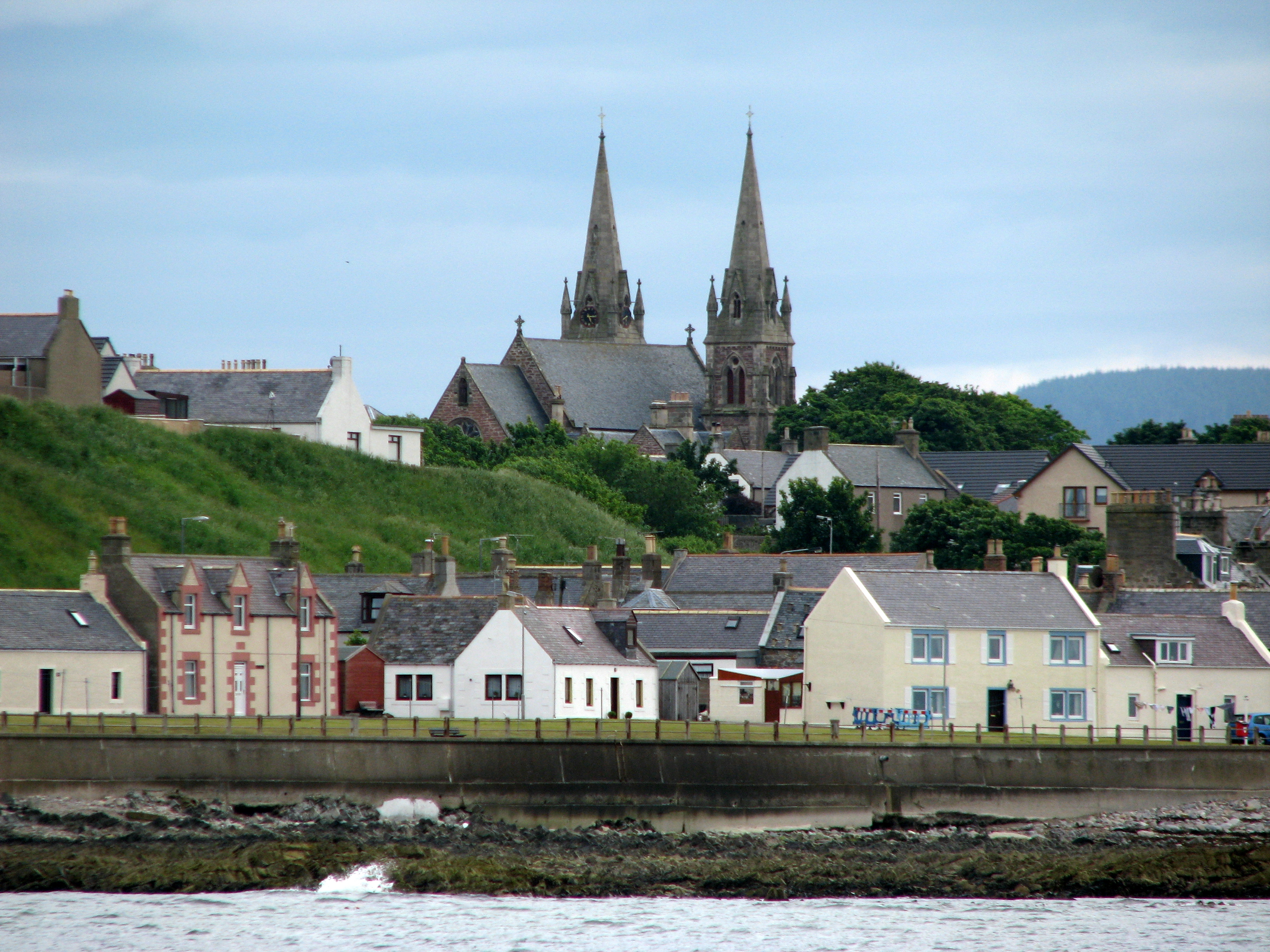
St Peter's, Buckie, as seen from offshore between Cluny and Buckpool harbours

As a traditional fishing community, Buckie had an active religious life, and thus has numerous churches representing almost every branch of Northern European Christianity. The largest church is St. Peter's, which stands on St. Andrews Square in Buckpool. This twin-spired red sandstone construction was originally planned to act as the cathedral for the Roman Catholic Diocese of Aberdeen when it was opened in 1857. This never came to pass and Buckie was left with what is arguably one of the grandest churches in NE Scotland outside of Aberdeen. The basis of this reasoning was that the Roman Catholic population per capita in the area around Buckie was one of the highest in post-Reformation Scotland. St. Gregory's, built at Preshome near Buckie in 1788, was the first post-Reformation church to be built in Scotland that looked like a church – prior to that date post-Reformation Roman Catholics worshiped in clandestine churches designed to look anonymous. These sometimes resembled farm buildings or ordinary houses, a superbly preserved example of this is St. Ninian's (1775) at Tynet about 4 mi (6 km) to the west of Buckie, which looks like a long, low barn.

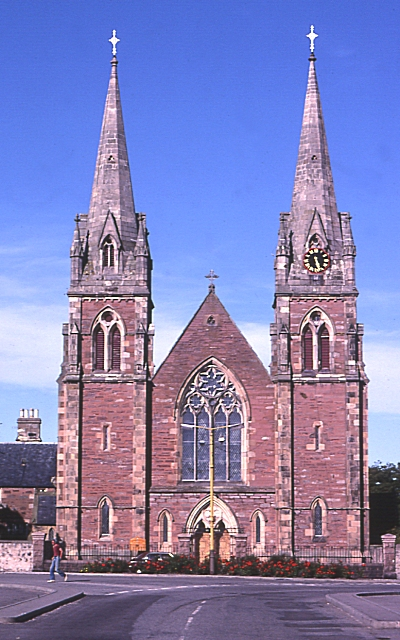
St Peter's Roman Catholic Church

The largest Church of Scotland congregation in the town worships in the North Church in Cluny Square. This building houses the town clock and was opened in 1879. There are other Church of Scotland congregations in addition to Methodist, Salvation Army, Episcopal, Baptist, Gospel Hall Brethren, Church of Christ and other congregational churches.

== Schools ==
Buckie High School is located on West Cathcart Street. Examination results are in line with those of young people with similar needs and backgrounds in other schools across Scotland.

There are four primary schools in Buckie - Cluny Primary School (Buckie Primary School until 1974) which is directly opposite the old building of the high school, Millbank Primary School on McWilliam Crescent off High Street, St. Peter's RC Primary School in Buckpool and Portessie Primary School. Additional primary schools in Portgordon, Findochty, Portknockie and Cullen contribute to the roll of Buckie High School. The surrounding villages of Arradoul, Drybridge, Rathven and Lintmill, most of which once had their own schools, now send students to Buckie High School and nearby primary schools. The adjoining school areas are Banff, Keith and Fochabers.

== Leisure ==
Buckie has two golf courses, at the eastern and western peripheries. To the east lies Strathlene Golf Course, which almost reaches Findochty; while Buckpool Golf Club, lies to the west, and reaches towards Portgordon.

Next to Buckie High School is Victoria Park, home of Buckie Thistle Football Club. Although The Jags were consistently high finishers in the Highland Football League, the league title had eluded the club for over fifty years until winning it in 2010. The championship was retained in 2011, 2017 and 2024. The 1950s was the period of greatest success. During this era Buckie Thistle travelled to Hampden Park to meet Queen's Park in a Scottish Cup 4th round replay on 30 October 1954, winning 2–1, becoming the first and, to this day, only senior non-league club to have won a competitive match at the national stadium. The board has developed the stadium in recent years, adding a function hall offering licensed and catering facilities. In January 2024, the Jags were drawn against Celtic F.C. in the Scottish Cup. The senior team had reputedly donated strips to the club at its foundation, explaining their identical green-and-white hooped strips.

In Buckpool, next door to Buckpool Golf Club, is Merson Park, home of Buckie Rovers Football Club. The Rovers are members of the Scottish Junior Football Association and play in that body's North First Division (East). At one time they played at Victoria Park, alternating home fixtures with their senior cousins but when Buckie Thistle were suffering an episode of financial distress, Rovers decided to move to a new facility at the municipal Merson Park. The Merson Park ground has only a perimeter fence and dugouts differentiating it from a municipal pitch and there are no covered or seated facilities.

At the southern edge of town on High Street is Linzee Gordon Park. This is home to Buckie Cricket Club, which has a very long history with numerous Macallan North of Scotland Cricket Association League titles, as well as various league and cup wins in the 1990s including two wins in the Scottish Cricket Union Small Clubs Cup. The club built a modern pavilion, opened in June 1998, to replace their aging home. The construction was partly funded by Sportscotland and the National Lottery. Linzee Gordon Park also has a municipal pavilion, along with a pitch for football use.

Buckie has two bowling greens. Buckie Bowling Club is on North High Street and Low Street with views over the Moray Firth from the clubhouse. Buckie Victoria Bowling Club is at the end of West Church Street, near the Buckpool bridge. The town also has a 25m swimming pool next to Buckie High School, which opened in 1975.

Buckie is at the end of the Speyside Way long-distance footpath. There are "marvellous landscapes" all along the Banff coast, with easy access to areas such as Glenlivet, Speyside and the Cairngorms.

== Notable people ==
- George Henry Bennett (1850–1908), brewer and politician, of Richmond, Victoria, Australia
- Alexander Hutchison (1943–2015), poet
- Colin Mark (1936–2020), lexicographer and writer in Scottish Gaelic
- George McIntosh (1897–1968), Victoria Cross recipient
- Billy Milne (1895–1975), soldier and football player
- Trond Mohn (born 1943), Norwegian businessman and philanthropist
- Malcolm Slater (born 1938), football player
- Jennifer Smith (sociolinguist), sociolinguist studies Scottish dialect
- Isla St Clair (born 1952), singer
- Alex Wilson (1933–2010), football player

== In popular culture ==
Stephen King mentioned Buckie Thistle in his novella collection If It Bleeds. The author later posed wearing a Buckie Thistle football strip and scarf gifted by the football club.
