= Arradoul =

Coordinates: 57.658°N 2.981°W

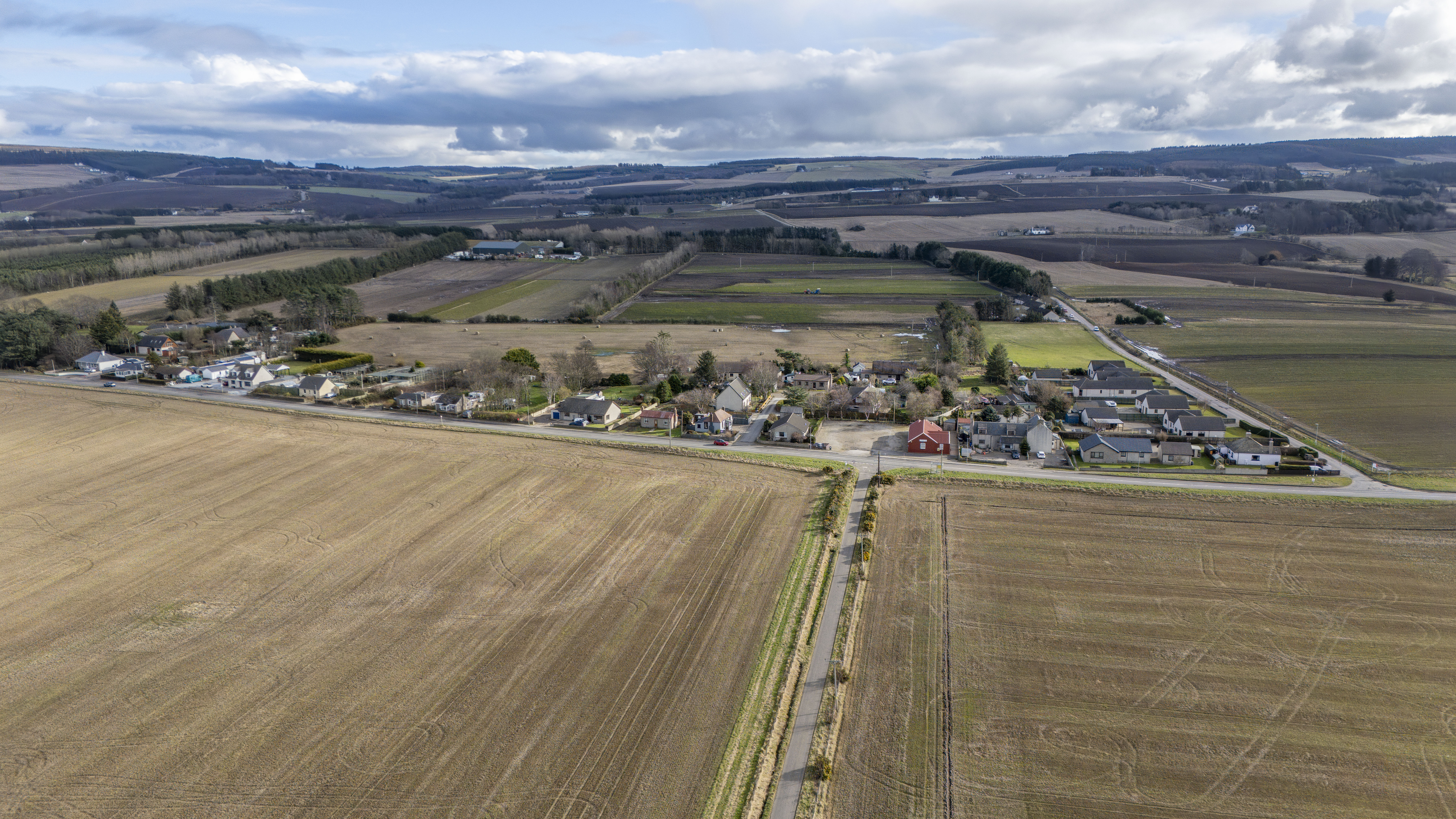
- Drone photo of the hamlet of Arradoul.

- Location within Moray
- OS grid reference: NJ4163
- Council area: Moray
- Lieutenancy area: Banffshire
- Country: Scotland
- Sovereign state: United Kingdom
- Police: Scotland
- Fire: Scottish
- Ambulance: Scottish
- UK Parliament: Moray
- Scottish Parliament: Banffshire and Buchan Coast

Arradoul is a small village in Scotland, in the traditional county of Banffshire, and in the Moray council area. It is a ribbon settlement on the south side of main A98 road between Cullen and Fochabers, near to the Buckpool turn off to the town of Buckie. To the south of the village are the farms of Arradoul Mains, Walkerdales and Cairnfield. Arradoul Mains is owned by Christies of Fochabers and grows sapling trees for the forestry industry across the UK. The Cairnfield Estate is an arable farm growing oats and barley.
