= Buckpool Golf Club =

Golf club located in Scotland

Coordinates: 57.669°N 2.987°W

Buckpool Golf Club is located in Buckie, Moray on the Moray Firth coast of Scotland. This 18 hole course is set out on a clifftop location at the extreme western end of Buckpool. UK Golf Guide describes it as a links course with superlative view over Moray Firth

The course was created in the 1930s and part of the purpose of the project was to create jobs in a time of high unemployment, especially in the herring fishing industry. Golf website St Andrews.com describes Buckpool thus whilst reflecting on its origins as a job creation scheme, for a course of this quality some of today's multi-millionaire course designers would be shaking in their soft-spikes if such schemes were resurrected. In the early sixties the Town Council, which had maintained both Buckpool and Buckie's other course Strathlene decided to close Buckpool due to economic reasons. A group of enthusiasts formed a private club and leased the course which has come a long way from the old farmhouse which was the clubhouse to the present building situated besides the 10th and 18th greens. In 1999 the land was purchased from Moray Council by the members.

Buckpool provides a full calendar of tournaments throughout the season for both Ladies and Gents sections and regular competition for Seniors and Juniors as well.

Today the course plays to a par of 70 and is 6127 yards in length.

Buckpool Golf Club is notable as being the venue for Paul Lawrie's maiden professional tournament victory when he won the 1986 Moray Seafoods Open which was, incidentally, his first ever tournament as a pro.
