= Alex Wilson (footballer, born 1933) =

Scottish footballer

Personal information
- Full name: Alexander Wilson
- Date of birth: 29 October 1933
- Place of birth: Buckie, Scotland
- Date of death: 29 July 2010 (aged 76)
- Place of death: Forres, Scotland
- Position: Full back

Senior career*
Years	Team	Apps	(Gls)
- Buckie Rovers
1949–1967	Portsmouth	350	(4)
- Chelmsford City
- Waterlooville
Total		350	(4)

International career
1954	Scotland	1	(0)
- * Club domestic league appearances and goals

Alexander Wilson (29 October 1933 – 29 July 2010) was a Scottish footballer who played as a defender (left or right full-back), mainly for Portsmouth.

== Career ==
Having signed for his local junior club Buckie Rovers (based in Banffshire, north-eastern Scotland), Wilson joined Portsmouth on leaving school in 1949 – the local Highland Football League club Buckie Thistle, just missed out on signing him. He turned professional with Portsmouth the following year, and played there for 18 years, winning a Division Three championship in 1961–62. In 1967, he moved to Chelmsford City for a short spell and also played for Waterlooville before retiring.

He won his only cap for Scotland in their last preparation match for the 1954 FIFA World Cup Finals against Finland, this coming after just 25 league matches. Although named in Scotland's 22 man squad for Switzerland, Scotland decided to take only 13 of the 22 to the finals. Wilson stayed at home on reserve with the likes of Bobby Combe and Jimmy Binning. Inside forward George Hamilton was also on reserve but traveled after Bobby Johnstone withdrew through injury.
