= Buckpool railway station =

Disused railway station in Scotland

Buckpool
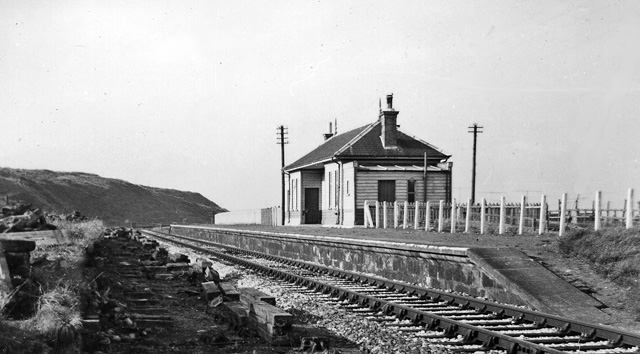
- Buckpool railway station in 1961

General information
- Location: Buckpool, Moray; Scotland
- Coordinates: 57.6729°N 2.9863°W
- Grid reference: NJ 4125 6520
- Platforms: 1

Other information
- Status: Disused

History
- Pre-grouping: Great North of Scotland Railway
- Post-grouping: London and North Eastern Railway

Key dates
- 1 May 1886: station opened as Nether Buckie
- 1 January 1887: renamed Buckpool
- 7 March 1960: Closed
Location

Buckpool railway station was a railway station in Buckpool near Buckie in Moray. The railway station was opened by the Great North of Scotland Railway (GNoSR) on its Moray Firth coast line in 1886, served by Aberdeen to Elgin trains. The village and station were originally named Nether Buckie station and the station was renamed 'Buckpool' on 1 January 1887, closing to regular passenger traffic on 7 March 1960, several years before the closure of the line itself in 1968.

In 1923 the GNoSR became part of the London and North Eastern Railway and at nationalisation in 1948 became part of British Railways. The line was recommended for closure by Dr Beeching's report "The Reshaping of British Railways" and closed on 6 May 1968.

== History ==
=== Background ===
In 1881 the Great North of Scotland Railway put a bill to parliament to extend its Portsoy line along the Moray Firth as far as Buckie. In 1882 the Great North of Scotland applied for permission to build a 25 1/4-mile (40.6 km) line from Portsoy following the coast to Buckie and then running on to Elgin.

=== Great North of Scotland Railway ===
The GNoSR station opened as Nether Buckie on 1 May 1886 with the central section of the coast line, served by through Aberdeen to Elgin trains. In 1923 the Great North of Scotland Railway was absorbed by the London and North Eastern Railway. This was nationalised in 1948, and services provided by British Railways. The line was recommended for closure by Dr Beeching in his report "The Reshaping of British Railways" and closed on 6 May 1968.

== Services ==
The GNoSR station was served by through trains running between Aberdeen and Elgin. There were no Sunday services.

== The station infrastructure ==
Buckpool station had a single platform with a wooden station building and the name 'Buckpool' displayed on the glass window above the platform doors. A cattle loading dock stood facing the passenger platform. The 1902 OS map shows a small goods shed and a couple of sidings with a slaughter house nearby. By 1928 and on to 1938 the slaughter house had enlarged, explaining the cattle dock and a signal box is shown on the Portgordon side of the station building.

The line was predominantly single track apart from a double track section between Buckie and Portessie. Track lifting took place shortly after closure in 1968. The station footbridge servicing the footpath to the beach survived until at least 2012, the retaining wall survives and the bridge abutments, however the platform does not survive.

== Operation Sea Lion and the German spies ==
In September 1940 a German spy named Robert Petter, whose real name was Werner Walti, had been landed by seaplane and after coming ashore in a dinghy had walked to Buckpool railway station, just missing his train connection to Buckie. One of the staff suggested that he might try catching a bus to Buckie station where he could catch a connecting train. The bus conductress remembered Petter as he had oddly given her a 10 shilling note when the fare was only a penny. He had a two-hour wait at Buckie for an Edinburgh bound train and upon arriving there was soon arrested. His two colleagues had already been arrested at Portgordon station after similar suspicious behaviour. The trio had intended to spy on the military facilities in the area, especially the airfields, in preparation for the German invasion of the United Kingdom, code named 'Operation Sea Lion'.

== The Speyside Way ==
This is one of four Long Distance Routes to be found in Scotland, starting in Aviemore and ending at Buckpool's old harbour, making a trail some 65 miles long. The Speyside Way uses sections of the old railway, including the Spey Viaduct near Garmouth.

Preceding station	Historical railways	Following station
Portgordon	Great North of Scotland	Buckie
