= Alexander Hutchison (poet) =

Scottish-Canadian poet

Alexander Norman Hutchison (20 October 1943 – 22 November 2015) was a Scottish poet with Canadian citizenship whose professional career included spells in Canada, the USA, and Scotland.

== Life and career ==
Alexander Hutchison (known as "Sandy") was born in Buckie in the North East of Scotland, the son of Margaret and Gordon Hutchison. In 1966, after graduating from the University of Aberdeen with a joint MA Honours degree in English Literature and Psychology, he took up a teaching post at the University of Victoria in Canada. In 1967 he lived for a while in the Haight-Ashbury district of San Francisco, a city he returned to in the 1970s and early 1980s. In the early 70s he took leave of absence from the University of Victoria to study for a PhD at Northwestern University in Chicago which he was awarded in 1975, thesis title: The Context of Illumination in the Poetry of Theodore Roethke. In March 1975 he became a Canadian citizen. From 1976 to 1984 he also taught courses in senior English for several Vancouver Island colleges and was appointed as a Tutor at North Island College in Campbell River, B.C. He was often published alongside Canadian poets such as Susan Musgrave and Jak English.

He deposited a significant amount of archive material with the University of Victoria library, including early drafts, manuscript proofs, and correspondence. During his time in North America he taught the American poet August Kleinzahler, and the two remained close friends. He married Nora Stacey Seaborne in December 1971.

His first full collection, Deep-Tap Tree, was published by the University of Massachusetts Press in 1978. Richard Ellmann wrote of it: 'Mr Hutchison is his own man, individual in temperament, pungent and accurate in expression. His work is compounded of wit and mystery, and delights his readers even as it teases them into self-recognition.' Robert Creeley commented: 'Sandy Hutchison's poems read brightly, with a fine economy and precision. There is humor and warmth, an ear for clear edges of sound, and a pace that can hold all together.'

Following the break-up of his marriage, Hutchison returned to Scotland in 1984. Settling first in Edinburgh, he met and married Meg Stiven with whom he had two children. In 1989 he set up the Galliard publishing imprint with the Scottish poet and editor Duncan Glen, a project that remained active until 1992. He went on to publish two pamphlets with Duncan Glen’s Akros Publications. In 1991 Hutchison and the family moved to Glasgow, where he worked in Education and Staff Development at the University of Paisley until his retirement in 2010.

In 2006 he began publishing his own poetry under the Link-Light imprint, before being taken up by Salt. This marked a new phase of his writing career, with his selected poems, Scales Dog (2007), putting older poems back into circulation and reaching a new audience. August Kleinzahler contributed the following to the book jacket: '[Hutchison] has the ferocity, indignation and bite of the old flytings, even the mad word-hoard of the Admirable Urquhart of Cromarty; a Scots Martial, but with the unabashed tenderness and exactitude of John Clare describing water lilies or Gerhard in his Herbal, on the subject of the Wild Chervil. A mentor, a bristling master, and a total original.'

His final years were particularly productive and successful. In 2010 the Italian literary magazine In Forma Di Parole dedicated an issue to his work. It featured translations of his poems plus Hutchison’s versions of the works of Latin poet Catullus and leading Italian intellectual Pier Paolo Pasolini in English and Scots. In November 2014 his collection Bones & Breath was awarded the Saltire Award for Scottish Poetry Book of the Year. In March 2015 he was an invited reader at the Festival Internacional de Poesia de Granada, Nicaragua.

In August 2015 he was diagnosed with pancreatic cancer. Just days before he died, Gavia Stellata, a book of his poems translated into Spanish by Juana Adcock, was issued by Mexican publisher Mantis Editores.

== Bibliography ==
- Gallimaufry [10-poem pamphlet] (self-published, 1964)
- Mr Scales at the Auction (Victoria, B.C.: Soft Press, 1972)
- Link-Light [4-poem pamphlet] (Victoria, B.C.: Morriss Printing Co, 1974)
- Four Poems in Broadsheet (Cambridge: Rampant Lions Press, 1977)
- Deep-Tap Tree (Amherst, MA: University of Massachusetts Press, 1978) ISBN 9780870232558
- Flyting [single-poem broadside, limited ed. of 75] (Mission, B.C.: Barbarian Press, 1980)
- The Moon Calf (Edinburgh: Galliard, 1990) ISBN 1-872859-01-1
- Haggis: Surprise, Surprise [single-poem pamphlet] (Edinburgh: Galliard, 1990) ISBN 1-87285-904-6
- Carbuncle's Culinary: An Ounce of Wit to a Pound of Clergy [single-poem pamphlet] (Edinburgh: Minimal Missives, 1991)
- Epitaph for a Butcher (Kirkcaldy: Akros, 1997) ISBN 0-86142-073-X
- Sparks in the Dark (Kirkcaldy: Akros, 2002) ISBN 0-86142-132-9
- Carbon Atom (Glasgow: Link-Light, 2006) ISBN 978-0-95544-340-4
- Scales Dog [selected poems, 1978-2006] (Cambridge: Salt, 2007) ISBN 978-1-84471-330-1 (hbk) ISBN 978-1-84471-541-1 (pbk)
- Epistle from Pevkos [single-poem pamphlet] (Glasgow: Link-Light, 2009)
- Tardigrade [single-poem pamphlet] (Edinburgh: Perjink Press, 2013)
- Bones & Breath (Cromer: Salt, 2013) ISBN 978-1-90777-361-7
- Gavia Stellata [selected poems, English/Spanish edition] (Guadalajara: Mantis Editores, 2015) ISBN 978-6-07939-722-7
- The Fusslin Thrang: Collected Poems in Scots edited by A.B. Jackson (Edinburgh: Blue Diode Press, 2024) ISBN 978-1-91510-820-3

== Prose ==
- Don't Start Me Talking: Interviews with Contemporary Poets, ed. Tim Allen and Andrew Duncan [includes interview with Hutchison] (Cambridge: Salt, 2007) ISBN 978-1-84471-079-9
