= Ianstown =

Coordinates: 57.683°N 2.949°W

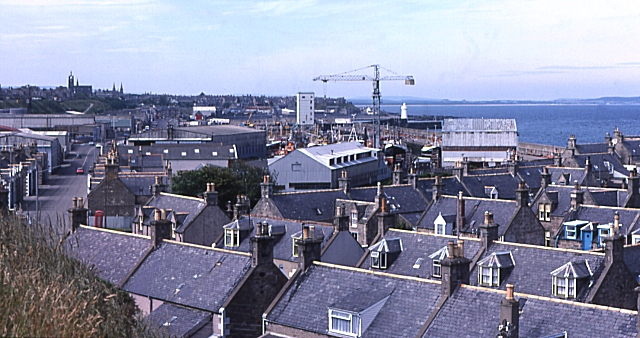

Ianstown (Scottish Gaelic: Baile Iain) is a small village on the Moray Firth in Scotland. It lies within the council area of Moray. Its OS grid reference is NJ435663.

The town of Buckie lies to the west of Ianstown.
