= Isla St Clair =

- Born: Isabella Margaret Dyce; 2 May 1952 (age 74); Grangemouth, Scotland
- Occupation: Singer
- Years active: 1955–present

Isla St Clair (born 2 May 1952 as Isabella Margaret Dyce) is a Scottish singer and television personality. She rose to national prominence in 1978 when she became co-host with Larry Grayson in BBC Television's The Generation Game.

== Life and career ==
Isla St Clair was born in Grangemouth, Central Scotland, on 2 May 1952. Her family came from North East Scotland and it was here that she spent her early years. It was in Findochty that she gave her first stage performances, aged three years, at her mother's Brownie concerts, and with the local Salvation Army.

In 1955 the family moved to Bradfield Green, near Crewe in Cheshire, before moving back to Scotland in 1960. Zetta Sinclair, Isla's mother, was a talented songwriter and poet, and became a founding member of the Aberdeen Folk Club. The young Isla accompanied her mother to the club where both would sing. At the club she came to the attention of a BBC producer. She was twelve years old when she sang on her first television programme, Talk of the North, followed by the radio series Stories are for Singing. She was a regular guest on many other television and radio shows including Hoot'nanny, My Kind of Folk, Corriefolk, On Tour, and Heather Mixture.

Isla was a pupil at Aberdeen Academy and from 1967 Buckie High School. She sang at the opening night of the Buckie and District Folk-Song Club, run by her mother Zetta, in 1967. When Zetta remarried in 1968, Isla adopted the original form of her mother's maiden name, St Clair.

In 1969, St Clair moved to Edinburgh to pursue her singing career. During her teenage years she was influenced by her mother's friend Jeannie Robertson, the traditional ballad singer. Another influence was family friend Hamish Henderson of the University of Edinburgh's School of Scottish Studies, who first recorded Isla when she was 12. In 1971, she released her first LP Isla St Clair sings Traditional Scottish Songs and she was voted "Female Folk Singer of the Year" by the New Musical Express.

St Clair was offered programmes as diverse as To Scotland With Love for light entertainment and Let's See for BBC educational television. There followed numerous appearances, both as singer and presenter, on series such as Isla's Island (34 programmes), Welcome to the Ceilidh (2 series), The Great Western Musical Thunderbox, and Thingummyjig. She also managed to fit in concert tours of the British Isles, continental Europe, the United States, and the Soviet Union (2 tours).

In the late 1970s, St Clair went to STV and asked for a job as a continuity announcer; instead, they gave her a co-presenting job with Peggy O'Keefe on a series called Birthday Honours.

St Clair rose to national prominence in 1978 when she became co-host with Larry Grayson in BBC Television's The Generation Game. She won a number of awards including the Pye Colour Television Award for "TV Personality of the Year". During her four years on the Generation Game St Clair made television appearances on Morecambe and Wise, Max Bygraves Show, The Royal Variety Show, Parkinson, Blue Peter, and Blankety Blank, as well as her own series The Farm On The Hill.

In 1980, Record Business reported that St Clair had a signed a recording deal with Ariola Hansa and that her first single would be a cover of Fleetwood Mac's "Songbird".

In 1981, the BBC offered St Clair the chance to do her own series. She decided to make The Song and The Story which involved dressing up in historical costume and explaining the social history behind folk songs. The series was a success and won The Roses Award "Best Television Programme" and in Munich, the coveted "Prix Jeunesse for Best Light Entertainment". That same year, she was also invited to co-present The Travel Show with Des Lynam for BBC2 and the following year she was chosen to co-host Central Television's The Saturday Show with Tommy Boyd. Despite her success as a presenter, St Clair wanted more singing roles, and in 1984 she was offered the part of Maria in The Sound of Music at Worthing, with Edmund Hockridge. Rather than tour with the musical she decided to retire from the business for a while to bring up her young family.

== Recordings ==
During the 1990s St Clair returned to television with guest appearances on BBC Television's Songs of Praise and ITV's Highway. She began by recording Inheritance in 1993, an album of Scottish folk songs. This was followed a year later with a BBC Radio series about folk music called Kindlin' the Fire. In 1995, she devised a series called Tatties and Herrin, commissioned by BBC Radio, which told the story of the fishing and farming communities of Scotland's north east. The songs from the series were released on two albums: The Land and The Sea. In 1996, St Clair recorded Scenes of Scotland, a collection of her mother's songs. The album was a personal tribute to her mother who had recently died.

In 1998, St Clair appeared in and co-produced When the Pipers Play, a documentary film about the great Highland bagpipe. The film was first aired on PBS television in the United States and went on to win four film festival awards. The accompanying CD was also released the same year. Two years later they co-produced, and she presented, the documentary Millennium Pipes about Marie Curie Cancer Care. The same year she was asked to sing her mother's song "Dunkirk – Lest We Forget" at the Festival of Remembrance, in the Royal Albert Hall. The song was released on the album Amazing Grace – anthems to inspire.

In 2002, St Clair was awarded an honorary degree as Master of the University of Aberdeen for her lifelong contribution to the traditional music of Scotland. During the year she released two more albums: the critically acclaimed The Lady and The Piper, with Gordon Walker; and My Generation, a collection of children's songs. Other albums followed including Looking Forward To The Past, a collection of timeless love songs; "Across the Waters", recorded in Los Angeles with musical support from Eric Rigler; and Great Songs and Ballads of Scotland.

St Clair was invited to sing the lament "Flowers of the Forest" at Tyne Cot Cemetery in Belgium, in 2007, to commemorate the 90th anniversary of the Battle of Passchendaele, in the First World War. The same year she released Highland Laddie, a CD and DVD tribute to Scotland's soldiers. The DVD featured her award-winning music video The Scottish Soldier, filmed at Edinburgh Castle. This was followed by Remember, another tribute album to all servicemen and women. In 2011, St Clair was asked to record Flowers of Forest again, this time for the Scots Guards album From Helmand to Horse Guards.

Isla St Clair continued to work on radio and stage. In 2011–2013 she performed Eyes Front! with Isla St Clair an audio visual production about songs and film in wartime. In 2018 she appeared at Deal Folk Club.

== Publications ==
- 1981: St Clair, Isla & Turnbull, David The Song and the Story. London: Pelham Books ISBN 0-7207-1324-2 (to accompany the TV series)

== Discography ==
- Dowie Houms of Yarrow (1965) Scottish School of Studies recording at Pollock Halls, Edinburgh
- Isla St Clair Sings Traditional Scottish Songs Tangent TGS 112 (1972)
- Isla (Christmas Carols) Columbia SKL 5317 (1979)
- 70 Golden Nursery Rhymes (1979) (various artists: Isla St Clair, Martin Carthy, Shirley Collins and Percy Edwards)
- The Song and The Story Clare ISLA 1 (1981)
- Shape Up and Dance (1982)
- Inheritance (1993)
- Scenes Of Scotland (1996)
- Tatties and Herrin' – The Land (1997)
- Tatties and Herrin' – The Sea (1997)
- When The Pipers Play (1998)
- When the Pipers Play DVD (1999)
- Murder and Mayhem (2000)
- Royal Lovers and Scandals (2000)
- Pipers on Parade DVD (2000) (also marketed as Millennium Pipes)
- Amazing Grace – anthems to inspire (2002) (re-mastered 2004)
- My Generation (2002)
- The Lady and The Piper (2002)
- Looking Forward to the Past (2003)
- Scottish Connections DVD (2003)
- Highland Laddie (2007)
- Highland Laddie DVD (2007)
- Across The Waters (2007)
- Great Songs and Ballads of Scotland (2008)
- Another Version (2009)
- Remember (2009)
- Kids' Stuff (2026)

== TV, film, radio and stage appearances ==
A selection of her numerous appearances:

- Jim McLeod Show (Grampian TV) 1973, Singer
- Regular Features (BBC TV Scotland) 1973, Singer/Presenter
- Isla's Island – series (Grampian TV) 1973/74, Singer/Presenter
- Welcome to the Ceilidh – series (Grampian TV) 1974/75, Singer/Presenter
- Let's See – series (BBC Scotland Educational), Singing/Presenting
- The Great Western Musical Thunderbox (HTV) 1975, Singer
- Scotland on Parade – 3 month Tour of USA 1975, Singing
- The Irish Rovers Show (CBS/Granada) 1975, Singer
- Thingummy Jig (Scottish TV) 1975, Singer
- Two Tours of USSR 1976/77, Singing
- Birthday Honours (Scottish TV) 1978, Presenter
- The Generation Game (BBC TV) 1978–82, Co-Host/Singer
- Speak For Yourself (BBC1 Educational), Acting/Presenting
- Children's Video (Longmans) 1979, Singer
- Farm on the Hill (BBC1 children) 1978/80, Presenter
- Max Bygraves Show (Thames) 1979, Acting/Singing
- Morecambe & Wise Show (Thames) 1980, Acting/Singing
- Royal Variety Show (BBC1) 1982
- The Song and The Story – own series (BBC1) (2 awards) 1981, Acting/Singing (see also album & book to accompany the series)
- The Saturday Show (Central TV) 1982/84, Presenting/Singing
- Sound Of Music – Stage Musical, 1984, Leading Lady
- Highway (HTV) various dates, Singer
- Songs of Praise (BBC1) various dates, Presenter
- Various Christmas shows and Pantomimes, 1975/2008, Acting/Singing

Documentaries

- When the Pipers Play, (4 awards) 1999, Singer/Producer/Producer
- Marie Curie, 2000, Presenter/Producer
- Scots Box, 2000, Presenter/Producer
- Highland Laddie, (Platinum Award) 2007, Singer/Presenter/Producer

Films

- Red Rose, 2005, Actress
