= Buckie High School =

Coordinates: 57°40′23″N 02°58′10″W

Location
- West Cathcart Street; Buckie, Banffshire, AB56 1QB; Scotland

Information
- Type: Comprehensive state school
- Motto: Remis Velisque ("By, or with, oars and sails")
- Established: 1874
- Local authority: The Moray Council
- Rector: Jemma Playfair
- Gender: Co-educational
- Age: 11 to 18
- Enrolment: 903 pupils (2008)
- Houses: Cluny, Lennox, Rathburn, Seafield
- Website: https://buckiecommunityhighschool.co.uk/

Buckie High School is a mixed secondary school in Buckie, Moray, Scotland which has a roll of around 900 pupils in years S1 to S6. The school serves the coastal communities of Portgordon, Buckie, Portessie, Findochty, Portknockie and Cullen.

== History ==
=== Rathven School Board ===
There has been a secondary school in Buckie since 1875. The opening followed the 1872 Education (Scotland) Act, which made education compulsory between the ages of 5 and 13 and put education in the charge of 895 school boards. Rathven School Board covered the Buckie area and built Buckie Public School in West Church Street, at its junction with Pringle Street. The first entry in the school's log book on 14 January 1876 records that there were 100 pupils enrolled in the charge of a rector, and two pupil teachers. The curriculum consisted of reading, writing, arithmetic, grammar and composition, history, geography, singing and religious knowledge, with Latin for some pupils. The Latin in the school motto translates as 'with oars and sails' - and suggests doing things with all the effort and power one can muster.

School Board records show that by 1881 mathematics and domestic economy had been added to the curriculum and the roll had risen to 400, with a rector, two assistant teachers and six pupil teachers. In 1896, the school had nineteen staff and 850 pupils. The curriculum had been widened and now included Greek, French, cookery, industrial work, drawing, military drill, German, science and shorthand.

The first mention of national examinations was in 1894 when the school log in June noted that "the Leaving Certificate Examinations interfered with work", but in 1895 the Inspectors' report noted with commendation, "there were gained 53 Leaving Certificates – 18 at the Higher Grade."

For many years after 1876, school attendance followed a seasonal pattern depending on the herring fishing. At this time many families travelled with the fishing fleet as they followed the herring around the coast of Britain. In September 1880, for example, the school opened with 83 in attendance. In the next two weeks attendance rose to 183 and then 255, but by July it had dropped to 65. School log books refer to the herring fishing, lifting potatoes, pupils "jooking" and the problem of pupils "forgetting what they have been taught".

=== Banffshire County Council ===
In 1919, control of the school moved to the newly formed Banffshire County Council. By this time there had been several extensions to the original Buckie Public School building and the pupil roll was well over 1,000. The school log notes the existence of a "Supplementary Course" for pupils who did not wish to pursue academic studies and also that pupils were achieving success in the Aberdeen University Bursary Competition. The Bursary Competition was the yardstick of success at this time. Navigation was introduced to the curriculum as it was becoming important for Board of Trade examinations.

By 1921, the old school building was inadequate and it was decided to build a new secondary school, at a cost of £30,000, on its present site in West Cathcart Street. It was opened in 1927, by which time there was a staff of 36 (including seven principal teachers) and sport and music began to play an important part in the life of the school. This new stone-built building, now known as the Old Building, is still in use today and houses four subject departments. All primary classes, technical education and cookery remained in the original Buckie Public School building in West Church Street.

In 1937, it was decided to build a new building for the primary department for Buckie Public School immediately opposite the secondary department in West Cathcart Street. The building was, however, too small even before it opened, so classes continued to use the original building in West Church Street into the 1960s. The Banffshire Education Committee decided to make the primary department a separate school in 1969. It was known as Buckie Primary School for a decade until it was renamed Cluny Primary School.

After the Second World War, the welfare state provision led to the opening of canteen facilities, provision of free books and travel when required, and to the provision of courses which, in the catchphrase of the day, "were suitable to the age, aptitude and ability of the pupil". Ordinary and Higher Grade exams were introduced after 1962.

The raising of the school leaving age to 16 in 1972-73, and the introduction of comprehensive education, led to an urgent need to expand what was by now known as Buckie High School. Banffshire Education Committee planned to build a new block at Buckie High School and to close the junior secondary schools in Portgordon, Buckpool (St.Peter's), Portessie, Findochty, Portknockie and Cullen.

=== Grampian Regional Council ===
Regionalisation transferred the school to Grampian Region in 1975. Buckie High School's "New Building" was completed in 1974, allowing it to cater for all secondary age pupils in the coastal area between Cullen and Portgordon. It was now a comprehensive school aiming to meet the needs of all pupils in the west of Banffshire. The old building in West Cathcart Street continued to be used to house the Music Department until around 1983 before its sale and conversion into flats known as Pringle Court. The adjacent School Cottage in Pringle Street, which had in past years housed the school caretaker and compulsory officer was sold in the mid 1990s The school became fully inclusive when Clochan Special School was integrated into the High School in 1986. Grampian identified Buckie High School as one of its six "social priority" schools following the downturn in fishing and related industries. The new Standard Grade exams were phased in during the late 1980s and Buckie High became a front runner in developing the curriculum for these new courses. A new reception and community wing was added in 1990 and the school became known locally as Buckie Community High School.

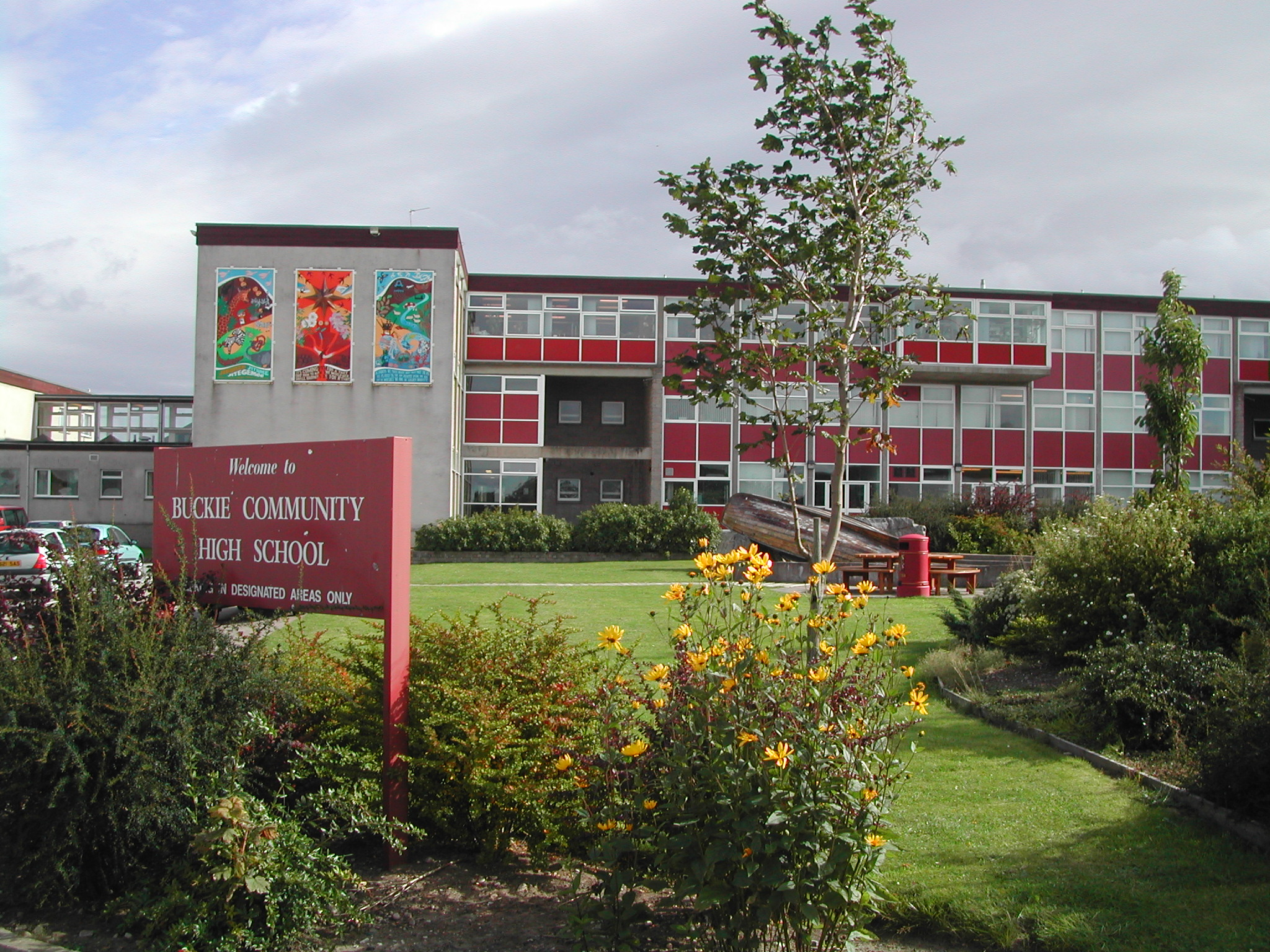
Buckie High School

=== Moray Council ===
Buckie High School was transferred to Moray Council in 1996 and is now one of eight secondary schools in the Moray area. Its associated primary schools are Portgordon Primary School, St Peter's Primary School, Cluny Primary School, Millbank Primary School, Portessie Primary School, Findochty Primary School, Portknockie Primary School and Cullen Primary School.

== Learning and achievement ==
Examination results are broadly in line with those of young people with similar needs and backgrounds in other schools.

HMIe report that in addition to Scottish Qualifications Authority examinations, large numbers of young people are participating in a range of activities which develop skills and confidence. These include a wide range of sports, music and theatrical productions as well as regular residential and overseas visits, college courses, enterprise activities and an annual activities week. Young people's skills are recognised through a range of awards including awards from the Award Scheme Development and Accreditation Network (ASDAN), Duke of Edinburgh's award scheme, Sports Leadership awards, Youth Achievement awards, John Muir Awards and Dynamic Youth Awards.

== Football ==
Buckie is proud of its football teams, especially the senior team. The team won back-to-back League and League Cup titles in the 2011/12 and the 2012/13 seasons. In 2013/14, the team once again reached the League Cup final but was defeated, which cost them the league also. However, the team won the North of Scotland Cup when they beat a Stornaway side 3-1. This was the first time Buckie High had won the trophy since 1960, when they beat Dornoch Academy 5-3 under lights at Telford Street Park in Inverness.

== Curriculum ==
=== Courses ===
School inspectors report that the school provides a very good range of courses and activities to motivate young people and to meet their needs in innovative ways. As well as the full range of school-based Scottish Qualifications Authority courses, vocational courses at Moray College and Banff and Buchan College are widely used to complement the in-school curriculum. In addition, some pupils each year work towards a vocationally orientated Scottish Group Award. In 2006, pupils on this course teamed up with Springfield Properties, an Elgin-based building company, to build their own house in the school grounds. Buckie High School also enriches the curriculum with a wide range of enterprise and citizenship activities including young enterprise companies, fair trade and Africa weeks, and enterprise challenges. As an Ecoschool, Buckie High has been endeavouring to tackle litter and waste, is landscaping the grounds and, with the support of the Co-op, installed solar roof panels in 2008.

To meet young people's learning needs the school provides a distinctive range of courses at different levels for all year groups.

=== Working with partners ===
Buckie High School has an active Parent Council which also includes pupils. The school makes innovative use of an interactive American website to extend learning into the home. The technology allows all teachers to post materials on line, while the password-protected subject message boards allow pupils to access learning materials or provide feedback from home or anywhere in the world.

=== Library ===
Recent visitors include Catherine MacPhail, Terry Deary, Ian Rankin, Alan Bissett, Keith Gray, Catherine Forde, Anne Macleod, Liz Lochhead, Bernard MacLaverty and Liz Niven. Terry Deary's Horrible Histories series entry about Scotland (Bloody Scotland, Hippo Books, 1998) is dedicated to the pupils of Buckie High School, after they challenged him to produce such a book.

== Partnership ==
Buckie High School has been building a partnership with Mawenzi Secondary School in Moshi, Tanzania since 1989. Between 1992 and 2010, there were nineteen reciprocal visits. Pupils and staff have been involved with presentations at the Commonwealth Institute, the Commonwealth Education Ministers' Conference in 2003 and the Scottish Learning Festival in 2007. Both schools recognize the need to embed global issues in the curriculum and are exploring together issues of diversity, values and perceptions, sustainability, and social justice.

== Innovation and improvement ==
The school achieved Investors in People status in 2004, renewed in 2007 and 2010. In 2009, HM Inspectorate noted that the school has "a strong capacity for improvement".

Buckie High School brought automated messaging to the UK in 2000 to notify parents and carers of unexplained absences. A Scottish Executive grant allowed an American system to be adapted for use in United Kingdom. The initial system used recorded voice messages to advise parents whenever their child could not be accounted for. This has been replaced by text messaging and is now widespread across the UK.

Innovative strategies have been used to help older pupils support younger ones in their learning. Based on the notion that the best way to learn something is to teach it, cross-age tutoring has been used to teach pupils specific skills. Fourth year maths classes have, for example, paired up with a second year class for pupils to teach fractions. Fifth and sixth year students have paired up with younger students to learn about HIV. This cross-age tutoring in relation to HIV has also involved teachers and pupils from Buckie High School's partner school in Tanzania.

In 2007-2008, music, drama and art were used to inspire better performance in mathematics. The Scottish Arts Council provided funding to allow artists to work alongside mathematics teachers in classrooms. Finding new ways to help pupils understand key concepts such as volume continues to be central to Scotland's emerging Curriculum for Excellence.

== Buildings ==
The main school building is separated into three sections - the old building, the "new" building and the new performing arts facility, opened in 2010.

The old building has two floors, the ground floor consisting of the English department and some of the modern languages department. Upstairs is mainly mathematics, with two modern languages classrooms.

In the "new" building, there are some recreational areas on the ground floor which include reception, the snack bar, and the social area with vending machines. There is also the medical room, senior leadership team offices and the janitors' office. There are classrooms for P.E. (connected to the swimming pool), business education, art and design and computing/ICT. On the second floor, there is home economics, the library, the prefects' common room, history, modern studies and the staff room. On the top floor is biology, physics, chemistry, practical electronics, geography, RME and the technicians' base.

The new extension consists of two classrooms, two music classrooms, a drama classroom, a suite of sound proof music practice rooms and a state-of-the-art performance space, commonly referred to as the Highfield Hall, with fold away bleacher seating for 240 people. There is also a technical block which consists of woodwork, metalwork and technical drawing rooms.

== Rectors of Buckie High School ==
1876 - 1877: James Buchanan
1877 - 1879: Peter Grant
1879 - 1896: Alex Horn
1896 - 1912: Alex Muir
1913 - 1932: Charles Thomson
1932 - 1948: George Milne
1948 - 1966: William Dickie
1966 - 1987: George McKenzie
1987 - 2007: Chris Sugden
2007 - 2011: David Barnett
2012 - 2024: Neil Johnson
