= Blair Athol distillery =

Whisky distillery in Perthshire, Scotland

Coordinates: 56°41′54.5″N 3°43′15.0″W

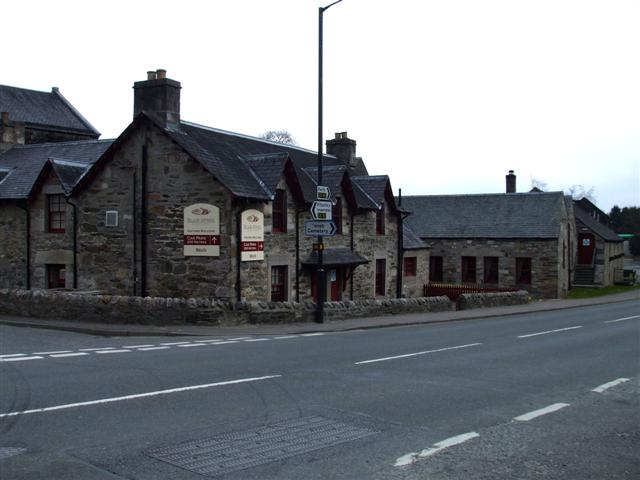
- Location: Pitlochry
- Owner: Diageo
- Founded: 1798
- Status: Operational
- Water source: Allt Dour Burn
- No. of stills: 2 wash stills (13,000 liters); 2 spirit stills (12,000 liters)
- Capacity: 2,500,000 litres
- Mothballed: Soon after 1798 to 1825; 1932 to 1949

Blair Athol 12
- Type: Single malt
- Age(s): 12 Years
- ABV: 43%

Blair Athol distillery is a Highland single malt Scotch whisky distillery located on the south edge of Pitlochry in Perthshire, near the River Tummel in Scotland.

It is used in Bell's whisky, and is also normally available in a 12-year-old bottling.

== History ==
The distillery was founded in 1798 by John Steward and Robert Robertson. Originally named 'Aldour', after the Allt Dour burn the distillery draws it water from, but closed soon after opening. The distillery opened again and changed ownership to John Robertson in 1825.

It was sold several times in the period after, going from John Robertson to Alexander Conacher & Co., then to John Conacher & Co, which was inherited by Elizabeth Conacher in 1860. It was sold again to Peter Fraser & Co, and again to Peter Mackenzie of P. McKenzie & Co Distillers Limited in 1882.

The distillery closed down in 1932. The mothballed distillery was bought by Arthur Bell and Sons, but didn't open again until it was rebuilt in 1949. In 1973 the distillery expanded, adding two further stills to the previous two.

In 1987, Guinness combined the businesses of Arthur Bell & Sons and Distillers Company. In 1997, Guinness merged with Grand Metropolitan to create Diageo, the current owner of Blair Athol distillery.
