= Bell's whisky =

Blended whisky

Bell's
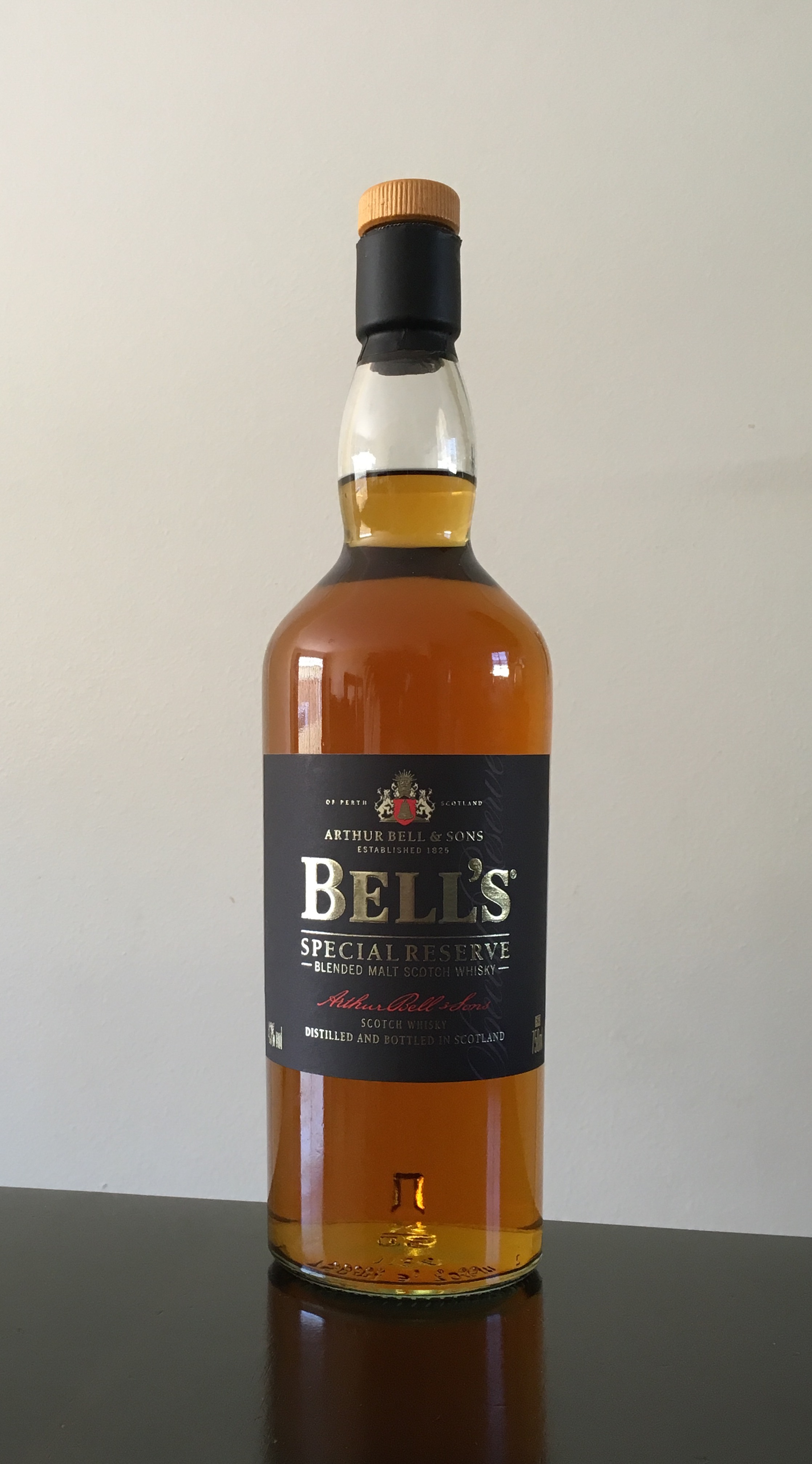
- Type: Scotch Whisky
- Manufacturer: Diageo
- Origin: Scotland
- Introduced: 1851
- Alcohol by volume: 40%
- Website: bells.co.uk

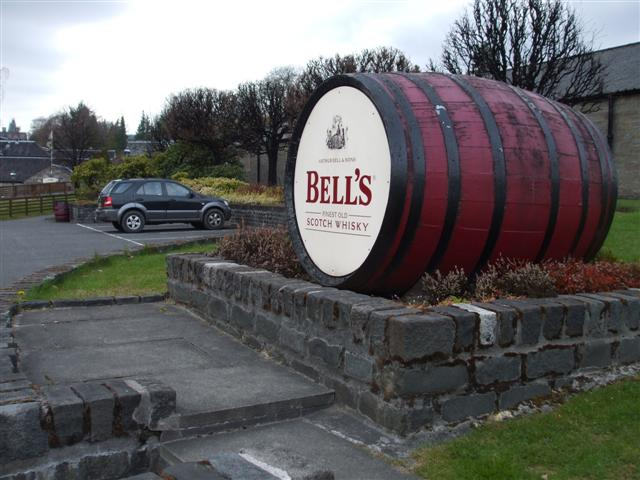
Bell's Scotch Whisky barrel at the Blair Athol distillery in Pitlochry, Perthshire

Bell's is a brand of blended Scotch whisky produced by Diageo in Scotland. It was originally produced by Arthur Bell & Sons Ltd and is one of the best selling whiskies in Great Britain, only slightly behind The Famous Grouse which is the best selling Scotch whisky on the island.

== History ==
The Bell's producer Arthur Bell & Sons Ltd was founded in 1798.

In 1851, Arthur Bell (1825–1900) began to blend various single malts together to create a more consistent blended whisky. Arthur Bell was the first known whisky manufacturer to appoint a London agent, by at least 1863. Bell's two sons joined the business in partnership in 1895. Arthur Kinmond (1868–1942) was appointed to manage the domestic market and Robert was appointed as head of the brand overseas.

By the 1880s, the company was focused on blended whisky. Arthur Bell died in 1900. In 1921, the partnership became a private company run by Arthur Kinmond after Robert retired to live as a country gentleman. The end of Prohibition in America created a surge in demand, which led Arthur Bell & Sons to acquire two distilleries in 1933: Blair Athol and Dufftown. In 1936, the Inchgower distillery was also acquired.

The Bell brothers died in 1942 and the company accountant, William Govan Farquharson, became chairman of the company. He focused on advertising the brand more heavily. Bell's became a public company in 1949. In 1954, Arthur Bell exported to 130 countries.

By 1970, Bell's was the highest selling whisky in Scotland. In the early 1970s, Bell's could not afford the advertising budget of the larger whisky distillers. Instead, it focused on the use of mixers with its product. This increased the product's popularity with women, and Bell's revenues rose by 800% between 1970 and 1979. In 1978, Bell's became the UK's highest selling whisky. Much of the credit for this expansion is given to the then managing director Raymond Miquel.

By 1980, the company had around 35 percent market share in the UK. Arthur Bell & Sons acquired Gleneagles Hotels in 1984.

In 1985, the company was acquired by Guinness for $518 million.

n 1987, Guinness combined the businesses of Arthur Bell & Sons and Distillers Company forming United Distillers.

In 1997, Guinness merged with Grand Metropolitan to create Diageo, the current owner of Arthur Bell & Sons.

== Production ==
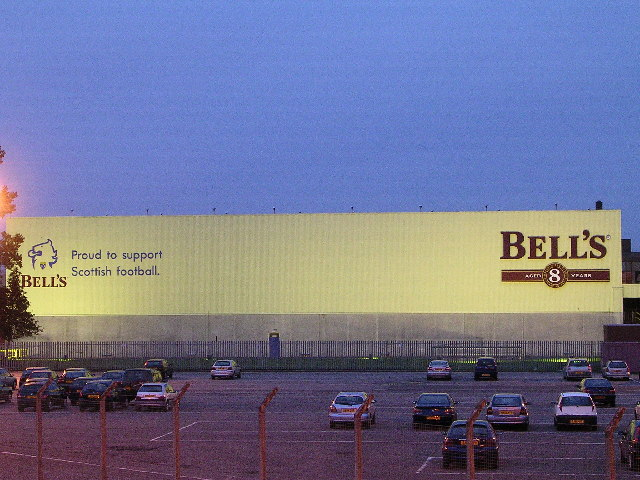
Shieldhall bottling plant, Glasgow

Blair Athol is the main component of the blend. Dufftown and Inchgower still figure, but Glenkinchie and Caol Ila are also components.

The Pittyvaich distillery was used in the blend between 1974 and 1993.

Bell's is bottled at Diageo's Shieldhall, Glasgow plant.

The product is 40% ABV in the UK, and 43% ABV in South Africa.

== Distilleries ==
Arthur Bell & Sons Ltd owned three whisky distilleries in Scotland:

- Blair Athol
- Dufftown
- Inchgower

== Markets ==
The brand's top markets are the UK, Portugal, Spain, the Nordic countries, Brazil and South Africa.

== Advertising ==
A religious man, modesty prevented Arthur Bell from using his name on his whisky. The Arthur Bell name was not attached to the product until 1904.

A yellow floribunda rose was named after Arthur Bell in the early 1960s. Bell's has used the "Afore ye go" slogan since 1925.

Bell's 2016 Christmas TV advert campaign starred actor Matt Berry in character as "Steven Toast".
