= Inchgower distillery =

Whiskey distillery in Moray, Scotland

Coordinates: 57°39′44.61″N 2°57′51.3″W

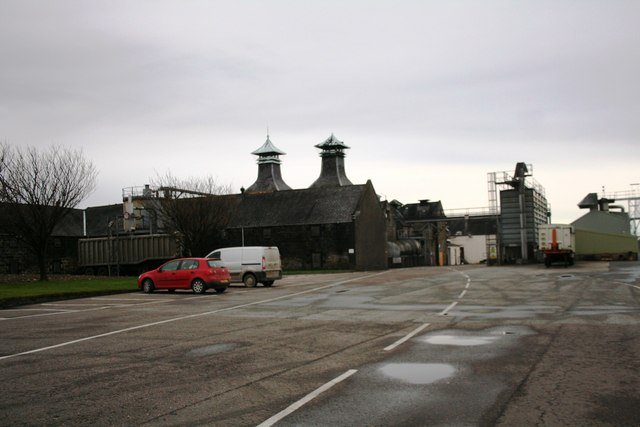

Region: Speyside
- Owner: Diageo
- Founded: 1871
- Status: Active
- Water source: Menduff Hills springs
- No. of stills: 2 wash stills 2 spirit stills
- Capacity: 1,990,000 litres

Inchgower distillery is a whisky distillery producing a single malt of the same name located on the outskirts of Buckie, Moray, Scotland.

== History ==
The distillery was built in 1871 to replace Tochineal Distillery but liquidated in 1903.

Buckie Council purchased the concern in 1936 and ownership was transferred to Arthur Bell & Sons Ltd in 1938 and indeed to this very day the Bell's logo is used in the advertising of Inchgower.

In 1985, Arthur Bell & Sons was taken over by Guinness, who were then merged with United Distillers and Vintners in 1987.

In 1997, Guinness PLC and Grand Metropolitan merged and formed Diageo.

The distillations of Inchgower contribute to Bell's blended whisky.

The Inchgower is classified as a Lower Speyside Malt and takes its water from a burn rising in the Menduff Hills to the south of Buckie.
