= Strathlene Golf Course =

Coordinates: 57.696°N 2.915°W

Strathlene at Findochty, near Buckie, is one of the oldest golf courses in Scotland. It was established in 1877 and is home to Strathlene Buckie Golf Club. The ground was given to the town by Mr Bryson the factor of Seafield Estates at that time. The original 9 holes were created between Portessie and Strathlene House, where 2 of the holes were situated in the area which is now the Caravan Site. The original clubhouse was situated at the entrance to Portessie railway Station. In 1936 the course was extended to 18 holes with the purchase of ground on the headland between Strathlene and the village of Findochty, and was designed by Mr George Smith of Lossiemouth.

Strathlene is an interesting cliff top Links type course. Every hole has its own characteristics, of undulating fairways, gullies and elevated greens, making the most of the natural contours of the land. Four of the original holes make up the finish to the round. Strathlene is a fine test of golf for all levels of golfer, with its views of the Moray Firth, the dolphins and the surrounding countryside. It plays to a par of 69 and is 5977 yards in length.

The clubhouse was relocated on the cliff top overlooking Strathlene, in 1936 and a new one was built in 1974. The club bought the ground from the local council in 1997, and have recently completed the development of a new Golf Training Facility. It consists of practice bunkers, a 3-hole, pitch and putt, putting greens and a 14 bay driving range. This is a community project run by the club for the youth in particular, but is open to all. Strathlene also has full bar and catering facilities.
