= Buckpool =

Village in Moray, Scotland

Coordinates: 57.70311°N 2.89934°W

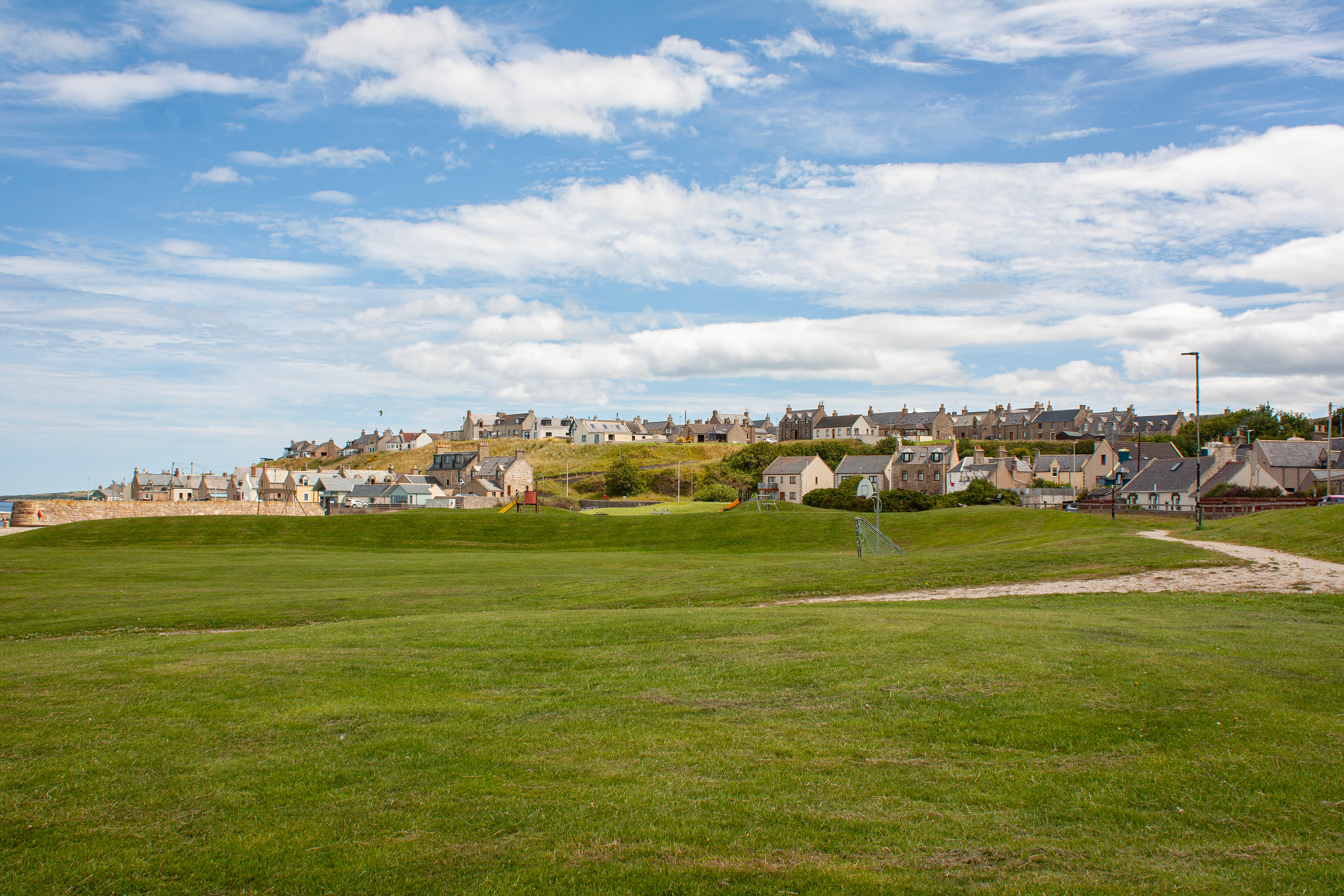
Buckpool

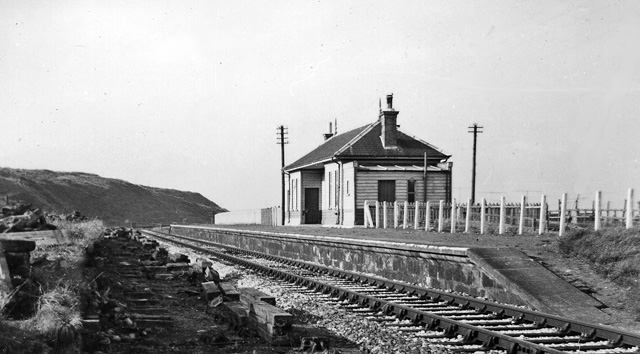
Until 1960, Buckpool was served by Buckpool railway station on the Great North of Scotland line

Buckpool is a village on the coast of Moray, Scotland. Originally known as Nether Buckie, it is now effectively a part of the town of Buckie as the nearby fishing settlements merged as they expanded. Buckpool Harbour was built in 1857 by local laird, Sir Robert Gordon of Cluny. It was unpopular due to silting, hence fishermen moved to the larger Cluny Harbour in Buckie once it was completed by 1877. Buckpool Harbour was filled in with stones from the neighbouring Yardie beach in the 1970s and landscaped into a park. The Harbour now is the start/end of the Speyside Way walking route.

== Buckpool Golf Club ==
Buckpool Golf Club's 18 hole links-style course was created in the 1930s. Part of the purpose of the project was to create jobs in a time of high unemployment, especially in the herring fishing industry.

== See also ==
- Buckpool railway station
