= Findochty =

Village in Moray, Scotland

Coordinates: 57.698°N 2.902°W

Findochty: Scottish Gaelic: Am Fionn Ochdamh; Scots: Finichty
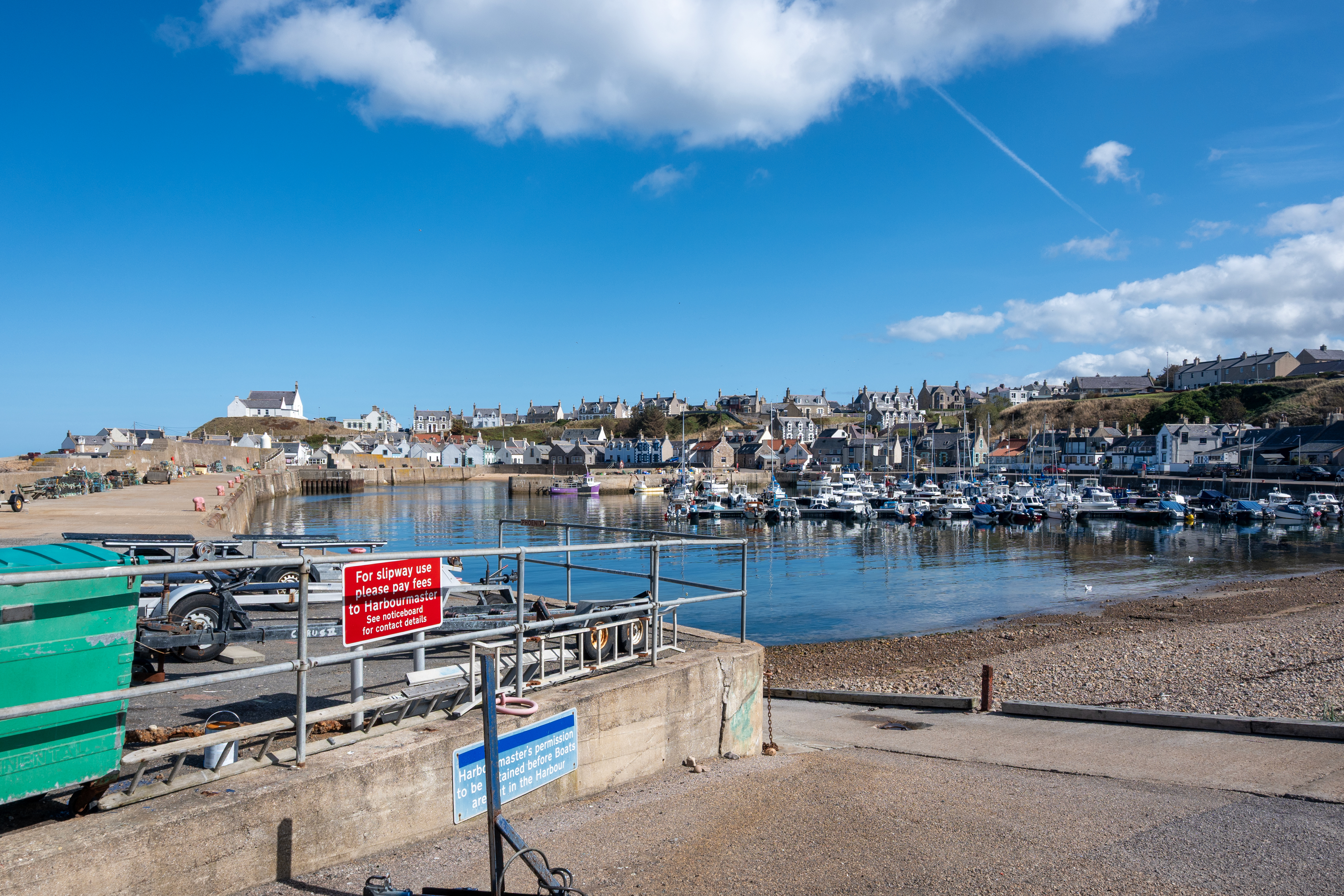
- Findochty Harbour, with village in background

- Location within Moray
- Population: 1,130 (2020)
- OS grid reference: NJ4667
- Civil parish: Rathven
- Council area: Moray
- Lieutenancy area: Banffshire
- Country: Scotland
- Sovereign state: United Kingdom
- Post town: BUCKIE
- Postcode district: AB56
- Dialling code: 01542
- Police: Scotland
- Fire: Scottish
- Ambulance: Scottish
- UK Parliament: Aberdeenshire North and Moray East
- Scottish Parliament: Banffshire and Buchan Coast

Findochty (pronounced /fɪˈnɛxti/, Scots: Finichty, Scottish Gaelic: Am Fionn Ochdamh) is a village in Moray, Scotland, on the shores of the Moray Firth; historically it was part of Banffshire. A comparison of the First and Second Edition Six-inch Ordnance Survey Maps, publishd in 1870 and 1905 respectively shows how the harbour and the village developed during the intervening years.

== Fishing ==
In the Annual Report of the Fishery Board for 1909 we learn that Findochty is "declining as a herring curing station; fishermen prosecute the herring fishing from other places, coming home only at weekends. In 1914 we learn of "an increase of three steam drifters. Majority of fishermen employed exclusively at herring fishing".

Fishery Statistics

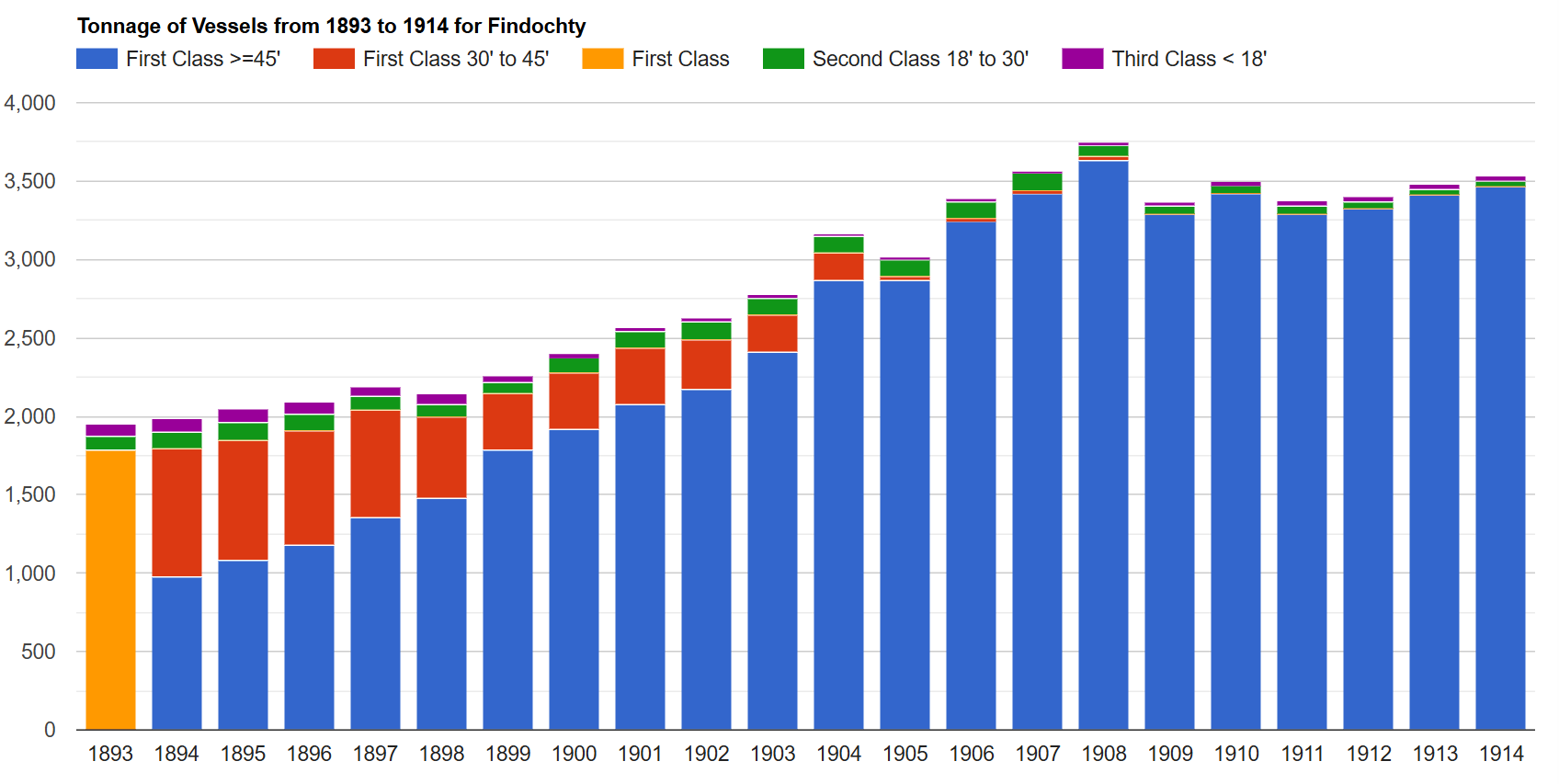
Tonnage of vessels

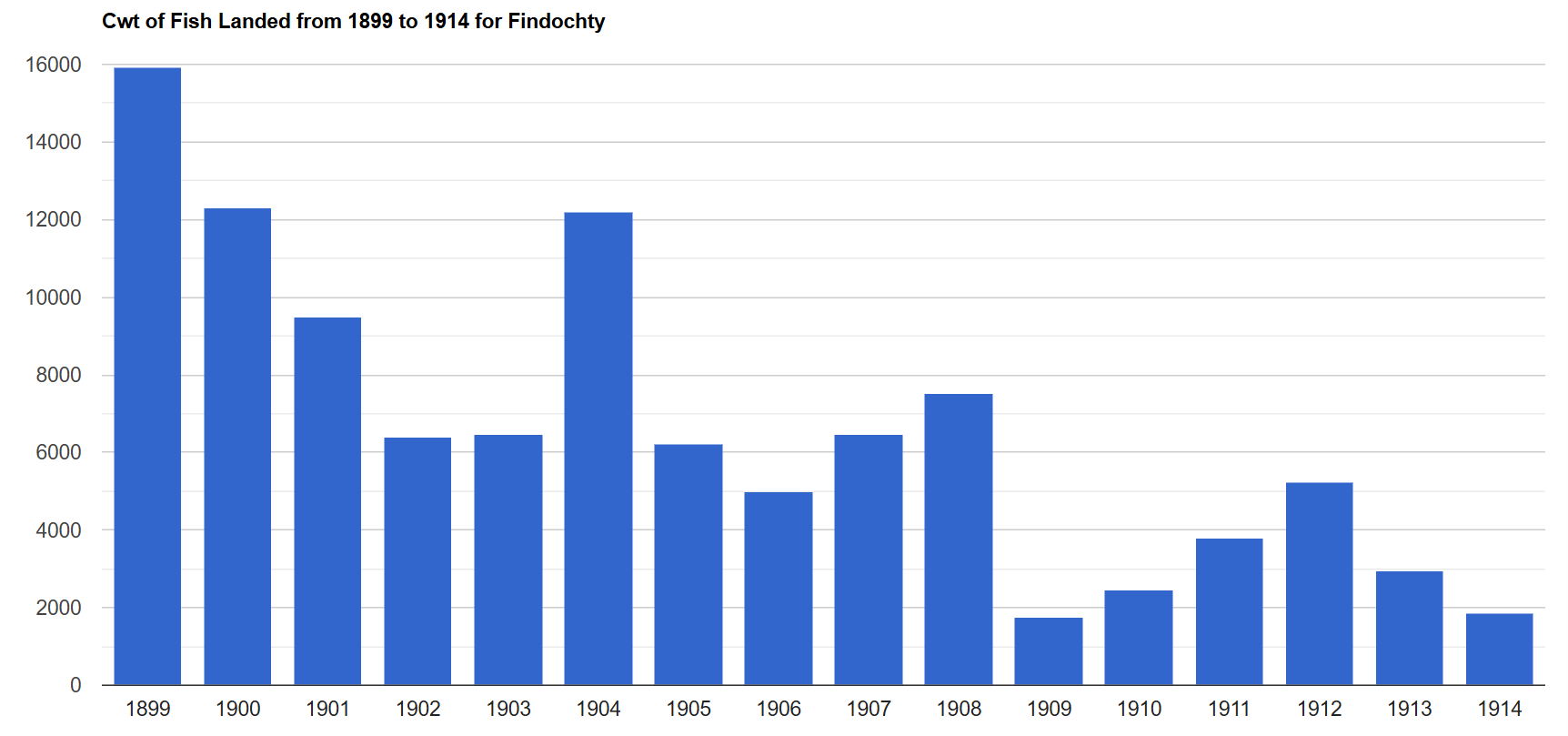
Cwt of fish landed

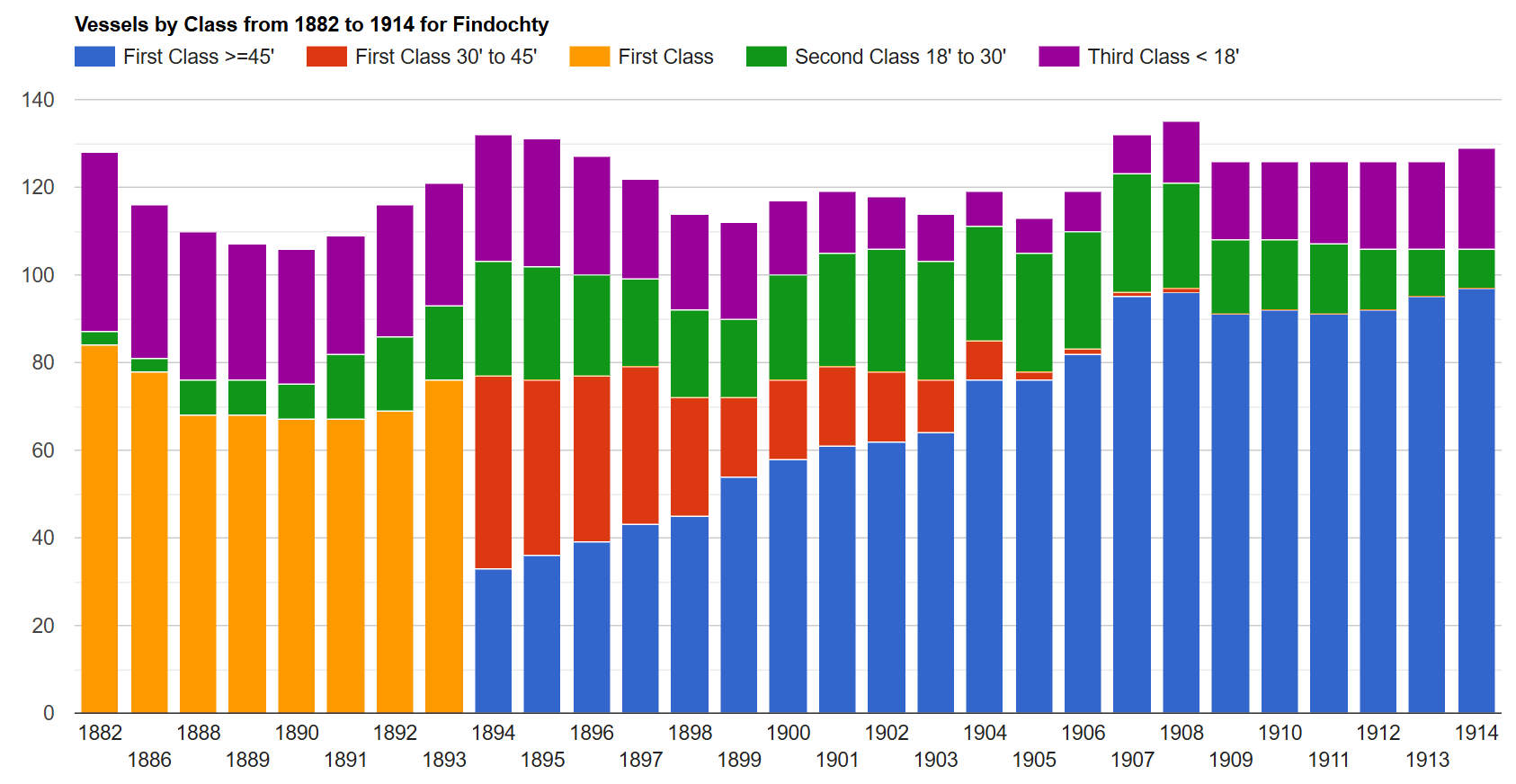
Vessels by class

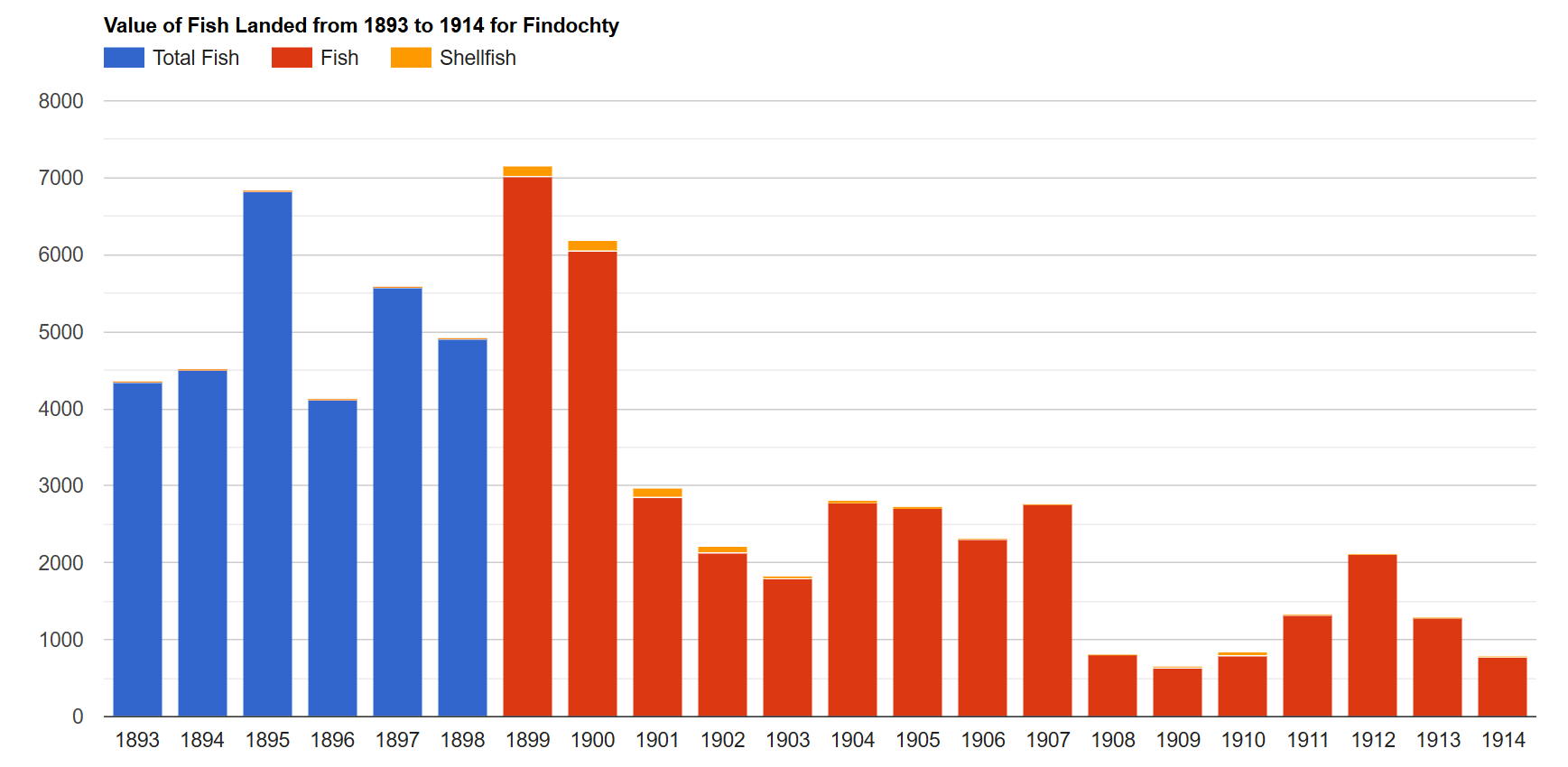
Value (£) of fish landed

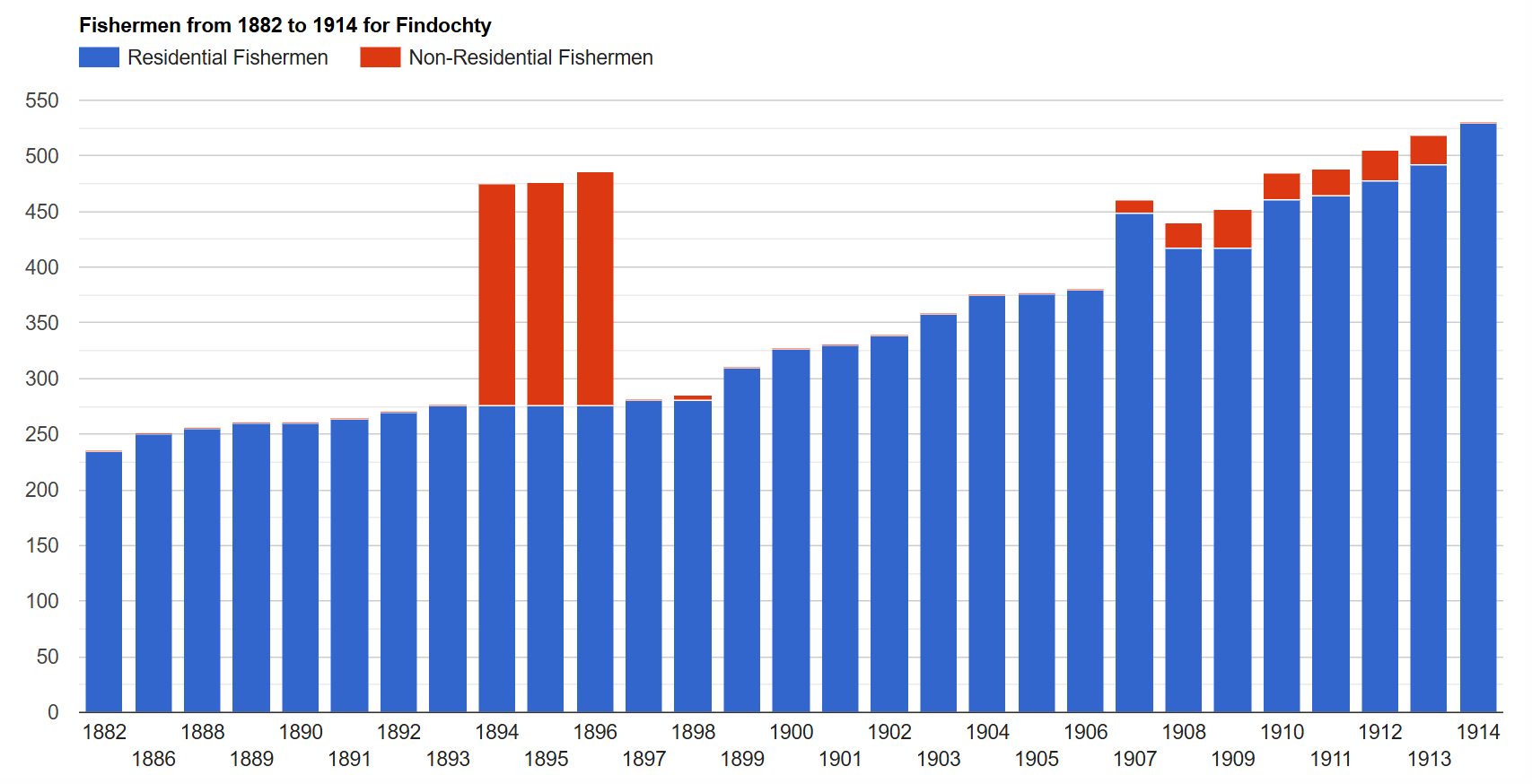
Fishermen

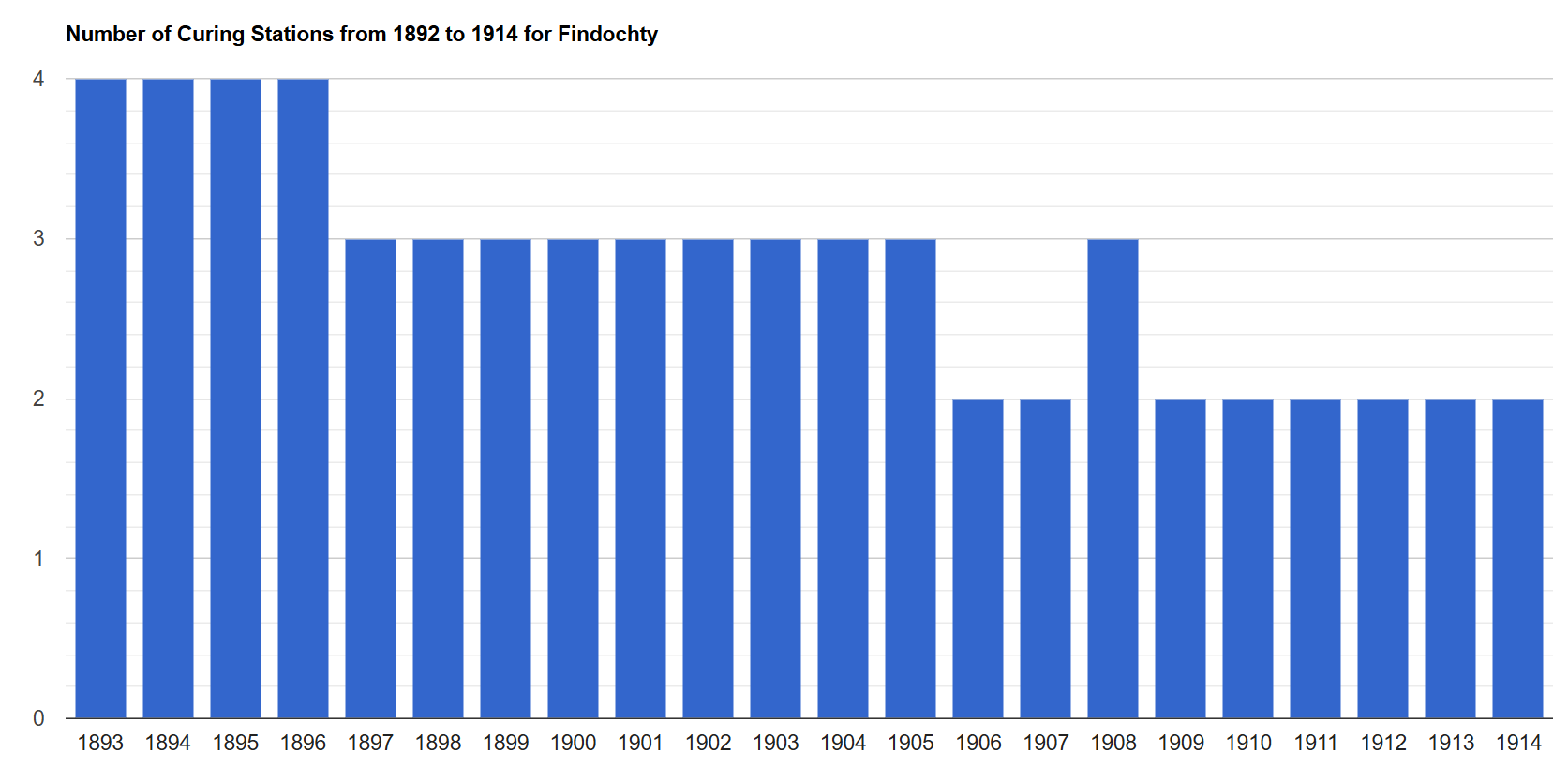
Number of curing stations

== Churches ==
There are a number of churches in this small village, including Church of Scotland, Salvation Army, and Christian Brethren at both Chapel Street, and the Station Road Hall - which has an annual Bible Conference every August drawing Christians from all parts of the British Isles and many overseas countries.

== Notable people ==
- Isla St Clair, singer
