= List of places in Moray =

Map of places in Moray compiled from this list

This List of places in Moray is a list of links for any town, village or hamlet in the Moray council area of Scotland.

== A ==
- Aberlour
- Alves
- Archiestown
- Arradoul
- Auchenhalrig
- Auchindoun,

== B ==
- Ballindalloch,
- Ben Rinnes
- Boharm
- Bogmoor
- Borough Briggs
- Broadley
- Buckie,
- Burghead,

== C ==
- Cairngorms National Park
- Cardhu Distillery
- Clochan
- Cragganmore Distillery
- Craigellachie
- Culbin Sands, Forest and Findhorn Bay
- Cullen
- Cummingston

== D ==
- Dallas,
- Deskford
- Dipple
- Drybridge
- Dufftown,
- Duffus, Duffus Castle
- Dyke

== E ==
- Elgin,

== F ==
- Findhorn
- Findochty
- Fochabers
- Fogwatt
- Forres

== G ==
- Garmouth

== H ==
- Hopeman

== I ==
- Ianstown
- Inchberry
- Inchkeil

== K ==
- Keith
- Kingston
- Kinloss,
- Kintrae
- Kirkmichael

== L ==
- Lhanbryde
- Longmorn
- Lossiemouth

== M ==
- Macallan
- Mill of Tynet
- Miltonduff
- Moray Firth
- Mosstodloch

== N ==
- Nether Dallachy
- Newmill

== P ==
- Pluscarden Abbey
- Portgordon
- Portknockie

== R ==
- Raffan
- Rafford
- River Findhorn
- River Spey
- Roseisle
- Rothes
- Rothiemay

== S ==
- Spey Bay, Speyside, Speyside Cooperage
- Spynie,
- Strathisla,
- Sueno's Stone

== T ==
- Tomintoul

== U ==
- Unthank
- Upper Dallachy
- Urquhart

== See also ==
- List of places in Scotland
