= Benromach distillery =

Scotch distillery

Region: Speyside
- Location: Forres, Moray, Scotland
- Coordinates: 57°36′50.87″N 03°37′12.14″W
- Owner: Gordon & MacPhail
- Founded: 1898; 128 years ago
- Architect: Charles C. Doig
- Status: Operational
- Water source: Chapelton Springs in the Romach Hills
- No. of stills: 1 wash stills 1 spirit stlls
- Capacity: 400,000 litres
- Website: www.benromach.com

Benromach
- Type: Single malt

Map
- Benromach (Moray)

Benromach distillery is a Speyside distillery founded by Duncan McCallum and F.W. Brickman in 1898 and currently owned and run by Gordon and Macphail of Elgin. It is situated near Forres in Moray and is fed with spring water from the Chapelton Springs in the Romach Hills beside Forres.

== History ==
Duncan MacCallum and F.W. Brickmann founded the Benromach Distillery Company in 1898. Duncan MacCallum had previously been working at the Glen Nevis Distillery in Campbeltown and FW Brickmann was a spirit broker in Leith, Edinburgh. Construction work started at the site of Benromach Distillery in 1898 however due to the depression in the Scotch Whisky industry in 1898 the distillery did not start producing whisky until 1900 but closed the same year due to a lack of money.

In 1911 Benromach was acquired by the London based Harvey McNair & Co who continued distilling until the onset of the First World War. After the war Benromach was acquired by Benromach Distillery Ltd and was run by this new private company until 1925. In 1938 Benromach was acquired by Associated Scottish Distilleries Ltd which later became a part of Scottish Malt Distillers Ltd. Between 1966 and 1974 the distillery was modernised and continued to run until 1983 when the distillery was officially closed.

In 1993 Gordon and MacPhail took over the site and in 1997 they started to restore the distillery to a working order. The design of the distillery was changed slightly to allow it to be operated by one man. Finally in 1998 the distillery was officially reopened by Charles, Prince of Wales and bottling of the new malt started in 2004.

At the World Whisky Awards 2014, Benromach 10 Years Old won gold in the "Best Speyside Single Malt – 12 Years and Under" category.

Scotland's Malt Whisky Trail is a tourism initiative featuring seven working Speyside distilleries including Benromach, a historic distillery (Dallas Dhu, now a museum) and the Speyside Cooperage. According to a BBC article, visitors can try some of the whiskies and "see the traditional dunnage warehouse (where the whiskys are stored to mature), the mash tun, the burnished copper stills — and the cask signed by Prince Charles".

The distillery released its first gin, Red Door, in July 2018. The gin is vapour-infused with eight botanicals, including rowan berries and sea buckthorn The gin was named after the distillery's painted-red doors; a dedicated gin tour was launched at Benromach in August 2019. A limited release winter gin followed later that year.

== Production information ==
- Mash tuns: 1, Stainless steel mash tun capable of holding 1.5 tonnes of mash
- Wash backs: 13, 11,000 litre larch wash backs
- Wash stills: 1, 7,500 litre charged steam heated wash still
- Spirit stills: 1, 5,000 litre charged steam heated spirit still

Benromach's annual output is around 400,000 litres of cask strength whisky.

== Products ==
=== Current products ===
- Benromach 5 Years Old Single Malt Scotch Whisky (40% ABV)
- Benromach 10 Years Old Single Malt Scotch Whisky (43% ABV)
- Benromach Peat Smoke (46% ABV)
- Benromach Organic Special Edition, A certified organic single malt Scotch whisky (46% ABV)
- Benromach Origins Batch 1 - Golden Promise (50% ABV)
- Benromach Origins Batch 2 - Port Pipes (50% ABV)
- Benromach Origins Batch 3 - Optic (50% ABV)
- Benromach 15 Years Old (43% ABV)
- Benromach 21 Year Old (43% ABV)
- Benromach 25 Year Old (43% ABV)
- Benromach Cask Strength 1980 (54.2% ABV)
- Benromach Vintage 1968 (43% ABV)
- Benromach Classic 55 Year Old (42.4% ABV)

=== Past products ===
- Benromach Tokaji Wood Finish
- Benromach Sassicaia Wood Finish (45% ABV)
- Benromach Port Wood Finish 22 Year Old (45% ABV)

== See also ==
- Whisky
- Scotch whisky
- List of whisky brands
- List of distilleries in Scotland
