= Polyakov (disambiguation) =

Polyakov is a Russian-language surname.

Polyakov or Poliakov may also refer to:

- Polyakov (rural locality), name of several rural localities in Russia
- Poliakov (vodka), a French vodka brand
- Polyakov action, two-dimensional action of a conformal field theory describing the worldsheet of a string in string theory

== See also ==
- 't Hooft–Polyakov monopole, a topological soliton similar to the Dirac monopole but without any singularities
