= Glen Moray distillery =

Distillery in Moray, Scotland

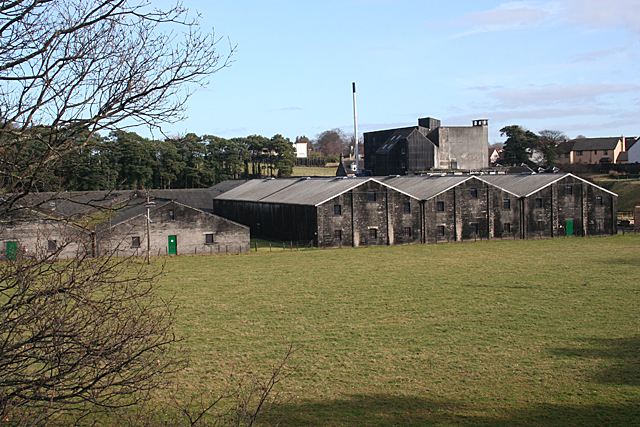

Region: Speyside
- Location: Elgin, Moray, Scotland
- Coordinates: 57°38′40″N 03°20′28″W
- Owner: La Martiniquaise
- Founded: 1897; 129 years ago
- Status: Operational
- Water source: River Lossie
- No. of stills: 4 wash stills 6 spirit stills
- Capacity: 3.3 million litres per annum
- Website: www.glenmoray.com

Glen Moray
- Type: Single malt
- Age(s): 10, 12, 15, 18 and 21 years
- Cask type(s): American oak
- ABV: 40–56.6%

Map
- Glen Moray (Moray)

Glen Moray distillery (/ɡlɛnˈmʌri/) is a Speyside distillery producing single malt scotch whisky. Situated on the banks of the River Lossie in Elgin, Moray the distillery started production in September 1897. It was sold in 2008 by the Glenmorangie Company Ltd. to La Martiniquaise.

== History ==
Glen Moray started life as West Brewery in Elgin run by Robert Thorne & Sons, and was converted to a distillery with 2 stills in 1897. Following a fire and extensive rebuilding program at their Aberlour Distillery, the company focused on production of Aberlour whisky, allowing the Glen Moray distillery to run down. It was closed in 1910.

The distillery was purchased by the owners of the Glenmorangie Distillery, the MacDonald and Muir families at some time during the 1920s. The distillery received 2 additional stills in 1958 and prior to recent overhauls had an annual capacity of around 2,000,000 litres.

In 2004, MacDonald and Muir families sold Glen Moray distillery and Glenmorangie distillery to LVMH.

In 2008, LVMH sold Glen Moray distillery to La Martiniquaise.

Currently, Glen Moray distillery has an annual capacity of 8,500,000 litres.

== Production ==
La Martiniquaise uses part of its production in their blended Whisky Cutty Sark and Label 5, along with its Starlaw distillery in West Lothian. The distillery was expanded in 2012 to produce 3,300,000 litres annually from 3 wash stills and 3 spirit stills. 2016 saw further expansion and development of the site with a growth in production to around 5,500,000 litres annually. Following further upgrades completed as of 2023, the distillery has an annual capacity of 8,500,000 litres from 4 wash stills and 6 spirit stills.

== Visitor centre ==
The distillery has a visitor centre which offers tours and tastings year-round. Details can be found on the company website here: Distillery ToursScotland's Malt Whisky Trail is a tourism initiative featuring seven working Speyside distilleries including Glen Moray, a historic distillery (Dallas Dhu, now a museum) and the Speyside Cooperage.

== Awards and accolades ==
Glen Moray has won many awards over the years through competitions such as the IWSC, ISC, WWA and others.

Glen Moray 1994 Sherry Cask Finish is the Best Scotch Speyside Single Cask Single Malt Category Winner of 21 & over in the World Whiskies Awards 2018. In the 2024 World Whiskies Awards, Glen Moray’s Phoenix Rising won Best Scotch Speyside Single Malt.
