= Starlaw distillery =

Distillery in West Lothian, Scotland

Coordinates: 55°53′19″N 3°34′40″W

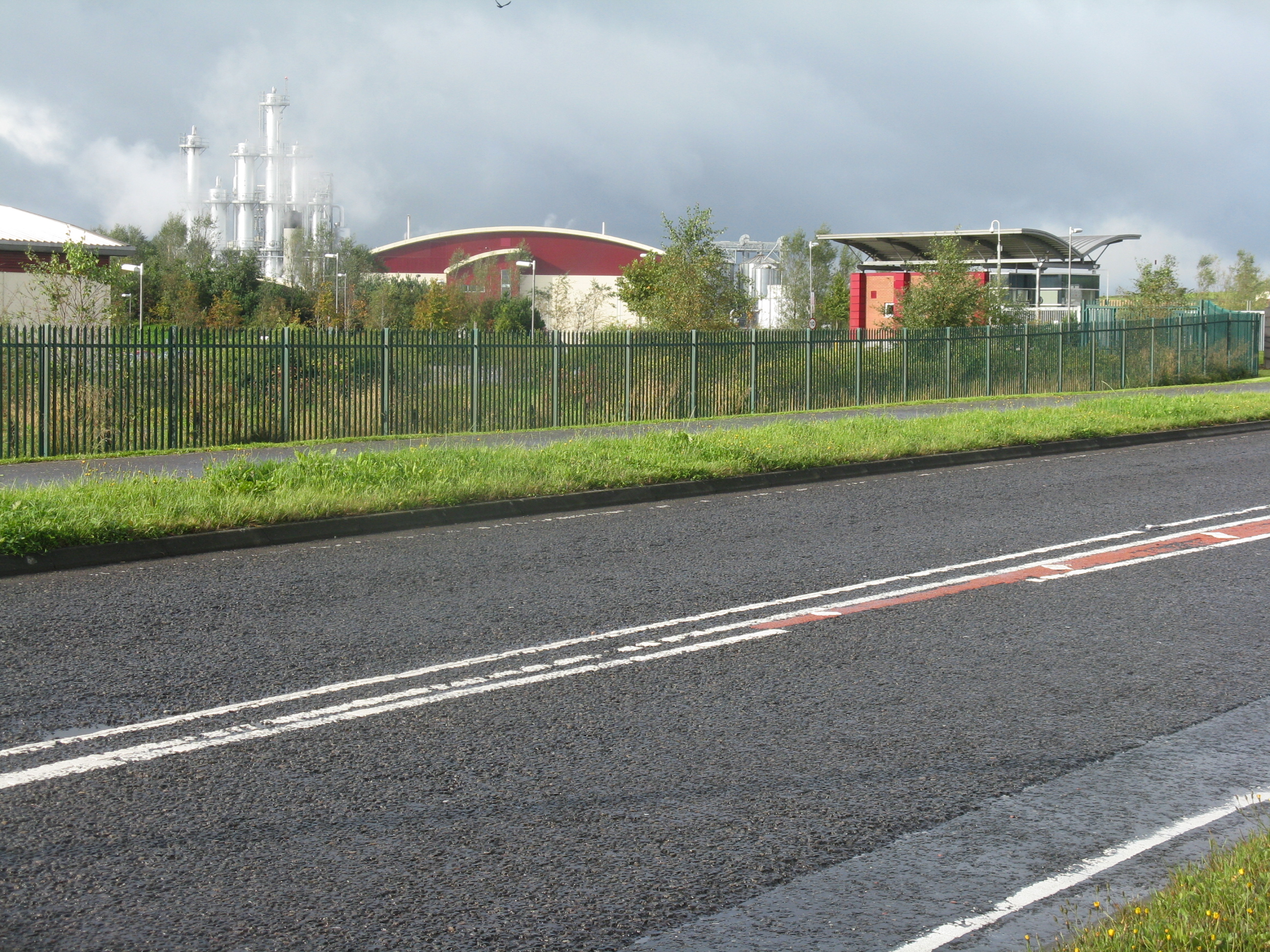
- Location: Bathgate, Scotland, UK
- Owner: La Martiniquaise
- Founded: 2010
- No. of stills: 5 columns stills
- Capacity: 25,000,000 L

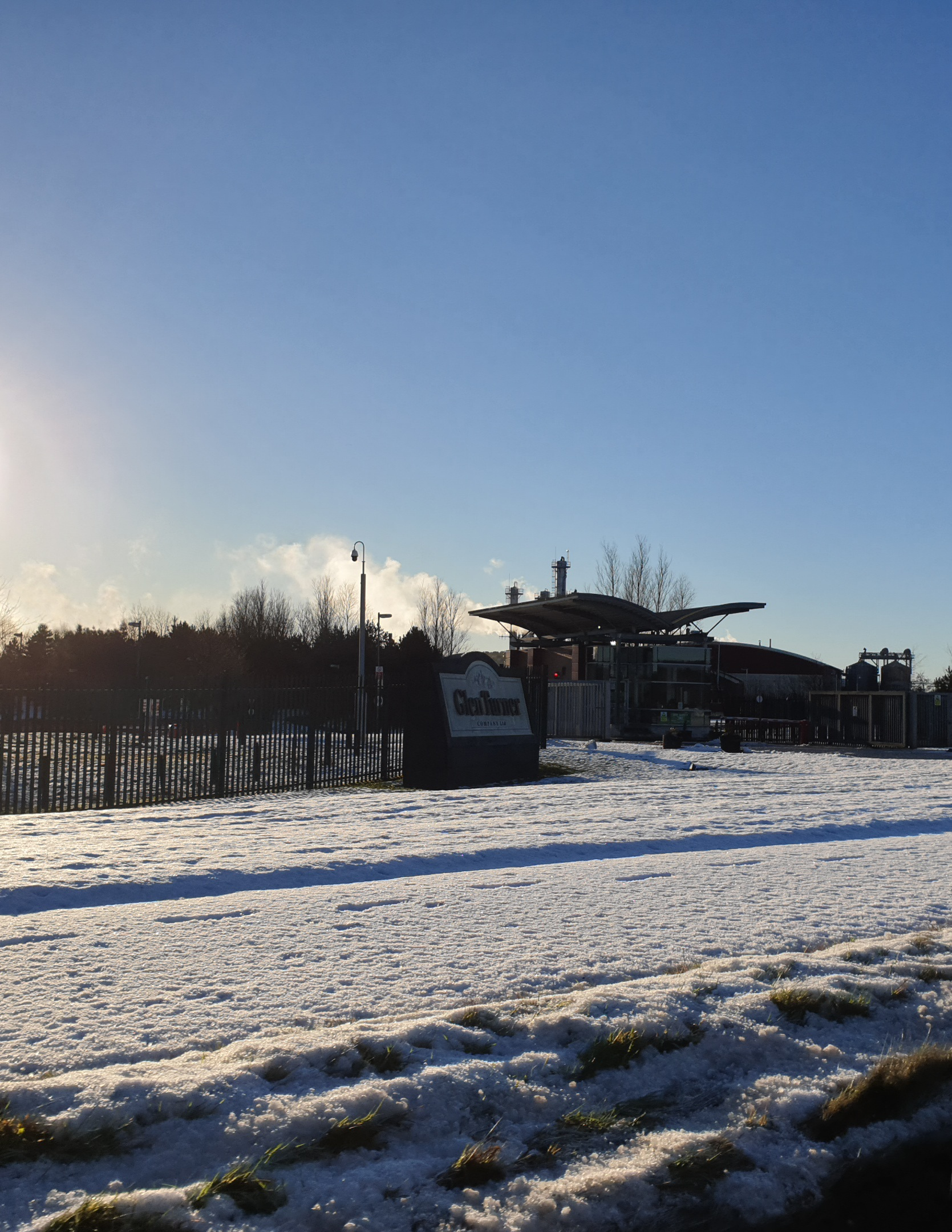
The entrance of the distillery on Starlaw road

Starlaw distillery (sometimes known as Glen Turner distillery) is a grain whisky distillery located in Bathgate, Scotland.

== History ==
The distillery opened in 2010 and is owned by French drinks group La Martiniquaise, as part of its Scottish subsidiary Glen Turner Company Ltd.

Along with Glen Moray distillery in Speyside it provides whisky for the company's Cutty Sark and Label 5 blended Scotch whisky brands.

The distillery is integrated with a vatting, blending and bottling plant and has a capacity of 400,000 bottles per year. The distillery can produce 25 million litres annually and has 29 ageing warehouses (cellars) across 75 hectares at the distillery to allow for the maturation of over 600,000 barrels.

In 2021, plans were submitted to West Lothian Council to extend the distillery site and create 21 new maturation warehouses. However, the planning application was rejected by the council in August 2021, following a list of objections received.

== See also ==
- List of distilleries in Scotland
- List of whisky brands
