= Iain Tennant =

British businessman (1919–2006)

Sir Iain Tennant KT FRSA
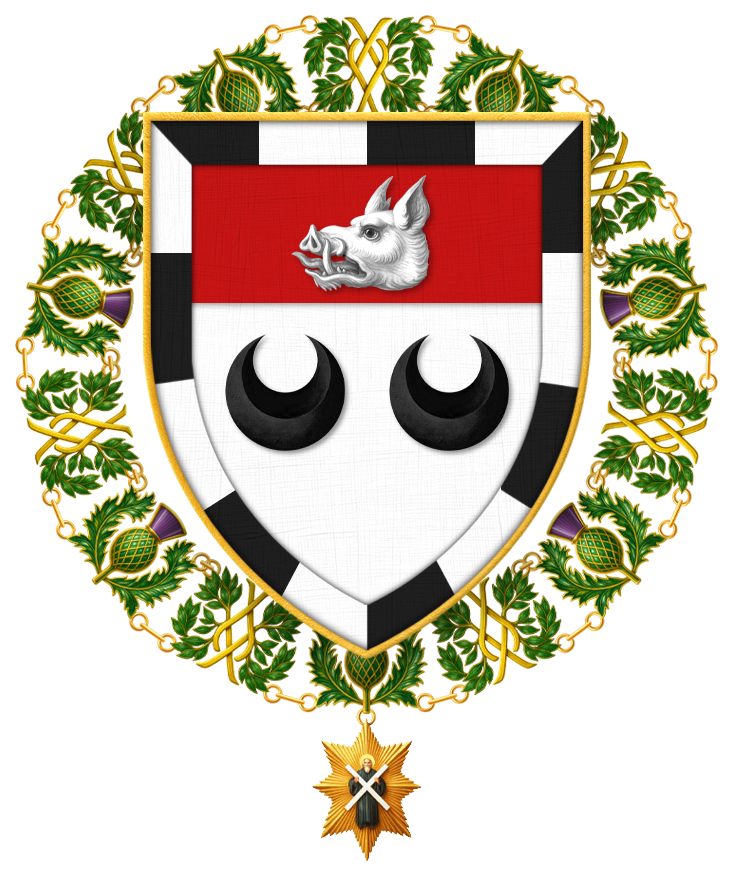
- Shield of Arms of Sir Iain Tennant, KT, encircled by the collar of the Order of the Thistle
- Born: 11 March 1919; North Berwick, Scotland
- Died: 25 September 2006 (aged 87); Elgin, Moray, Scotland
- Occupation: Businessman
- Spouse: Lady Margret Helen Isla Marion Ogilvy (m. 1946)
- Children: 3

Sir Iain Mark Tennant KT FRSA (11 March 1919 – 25 September 2006) was a Scottish businessman.

== Life and career ==
Born in North Berwick, the only son of John Edward Tennant and Georgina Helen Kirkpatrick, he was educated at Eton College and Magdalene College, Cambridge. He served in Egypt with the 2nd Battalion, Scots Guards from 1940 to 1942, and was an intelligence officer with 201 Guards' Brigade. He was captured at the surrender of Tobruk and was a prisoner of war in Italy and Germany until 1945.

In 1946, he married Lady Margaret Helen Isla Marion Ogilvy (1920–2014), daughter of Colonel David Ogilvy, 12th Earl of Airlie in Westminster. and had a two sons, Mark and Christopher and a daughter; Christopher died before his death in 2006. His daughter, Emma, married Sir Jocelyn Stevens.

Tennant's business appointments include chairman of Grampian Television from 1968 to 1989 (he was vice-chairman from 1960 to 1968), director of Caledonian Associated Cinemas from 1950 to 1990; director of Clydesdale Bank from 1969 to 1989; director of Abbey National Building Society; and honorary director with Seagram Co Ltd; chairman of Glenlivet and Glen Grant Distilleries Ltd; and was chairman of the board of Gordonstoun School from 1957 to 1972.

Tennant was a member of the Royal Company of Archers from 1950. He was a Deputy Lieutenant of Moray in 1954, alongside Kenneth Mackessack. He was Lord Lieutenant of Moray from 1963 to 1994, Lord High Commissioner to the General Assembly of the Church of Scotland in 1988 and 1989, and Crown Estate commissioner for Scotland from 1970 to 1990. He was appointed a Knight of the Thistle in 1986. He also served on Moray and Nairn County Council from 1956 to 1964. He was a fellow of the Royal Society of Arts.

Honorary titles
Preceded by Sir Henry Houldsworth	Lord Lieutenant of Moray; 1963–1994	Succeeded by George Arthur Chesworth
Preceded by John Arbuthnott, 16th Viscount of Arbuthnott	Lord High Commissioner to the General Assembly of the Church of Scotland; 1988–1989	Succeeded by Donald Ross, Lord Ross
