= Cardhu distillery =

Whisky distillery in Speyside, Scotland

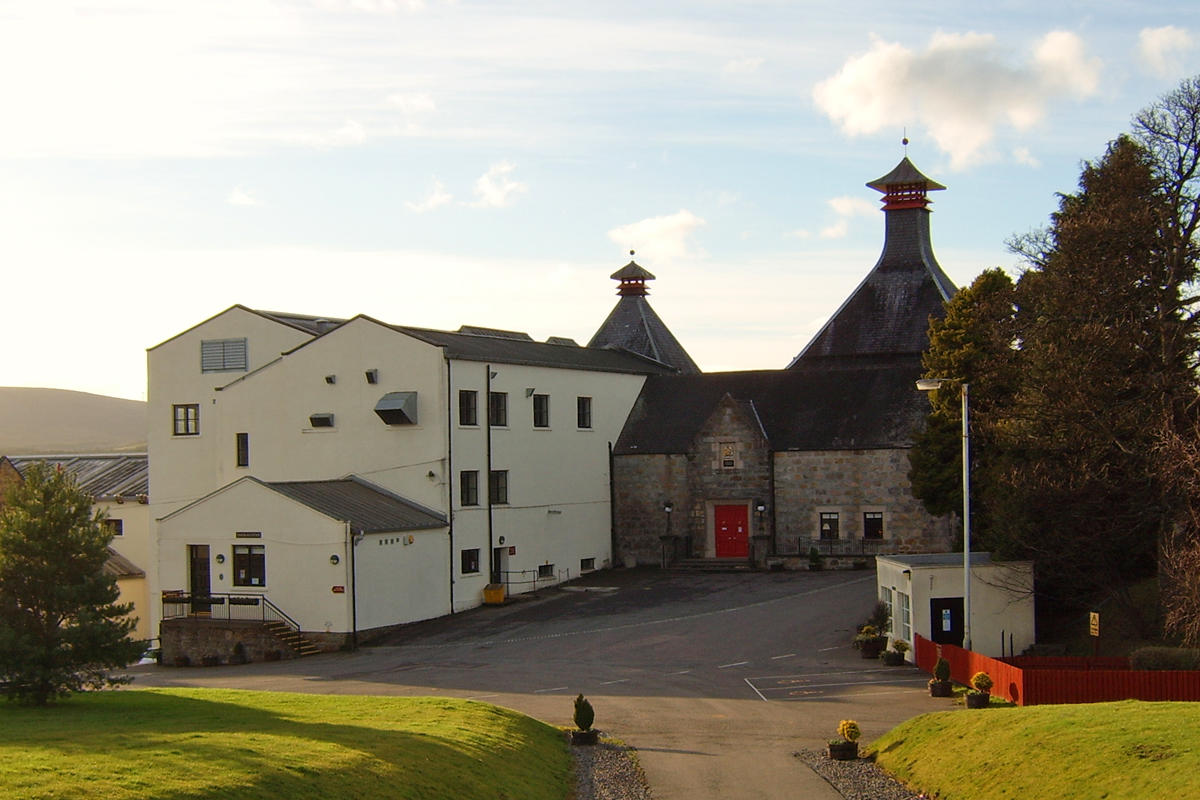

Region: Speyside
- Location: Archiestown, Moray, Scotland
- Coordinates: 57°28′13.7″N 3°21′00.2″W
- Owner: Diageo
- Founded: 1823
- Founder: John & Helen Cumming
- Water source: Sources in the Mannoch Hills and Lyne Burn
- No. of stills: 3 wash stills (12,000 L); 3 wash stills (10,500 L)
- Capacity: 3,500,000 L
- Website: Cardhu distillery

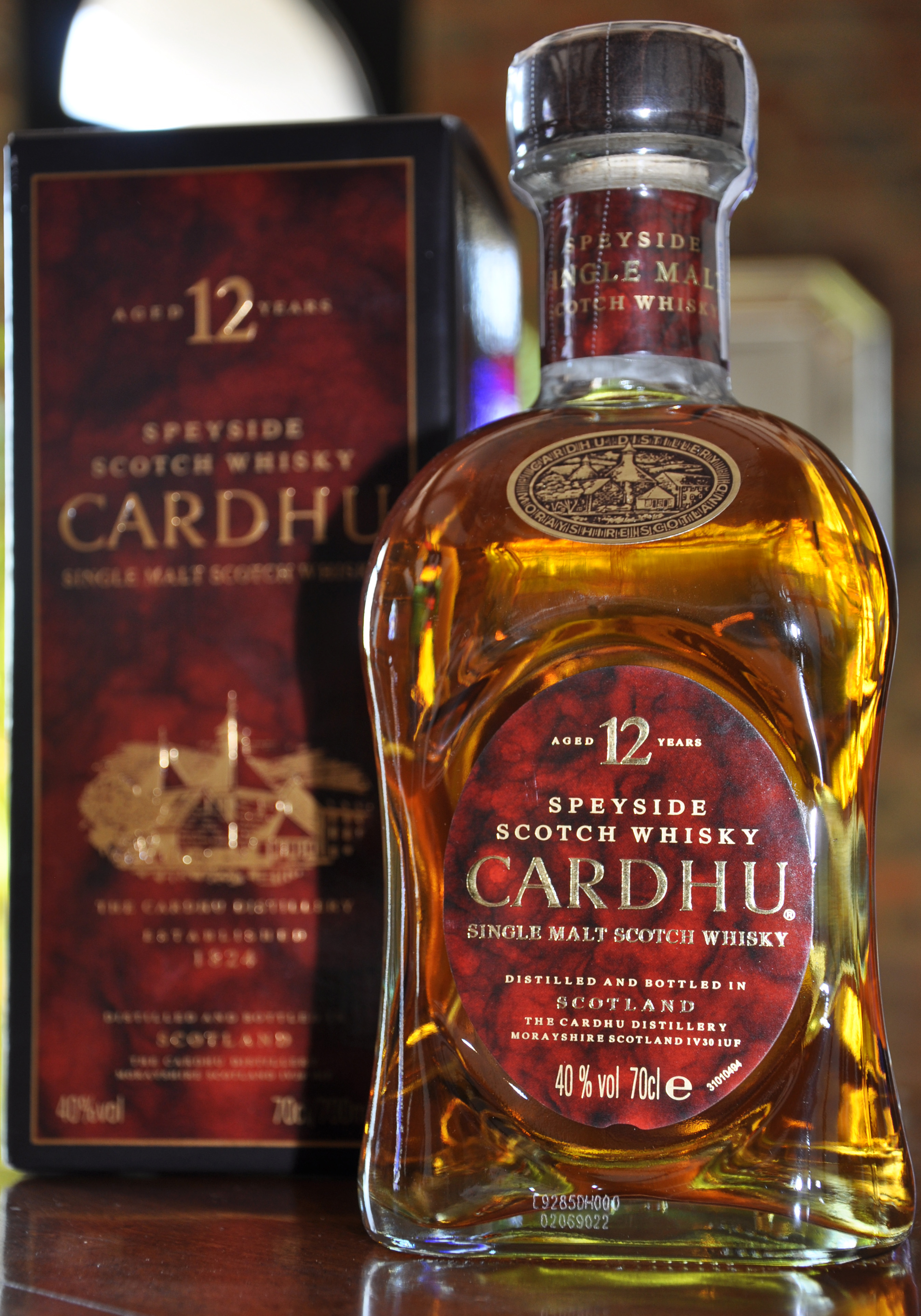

Cardhu distillery is a Speyside single malt Scotch whisky distillery near Archiestown, Moray, Scotland. It was founded in 1824 by whisky smuggler John Cumming and his wife Helen.

The distillery is run by Diageo and alongside the single malt Scotch, the distillery's whisky makes up an important part of the Johnnie Walker blended whiskies. The word "Cardhu" derives from the Scottish Gaelic Carn Dubh, meaning "Black Rock".

== History ==
The distillery was established in 1824 by John Cumming, who had previously been a whisky smuggler. The distillery was sited high up on Mannoch Hill, above the River Spey due to the peat softening the water. It started as farm distillery working on a seasonal basis after the harvest had been gathered. It was mainly run by Helen Cumming who used to sell bottles of whisky to passers-by through the window of their farmhouse. Due to the hill the farm distillery was on, Helen could see the police coming and would throw flour on herself and say that she was baking bread to disguise the smell. She would then offer them tea and fly a flag outside so that the other nearby distilleries could see and take prompt action.

In 1885, the distillery was rebuilt on a new piece of land but continued to stay in the hands of the Cummings, being run by Elizabeth Cumming, the daughter-in-law of John and Helen Cumming. The stills from the old distillery building were sold to William Grant who set up Glenfiddich distillery. The new building and stills meant that Cardhu could produce triple the amount of whisky it had previously produced. These higher production levels led to Johnnie Walker and Sons buying much of Cardhu's output to put into their increasingly popular blend.

In 1893, Elizabeth Cumming sold the distillery to Johnnie Walker and Sons on the condition that the Cumming family could continue the day-to-day running of the distillery. The company joined Distillers Company in 1925. Cardhu distillery kept working under these conditions until the onset of the Second World War when wartime restrictions meant that it was harder to use barley for distilling purposes.

In 1960, the distillery's still-house, mash-house and tun-room were rebuilt, and in 1970, steam coils were introduced to heat the stills and the number of stills was increased to six. Spring water from Mannoch Hill started to be mixed with water from the local Lynne burn to supply the increased production of the distillery.

Guinness acquired The Distillers Company in 1986. Guinness merged with Grand Metropolitan in 1997 to form Diageo.

== Variants ==
- Cardhu 12 Year Old (40% ABV)
- Cardhu 15 Year Old (40% ABV)
- Cardhu 18 Year Old (40% ABV)
- Cardhu Gold Reserve (40% ABV)
- Cardhu Amber Rock (40% ABV)

=== Special Releases Series ===
- 2014: Cardhu 21 Year Old (54.2% ABV)
- 2019: Cardhu 14 Year Old (55% ABV)
- 2020: Cardhu 11 Year Old (56% ABV)
- 2020: Cardhu 16 Year Old - Four Corners of Scotland Collection (58.2% ABV)
- 2021: Cardhu 14 Year Old (55% ABV)
- 2022: Cardhu 16 Year Old (58% ABV)
- 2024: Cardhu 12 Year Old 200th anniversary edition (40% ABV)

== Scotland's Malt Whisky Trail ==
Scotland's Malt Whisky Trail is a tourism initiative featuring seven working Speyside distilleries including Cardhu, a historic distillery (Dallas Dhu, now a museum) and the Speyside Cooperage. According to a BBC article, "Cardhu is a Scotch that may taste familiar because it is used in Johnnie Walker’s blended whiskies".

== 'Pure malt' controversy ==
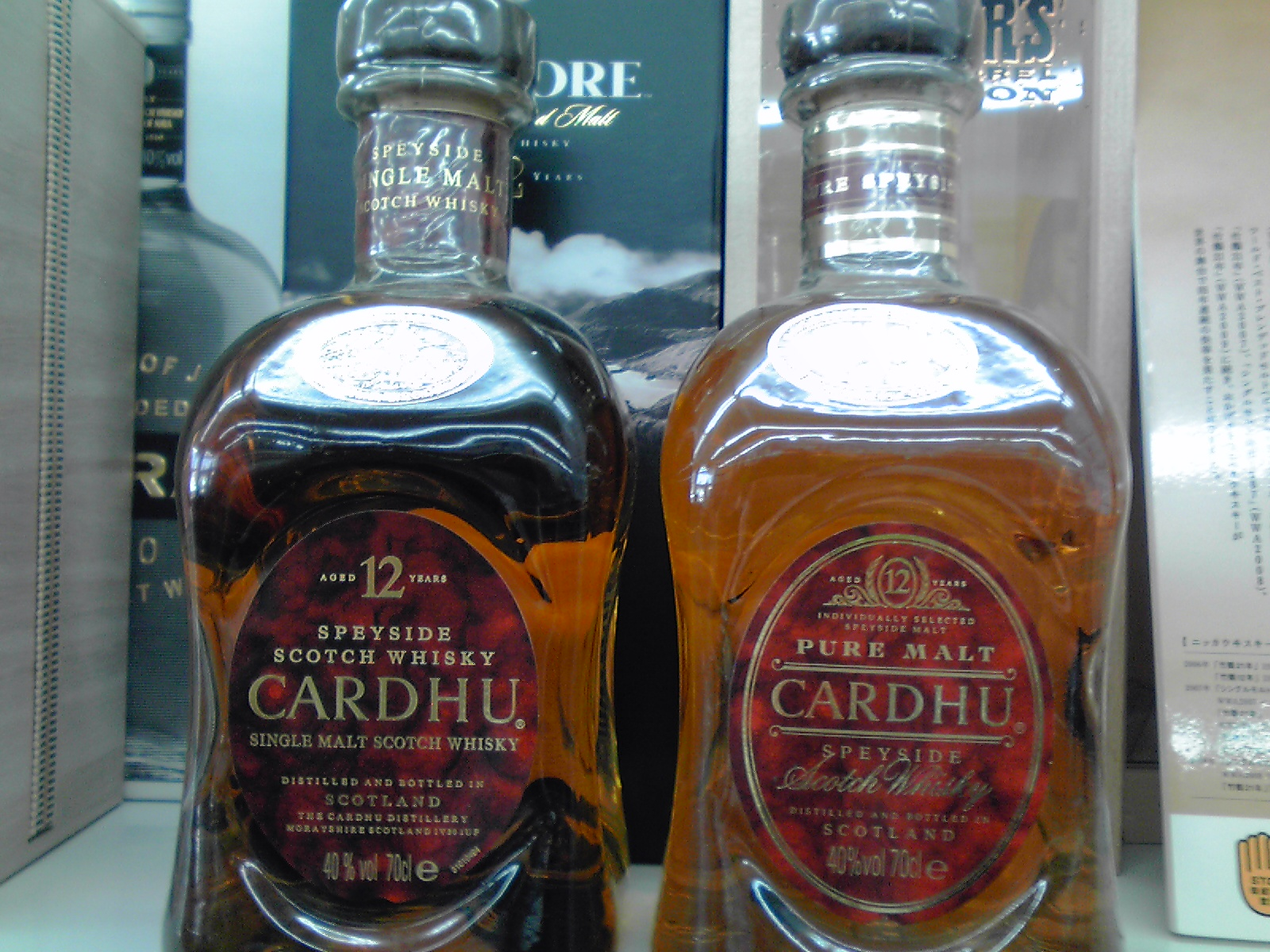
Cardhu Single Malt and original label Pure Malt side by side

In December 2003, parent company Diageo caused controversy by halting the production of Cardhu single malt and replacing it with a blended malt which they labelled a 'pure malt' using the same bottle design and label as its single malt. The decision by Diageo angered both consumers and other whisky producers who were worried that the single malt image would be damaged. Diageo responded to the criticism by agreeing to change the label style and colour of their pure malt in order to avoid consumer confusion. Sales of Cardhu pure malt dropped substantially due to the change.

Cardhu recommenced producing a single malt in 2006. Cardhu single malt is 40% ABV.

== See also ==
- List of whisky brands
- List of distilleries in Scotland
