= Dipple =

Dipple may refer to:

- Dipple, Ohio, United States
- Dipple, Moray, Scotland
- Alan Dipple (born 1956), Australian racing cyclist
- Jo Dipple (born 1968), British businesswoman
- Dipple, a book series by Andre Norton

== See also ==
- Dippel, a surname
