= Charenton-le-Pont =

- Commune
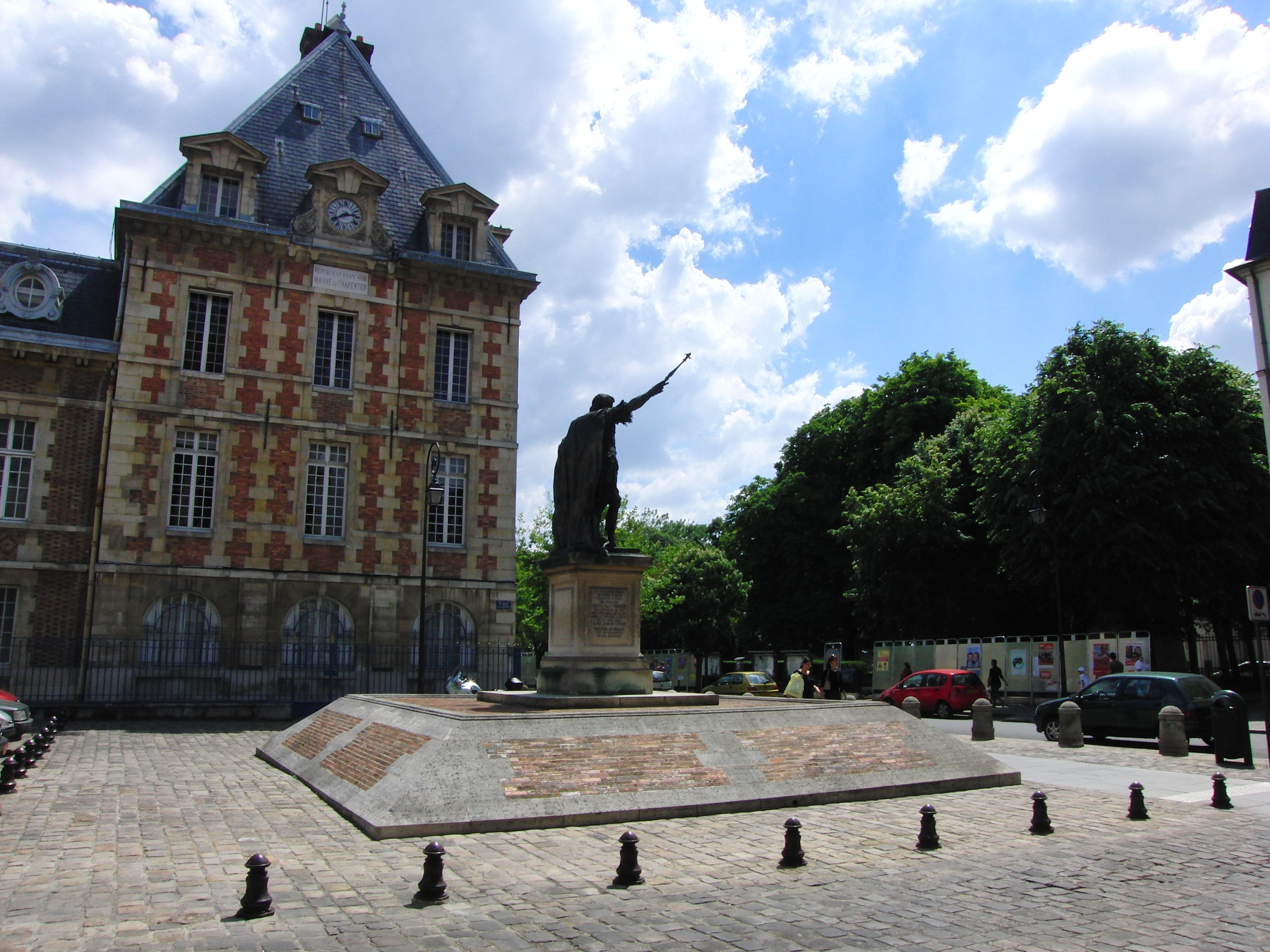
- Arthur Dussault Square in Charenton showing the Hôtel de Ville (on the left) and the statue of Henry IV (in the centre)

- Coat of arms

- Location (in red) within Paris inner suburbs
- Location of Charenton-le-Pont
- Location within France Location within Île-de-France (region)
- Coordinates: 48°49′35″N 2°24′18″E
- Country: France
- Region: Île-de-France
- Department: Val-de-Marne
- Arrondissement: Nogent-sur-Marne
- Canton: Charenton-le-Pont
- Intercommunality: Grand Paris

Government
  - Mayor (2026–32): Hervé Gicquel
- Area^{1}: 1.85 km^{2} (0.71 sq mi)
- Elevation: 36 m (118 ft)
- Highest elevation: 57 m (187 ft)
- Lowest elevation: 28 m (92 ft)
- Population (2023): 28,830
  - Density: 15,600/km^{2} (40,400/sq mi)
- Demonym: Charentonnais
- Time zone: UTC+01:00 (CET)
  - Summer (DST): UTC+02:00 (CEST)
- INSEE/Postal code: 94018 /94220
- Website: www.charenton.fr
- ^{1} French Land Register data, which excludes lakes, ponds, glaciers > 1 km^{2} (0.386 sq mi or 247 acres) and river estuaries.

Charenton-le-Pont (French pronunciation: [ʃaʁɑ̃tɔ̃ lə pɔ̃]; lit. 'Charenton-the-Bridge') or simply Charenton is a commune situated just southeast of Paris, France. It is located 6.2 km (3.9 mi) from the centre of Paris, to the north of the confluence of the Seine and Marne rivers; the 'Bridge' part of the name refers to the stone bridge across the Marne. It is one of the most densely populated municipalities in Europe.

The Charenton psychiatric hospital is located in the neighbouring commune of Charenton-Saint-Maurice, which changed its name in 1842 to Saint-Maurice.

== History ==
A Bronze Age hoard of weapons was found in the river Seine at Charenton in the late 19th century. Comprising swords, axes, spearheads and other miscellaneous objects, it is now in the British Museum in London.

Charenton most likely comes from the Gallo-Roman personal name Carantius or Carentius, and means "the estate of Carantius/Carentius."

Charenton was always a point of importance for the defence of the capital, and was frequently the scene of bloody conflicts. The Fort de Charenton, located in neighbouring Maisons-Alfort but intended to defend Charenton, is one of the older forts of the Paris defence. The Hôtel de Ville was built as a private residence in 1612.

In the 16th and 17th centuries, Charenton was the scene of the ecclesiastical councils of the Protestant party, which had its principal church in the town.

In the now-named commune of Saint-Maurice, adjoining Charenton to the east, is the Hospice de Charenton, a psychiatric hospital, the foundation of which dates from 1641. Until the time of the Revolution it was used as a general hospital, and even as a prison, but from 1802 onwards it was specially appropriated to the treatment of mental illness.

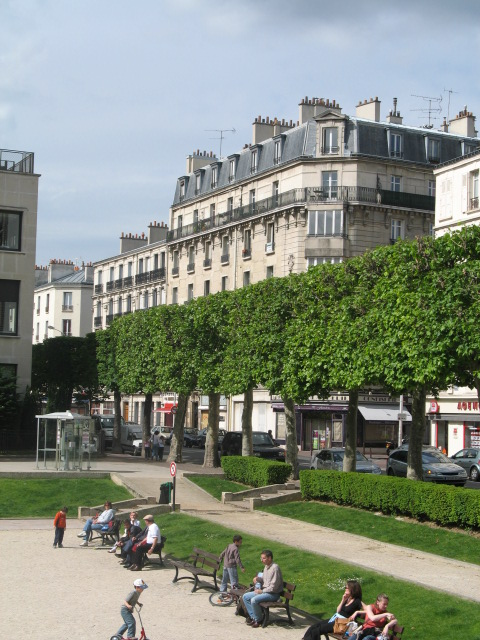
Public park in Charenton-le-Pont, nearby the Charenton–Écoles Métro station

On 1 January 1860, the City of Paris was enlarged by annexing neighbouring communes. On that occasion, half of the commune of Bercy was annexed to the city of the Paris, and the remaining half was annexed to Charenton-le-Pont.

In 1929, the commune of Charenton-le-Pont lost about a third of its territory when the City of Paris annexed the Bois de Vincennes, a small part of which belonged to Charenton-le-Pont.

== Population ==
Historical population

| Year | Pop. | ±% p.a. |
|---|---|---|
| 1793 | 1,500 | — |
| 1800 | 1,126 | −4.01% |
| 1806 | 1,264 | +1.95% |
| 1821 | 1,400 | +0.68% |
| 1831 | 1,977 | +3.51% |
| 1836 | 2,558 | +5.29% |
| 1841 | 3,393 | +5.81% |
| 1846 | 3,505 | +0.65% |
| 1851 | 3,219 | −1.69% |
| 1856 | 4,258 | +5.75% |
| 1861 | 5,534 | +5.38% |
| 1866 | 6,190 | +2.27% |
| 1872 | 7,141 | +2.41% |
| 1876 | 8,822 | +5.43% |
| 1881 | 11,826 | +6.04% |
| 1886 | 13,535 | +2.74% |
| 1891 | 15,306 | +2.49% |
| 1896 | 16,811 | +1.89% |
| 1901 | 17,980 | +1.35% |

| Year | Pop. | ±% p.a. |
|---|---|---|
| 1906 | 18,372 | +0.43% |
| 1911 | 19,499 | +1.20% |
| 1921 | 20,872 | +0.68% |
| 1926 | 20,891 | +0.02% |
| 1931 | 21,098 | +0.20% |
| 1936 | 20,946 | −0.14% |
| 1946 | 21,457 | +0.24% |
| 1954 | 22,079 | +0.36% |
| 1962 | 22,530 | +0.25% |
| 1968 | 22,300 | −0.17% |
| 1975 | 20,468 | −1.22% |
| 1982 | 20,500 | +0.02% |
| 1990 | 21,872 | +0.81% |
| 1999 | 26,582 | +2.19% |
| 2007 | 28,414 | +0.84% |
| 2012 | 30,148 | +1.19% |
| 2017 | 30,374 | +0.15% |
| 2023 | 28,830 | −0.87% |

Source: EHESS and INSEE (1968–2023)

== Transport ==
Charenton-le-Pont is served by two stations on Paris Métro Line 8: Liberté and Charenton — Écoles.

=== History ===
There was also another station in the commune that existed from 1849 to 1942 and then was demolished.

== Education ==
As of 2015 the commune has 14 public and private schools.

- Public preschools (écoles maternelles): 4 vents, Cerisae, Champ des Alouettes, Conflans, Port au Lions, and Valmy
- Public elementary schools: Briand A, Briand B, Desnos, Pasteur, and Valmy
- Collège la Cerisaie (junior high school)
- Lycée Robert Schuman (public senior high school/sixth-form college)
- Notre dame des Missions (private school, elementary through senior high school/sixth form college)

== Sport ==
Charenton shares the association football club CA Paris-Charenton with the nearby town Maisons-Alfort. They play in all red with blue shorts. They are a merger between CA Paris (founded in 1892)—who won the 1920 Coupe de France, were second place in the 1928 Coupe de France, played in the first two seasons of Ligue 1, and then played in Ligue 2 until 1963—and SO Charentonnais (founded in 1904). The two merged in 1964. The club is chaired by Oscar Gonçalves. They mainly play at the Stade Henri Guérin in Charenton, but also play many matches at the Stade Charentonneau in Maisons-Alfort.

== Twin towns - Sister cities ==
Charenton-le-Pont is twinned with:

- Borgo Val di Taro, Emilia Romagna, Italy
- Büren, North Rhine-Westphalia, Germany
- Trowbridge, Wiltshire, United Kingdom
- Tempelhof-Schöneberg, Berlin, Germany
- Zikhron Ya'akov, Haifa District, Israel

== Economy ==
- Essilor, headquarters
- Natixis, the bank has three sites (Liberté 1, Liberté 2 et Bercy) with around 5,000 people
- Crédit Foncier de France, headquarters at 4 quai de Bercy
- Porto Cruz, plant and distribution platform

== See also ==
- Communes of the Val-de-Marne department
- Charenton Metro-Viaduct
- Rue de Paris (Charenton-le-Pont)
