= Cayard =

Cayard is a surname. Notable people with the surname include:

- Jean-Pierre Cayard, French businessman
- Paul Cayard (born 1959), American sailor
