= Seymour Monro =

Scottish army officer (b. 1950)

Major General The Honourable Seymour Monro CBE LVO DL
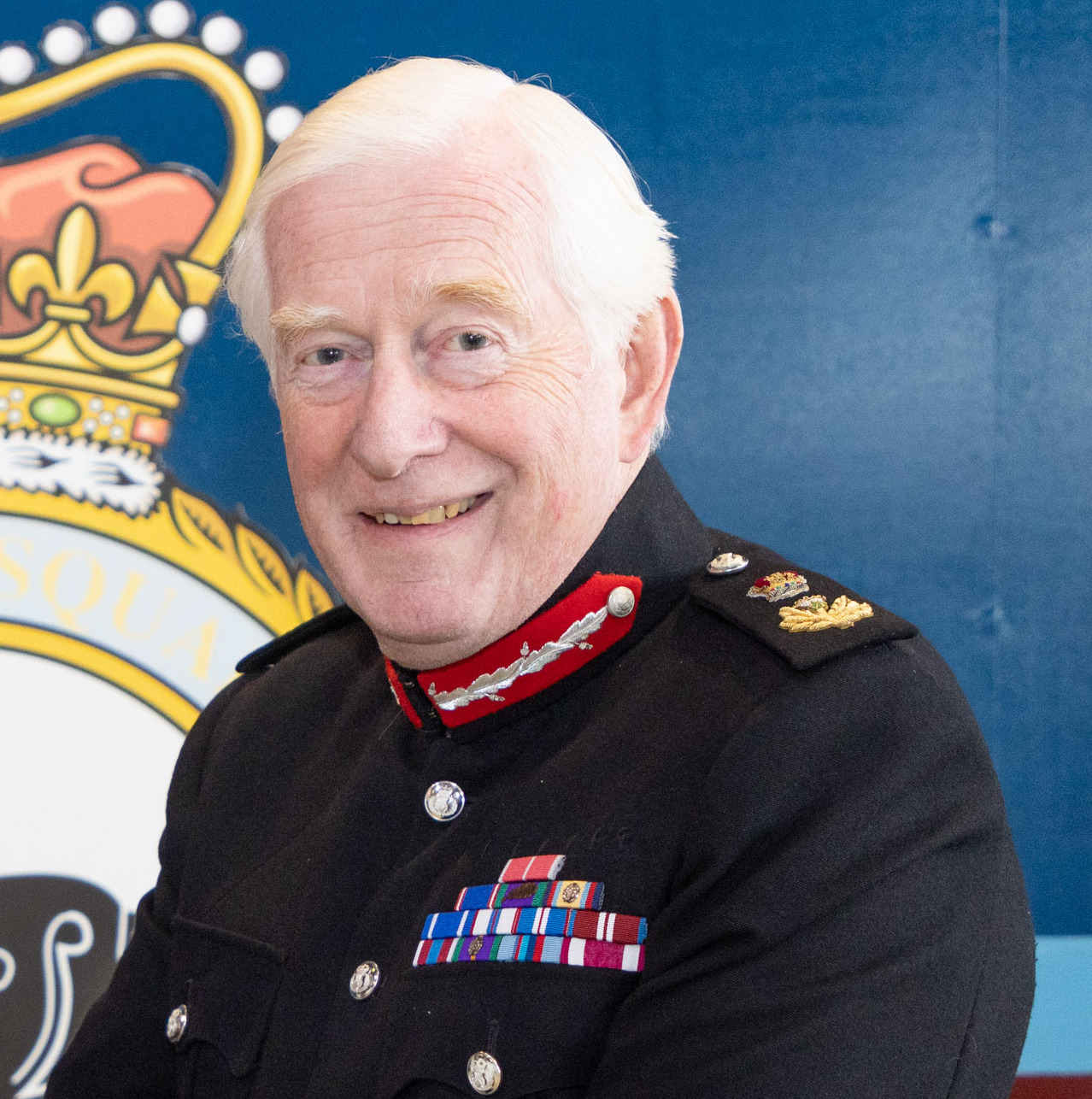
- Monro in 2023

Lord Lieutenant of Moray
- Incumbent
- Assumed office 29 January 2020
- Monarchs: Elizabeth II; Charles III
- Preceded by: Grenville Johnston
- Succeeded by: Alistair Monkman (designate)

Personal details
- Born: 7 May 1950 (age 75)

Military service
- Allegiance: United Kingdom
- Branch/service: British Army
- Years of service: 1970–2003
- Rank: Major General
- Unit: Queen's Own Highlanders
- Battles/wars: The Troubles; First Gulf War

Major General Seymour Hector Russell Hale Monro CBE LVO DL (born 7 May 1950) is a former officer in the British Army and current Lord Lieutenant of Moray.

== Early life ==
Monro was born in Edinburgh, Scotland, on 7 May 1950, the eldest son of Hector Monro, Baron Monro of Langholm, a Scottish Conservative and Unionist Party politician, and his wife Anne. He was educated at Cargilfield Preparatory School and Glenalmond College, independent schools in Scotland, then trained at the Royal Military Academy Sandhurst.

== Career ==
=== Military service ===
From Sandhurst, where he was awarded the Sword of Honour, in 1970 Monro was commissioned into the Queen's Own Highlanders. He commanded the 1st Battalion the Queens Own Highlanders in Belfast and in the First Gulf War. Subsequently, he commanded 39 Infantry Brigade in Belfast and went on to serve as the British Army's Director of Infantry. He was President of the Regular Commissions Board from October 1996 to January 1998. His last military appointment was as Deputy Commander of the NATO Rapid Deployable Corps, in Italy.

=== Business career ===
Monro later became Executive Director of the Atlantic Salmon Trust and Adjutant of The Queen's Body Guard for Scotland and later Chairman of the Highlanders’ Museum at Fort George where he was responsible for its £2.75 million upgrade project. He has also been Chairman of the Prince's Trust in the Highlands and of the Findhorn, Nairn and Lossie Fisheries’ trust. He served on the board of Cairngorm Mountain Ltd.

He was instrumental in establishing The Highland Military Tattoo at Fort George in 2014 and was its Executive Chairman and Tattoo Director until it ceased in 2017. He was also Honorary Air Commodore of 2622 (Highland) Squadron The Royal Auxiliary Air Force at RAF Lossiemouth from 2008 to 2019.

He is currently Chairman of the Northern Meeting Piping Trust. He is also Honorary President of Forres and District Pipe Band, of the Forres Branch of the Royal British Legion Scotland, of Forres in Bloom and of the Brisbane Observatory Trust in Largs. He is also Chairman (Designate) of the Leanchoil Trust which will turn the former cottage hospital in Forres into a Veterans’ Activity Centre and a local community health and wellbeing hub.

== Honours ==
Monro is appointed Lord-Lieutenant for Moray to succeed Lieutenant Colonel Grenville Johnston, who retired on 28 January 2020.

He was appointed a Commander of the Order of the British Empire (CBE) in 1996, and was appointed Lieutenant of the Royal Victorian Order (LVO) in 2010.

=== Medal bar ===

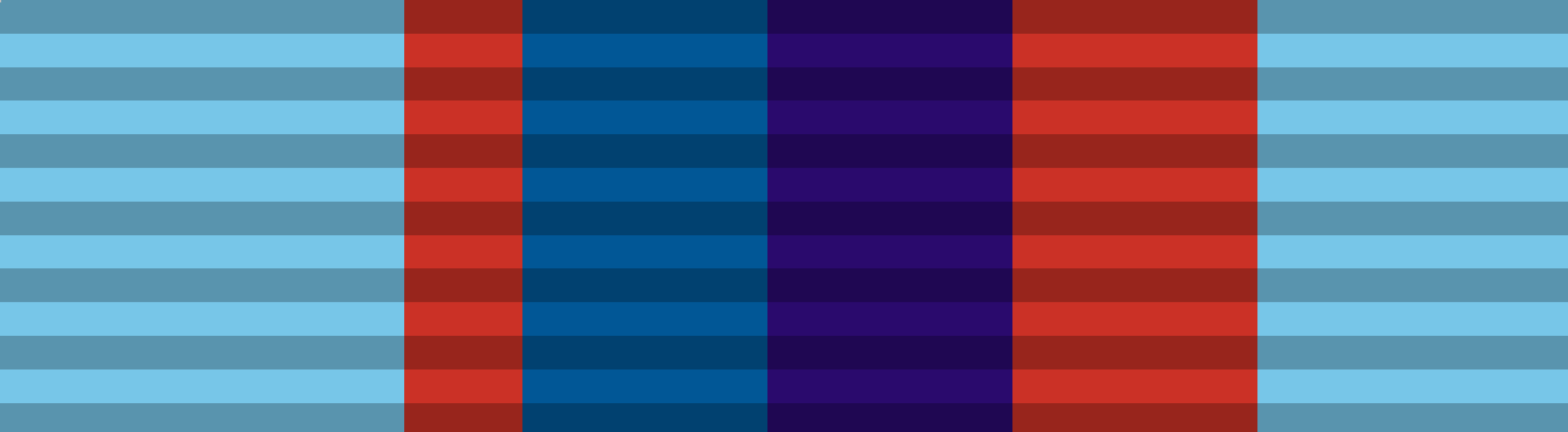
