= George Chesworth =

Royal Air Force officer (1930–2017)

George Arthur Chesworth
- Born: 4 June 1930
- Died: 24 May 2017 (aged 86)
- Military career
- Allegiance: United Kingdom
- Branch: Royal Air Force
- Service years: 1948–1984
- Rank: Air Vice Marshal
- Conflicts: Korean War; Falklands War
- Awards: Companion of the Order of the Bath; Officer of the Order of the British Empire; Distinguished Flying Cross
- Other work: Chief Executive; Lord Lieutenant

Air Vice Marshal George Arthur Chesworth CB, OBE, DFC, JP (4 June 1930 – 24 May 2017) was a senior Royal Air Force officer and Lord Lieutenant of Moray.

== Early life ==
Chesworth was born on 4 June 1930 in Beckenham Kent. He began his association with the Royal Air Force when he joined the Air Training Corps.

== Career ==
He began his military service on 28 July 1948, when he went to the recruitment office to sign on for National Service. He was one of the few National Service pilots. He was commissioned into the RAF in May 1950.

Once Chesworth had completed his flying training, and converted to Sunderland Flying Boats, he joined No. 205 Squadron in the Far East Air Force. He flew many operational sorties against the Chinese in the Korean War for which he was awarded the Distinguished Flying Cross.

After the Korean War ended, Chesworth became a Flying Instructor on Percival Provost at RAF Hullavington. This was followed by a ground tour. He then went to RAF Kinloss as a Shackleton Instructor and finally back to squadron life as a Flight Commander with No. 201 Squadron RAF.

On 15 April 1980, Air Commodore Chesworth was appointed Chief of Staff (Air), Headquarters No. 18 Group RAF, with the acting rank of air vice marshal.

Air Vice Marshal Chesworth retired from the RAF in 1984.

== Later life ==
In 1985, Chesworth became Chief Executive of the Glasgow Garden Festival.

He was Lord Lieutenant of Moray, Scotland between 21 April 1994 and 20 August 2005, when he was replaced by Lieutenant Colonel Grenville Johnston.

On 25 February 2009, Chesworth presented 80 personnel of his previous squadron, No. 201 Squadron RAF, with the Operational Service Medal Afghanistan and the Iraq Medal.

He was the Vice President of Houses for Heroes.

He died on 24 May 2017 at the age of 86.

== Awards and decorations ==
On 23 February 1954, the then Flight Lieutenant Chesworth was awarded the Distinguished Flying Cross "in recognition of gallant and distinguished service in Korea".

In the 1972 New Year Honours, the then Wing Commander Chesworth was appointed Officer of the Order of the British Empire (OBE). On 11 October 1982, he was appointed Companion of the Order of the Bath (CB) "in recognition of service within the operations in the South Atlantic".

He was appointed to the honorary role of Air Commodore of No. 2622 (Highland) Squadron Royal Auxiliary Air Force Regiment based at RAF Lossiemouth in 2001. He held that position for eight years to 2009.

On 3 August 1992, he was appointed as Honorary Colonel of the 76 Engineer Regiment (Volunteers).

== Promotions ==
Rank	Date first held
Pilot Officer	25 May 1950
Flying Officer	25 May 1951
Flight Lieutenant	25 November 1953
Squadron Leader	1 July 1961
Wing Commander	1 January 1966
Group Captain	1 January 1972
Air Commodore	1 July 1976
Air Vice Marshal	1 January 1981

Honorary titles
Preceded by Sir Iain Tennant	Lord Lieutenant of Moray; 1994–2005	Succeeded by Grenville Johnston
