= Lord Lieutenant of Moray =

Ceremonial officer in Moray, Scotland

This is a list of people who have served as Lord Lieutenant of Moray, Scotland. Until 1928 the office was known as Lord Lieutenant of the County of Elgin.

== Lord Lieutenants of Elginshire ==
- Francis Stuart, 9th Earl of Moray 17 March 1794 – 28 August 1810
- Francis Stuart, 10th Earl of Moray 6 September 1810 – 12 January 1848
- Gen. Hon. Sir Alexander Duff 14 February 1848 – 21 March 1851
- James Duff 21 May 1851 – 1856
- George Skene Duff 9 April 1856 – 1872 (resigned)
- Alexander Duff, 1st Duke of Fife 1 January 1872 – July 1902 (resigned)
- Charles Henry Gordon-Lennox, 7th Duke of Richmond 27 August 1902 – 18 January 1928

== Lord Lieutenants of Moray ==
- Charles Henry Gordon-Lennox, 8th Duke of Richmond 14 March 1928 – 7 May 1935
- Francis Douglas Stuart, 18th Earl of Moray 2 August 1935 – 9 July 1943
- Brig Sir Henry Houldsworth 28 September 1943 – 9 October 1963
- Sir Iain Tennant 16 January 1964 – 1994
- AVM George Arthur Chesworth 21 April 1994 – 2005
- Lt-Col. Grenville Johnston 20 August 2005 – 28 January 2020
- Maj Gen Seymour Monro 2020 – 7 May 2025
- Air Commodore Alistair Monkman 7 May 2025 – present

== Deputy lieutenants ==
A deputy lieutenant of Elgin was commissioned by the Lord Lieutenant of Elgin. Deputy lieutenants support the work of the lord-lieutenant. There can be several deputy lieutenants at any time, depending on the population of the county. Their appointment does not terminate with the changing of the lord-lieutenant, but they usually retire at age 75.

=== 19th Century ===
- 17 May 1848: Sir John Macpherson Grant
- 17 May 1848: James Campbell Brodie
- 17 May 1848: George Skene Duff
- 17 May 1848: John Lewis Ricardo
- 17 May 1848: Henry Inglis
- 17 May 1848: Alexander Thomas Wharton Duff
