= Poliakov (vodka) =

French vodka brand

Poliakov is a French vodka brand, owned by La Martiniquaise, France's second-largest spirits group, founded in 1934, by the father of the current head, the billionaire Jean-Pierre Cayard.

Poliakov is a "millionaire" brand, selling in excess of one million nine-litre cases per annum.
