= Charenton station =

Former railway station in Charenton-le-Pont, France

Coordinates: 48.81835°N 2.414814°E

Charenton Gare de Charenton
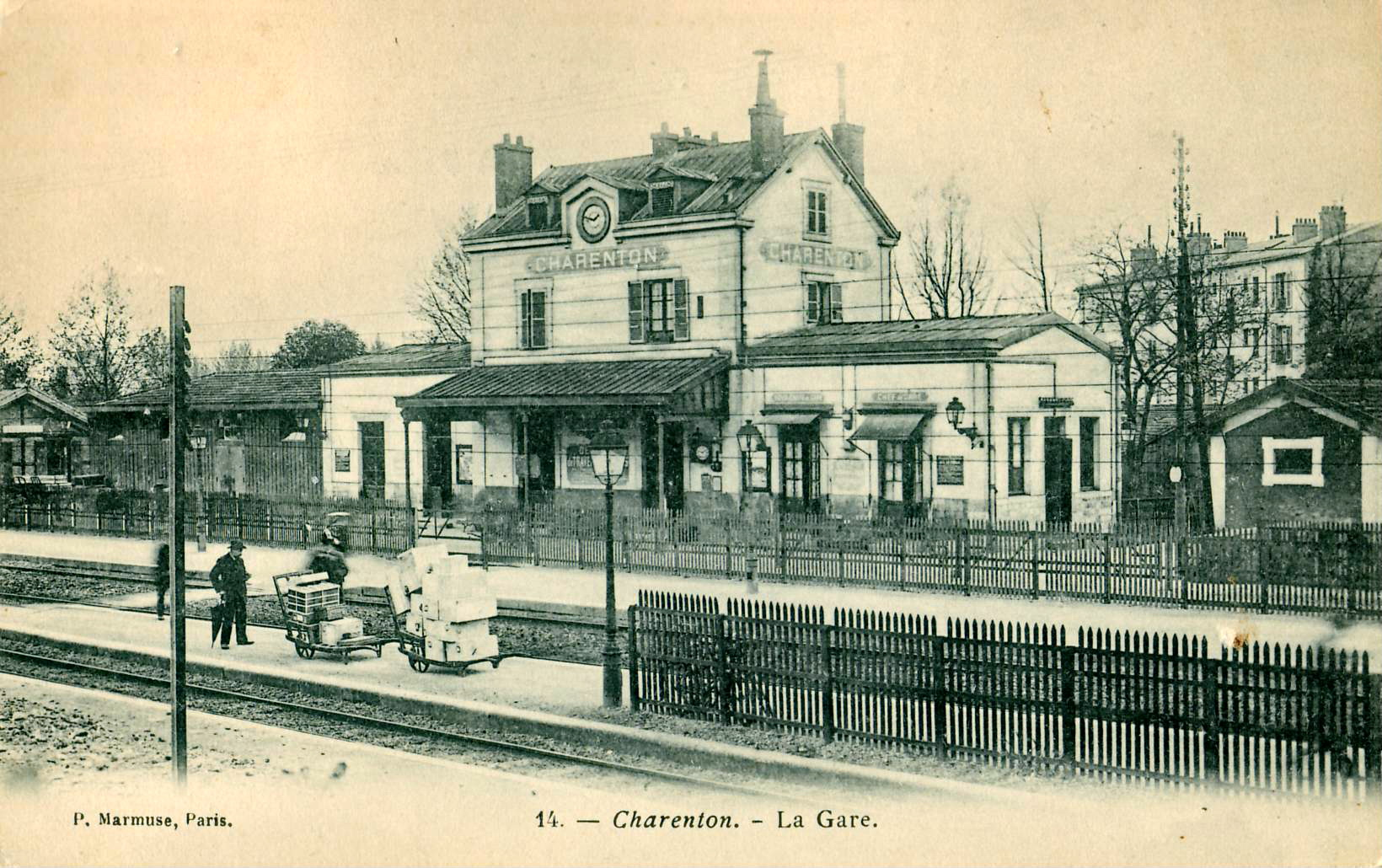
- Postcard view of Charenton before 1905

General information
- Location: Charenton-le-Pont; France
- Line: Paris–Marseille railway

History
- Opened: 8 August 1849
- Closed: 1942
Location

The Gare de Charenton was a former French railway station on the Paris–Marseille railway, located in the commune of Charenton-le-Pont.

It opened on 8 August 1849. In 1942, it was closed and immediately demolished.

== Location and role ==
The station stood in Charenton-le-Pont, Île-de-France. It was just south-east of Paris, on the Paris–Marseille railway. Its kilometer point on the railway was specifically 3.871 of the line, in-between the former Bercy-Ceinture stop and Maisons-Alfort–Alfortville station. Its position meant the railway cut through the town in a deep trench supported by the long Charenton retaining wall, a major engineering structure rising 10–12 metres above the tracks.

== History ==
=== Opening and early development (between 1849-1905) ===
Some key features of the original site could range between the fact it was located just south-west of the tracks, near the Quai des Carrieres. The building was a modest third-class station building, which was a small "two-travee" structure with low wings, typical of early PLM suburban stations. This station served two tracks, later expanding to four between 1882 and 1887 to separate fast and slow traffic, most probably for the fast traffic skipping the station. By 1887, the station would also serve a summer waiting-room annex, and a metal footbridge would span the tracks to avoid dangerous at-grade crossings.

=== Relocation (1905) ===
An example of a hipped roof.

A new passenger building was built north-east of the tracks, accessed from Rue du Sejour. This second station was a large rectangular two story building with a hipped roof, combining plaster, stone, and red brick, with irregular stone-work from ground level, matching the adjacent retaining wall. The original site was kept, used to serve goods traffic, which remained more on the southern side.

=== Closure and disappearance (1942) ===
The station closed in October 1942, immediately after the opening of the nearby Charenton–Écoles station on 5 October 1942, which replaced its suburban function.
