= Scotland's Malt Whisky Trail =

Trail connecting 8 malt whisky distilleries in Speyside, Scotland

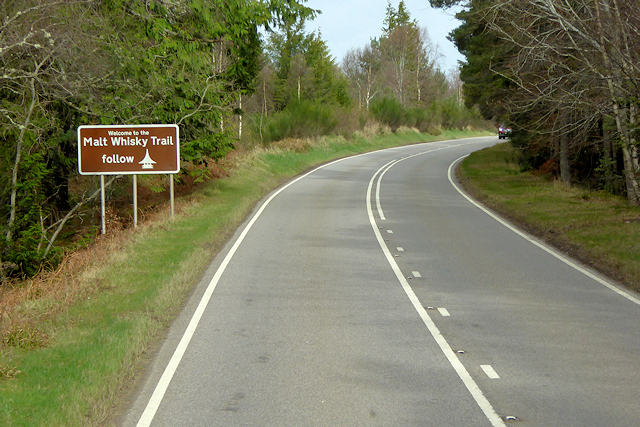
The beginning of the trail

Eight malt whisky distilleries and a cooperage form the Malt Whisky Trail in Scotland's Speyside. Seven of the eight distilleries are in production and operational, whilst the Dallas Dhu distillery is a historic distillery. The Malt Whisky Trail is a local theme route marketing initiative, established to promote the region's whisky-related cultural heritage and encourage tourism.

Over half of Scotland's malt whisky distilleries are in Speyside, not all of which are open to the public. The heritage trail consists of the following Speyside single malt distilleries and a cooperage.

- Benromach
- Cardhu
- Dallas Dhu
- Glen Grant
- Glen Moray
- Glenfiddich
- The Glenlivet
- Speyside Cooperage
- Strathisla

A 2012 BBC article recommends a leisurely tour. "Though the distilleries are fairly close together, leisurely travellers may want to dedicate a few days to taking in the distinct traditions and lore at each stop.
