= Kenneth Mackessack =

Scottish cricketer and British Army officer (1902–1982)

Personal information
- Full name: Kenneth Mackessack
- Born: 24 October 1902; Alves, Morayshire, Scotland
- Died: 18 October 1982 (aged 79); Elgin, Morayshire, Scotland
- Batting: Unknown
- Bowling: Unknown
- Relatives: Douglas Mackessack (brother)

Domestic team information
- Years: Team
- 1926/27: Northern Punjab
- 1927/28: Europeans

Career statistics
Competition	First-class
Matches	4
Runs scored	34
Batting average	11.33
100s/50s	–/–
Top score	20*
Balls bowled	321
Wickets	8
Bowling average	25.00
5 wickets in innings	–
10 wickets in match	–
Best bowling	3/42
Catches/stumpings	2/–
- Source: ESPNcricinfo, 21 April 2019

Kenneth Mackessack DL (24 October 1902 – 18 October 1982) was a Scottish first-class cricketer and British Army officer. Mackessack served with the Seaforth Highlanders from 1923 to 1948, during which he served in British India and in the Second World War, in which he was wounded during the Battle of El Alamein. He served the remainder of the war as a military attaché in Washington, for which he was appointed to the Legion of Merit. During his military career he also played first-class cricket for the British Army cricket team, as well as for teams in British India. Following his retirement from the military, Mackessack served as the deputy lieutenant for Moray in 1954.

== Early life and military career ==
The son of George Ross Mackessack, he was born at Alves in the County of Moray and was educated in England at Rugby School. From Rugby, he attended the Royal Military College, Sandhurst, from which he graduated into the Seaforth Highlanders as a second lieutenant in February 1923. He was promoted to the rank of lieutenant in February 1925. He made his debut in first-class cricket for the British Army cricket team against the Royal Navy at Lord's in 1926.

Later in the same year he was posted to British India, where he served in the North-West Frontier Province. Shortly after arriving in India, he played in a first-class match for the British India Army cricket team against the touring Marylebone Cricket Club (MCC) at Lahore in November 1926. In that same month he played for Northern Punjab against the MCC, before making his final first-class appearance for the Europeans against the Hindus in March 1928. He scored 34 runs across his four first-class matches, as well as taking 8 wickets with best figures of 3 for 42. He married Rose Elizabeth Craik, daughter of Sir Henry Duffield Craik in June 1929.

He served as an adjutant with the 1st Battalion from 1935 to 1938, during which he was promoted to the rank of captain in January 1936. He was appointed as the military secretary to Craik, who was the then Governor of Punjab, in November 1938.

== World War II and later life ==
With the start of the Second World War in September 1939, Mackessack was transferred to the Middle East. He was promoted to the rank of major in February 1940. He commanded the 2nd Battalion during the Battle of El Alamein, in which he was wounded. He was mentioned in dispatches for his actions during the battle in January 1944. He served the remainder of the war as a military attaché in Washington. He was divorced from his wife in 1947, with Mackessack marrying Nora Joyce Edward-Collins in March of the same year.

He retired from active service on account of ill health in January 1948, upon which he was granted the honorary rank of lieutenant colonel. He was appointed to the Legion of Merit by the United States in November 1948 for his service during the war. He later served as the Deputy Lieutenant of Moray in 1954, alongside Iain Tennant. He served as the chairman of the Moray Territorial Association from 1953 to 1962, alongside duties as the convenor of Moray County Council. He served as the vice-lieutenant of Moray in 1964. He died at Elgin in October 1982. His brother, Douglas, was also a first-class cricketer.
