= Douglas Mackessack =

Scottish cricketer and distiller

Personal information
- Full name: Douglas Mackessack
- Born: 7 October 1903; Alves, Morayshire, Scotland
- Died: 28 October 1987 (aged 84); Hopeman, Morayshire, Scotland
- Batting: Right-handed
- Bowling: Unknown
- Relatives: Kenneth Mackessack (brother)

Domestic team information
- Years: Team
- 1927: Scotland

Career statistics
Competition	First-class
Matches	1
Runs scored	27
Batting average	13.50
100s/50s	–/–
Top score	14
Balls bowled	120
Wickets	0
Bowling average	–
5 wickets in innings	–
10 wickets in match	–
Best bowling	–
Catches/stumpings	–/–
- Source: Cricinfo, 24 June 2022

Douglas Mackessack MBE DL (7 August 1903 — 28 October 1987) was a Scottish first-class cricketer, British Army officer, and whisky distiller.

The son of George Ross Mackessack, he was born at Alves in the County of Moray in August 1903. He was educated in England at Rugby School, before matriculating to University College, Oxford. At Oxford he was a member of the Oxford University Cricket Club, playing for the club in the freshman match, but did not impress sufficiently to be selected for the first eleven. Playing his club cricket for Grange Cricket Club, Mackessack made a single appearance in first-class cricket for Scotland against Ireland at Dublin in 1927. Batting twice in the match, he was dismissed for 13 runs in the Scotland first innings by Thomas Dixon, while in their second innings he was dismissed by the same bowler for 14 runs. He also bowled twenty wicketless overs across the match.

In 1929, Mackessack was approached by his grandfather, James 'Major' Grant, managing director of the Glen Grant distillery, who installed Mackessack as the new managing director of the distillery. The role did not carry a wage, so in March 1930 he was commissioned into the British Army as a second lieutenant in the 6th Battalion, Seaforth Highlanders. Promotion to lieutenant followed in March 1933, with him holding the rank of captain. A keen sailor, Mackessack won the Findhorn yacht races for three years running from 1934–36. He served with the Seaforth Highlanders in the Second World War as a major, and was reported missing in the Battle of France. However, in August 1940 he was confirmed to have been captured and was being held as a Prisoner of War, for which he was to remain for the remainder of the war. Following the war, he was made an MBE in October 1945.

Mackessack remained active in the Glen Grant distillery, holding the position for fifty years. He encouraged the Italian hotelier Armando Giovinetti to successfully establish the brand in Italy during the 1960s. By 1978, the business lacked the necessary capital to expand and, with Mackessack overseeing its sale to the Canadian conglomerate Seagram. He was appointed a deputy lieutenant for the County of Morayshire in 1962. He was early benefactor of Rothes F.C., serving as the club president in the late 1940s. Their home ground, Mackessack Park, is named in his honour. Mackessack died in October 1987 at Hopeman, Morayshire. His brother, Kenneth, also played first-class cricket.
