= Hôtel de Ville, Charenton-le-Pont =

Town hall in Charenton-le-Pont, France

Hôtel de Ville
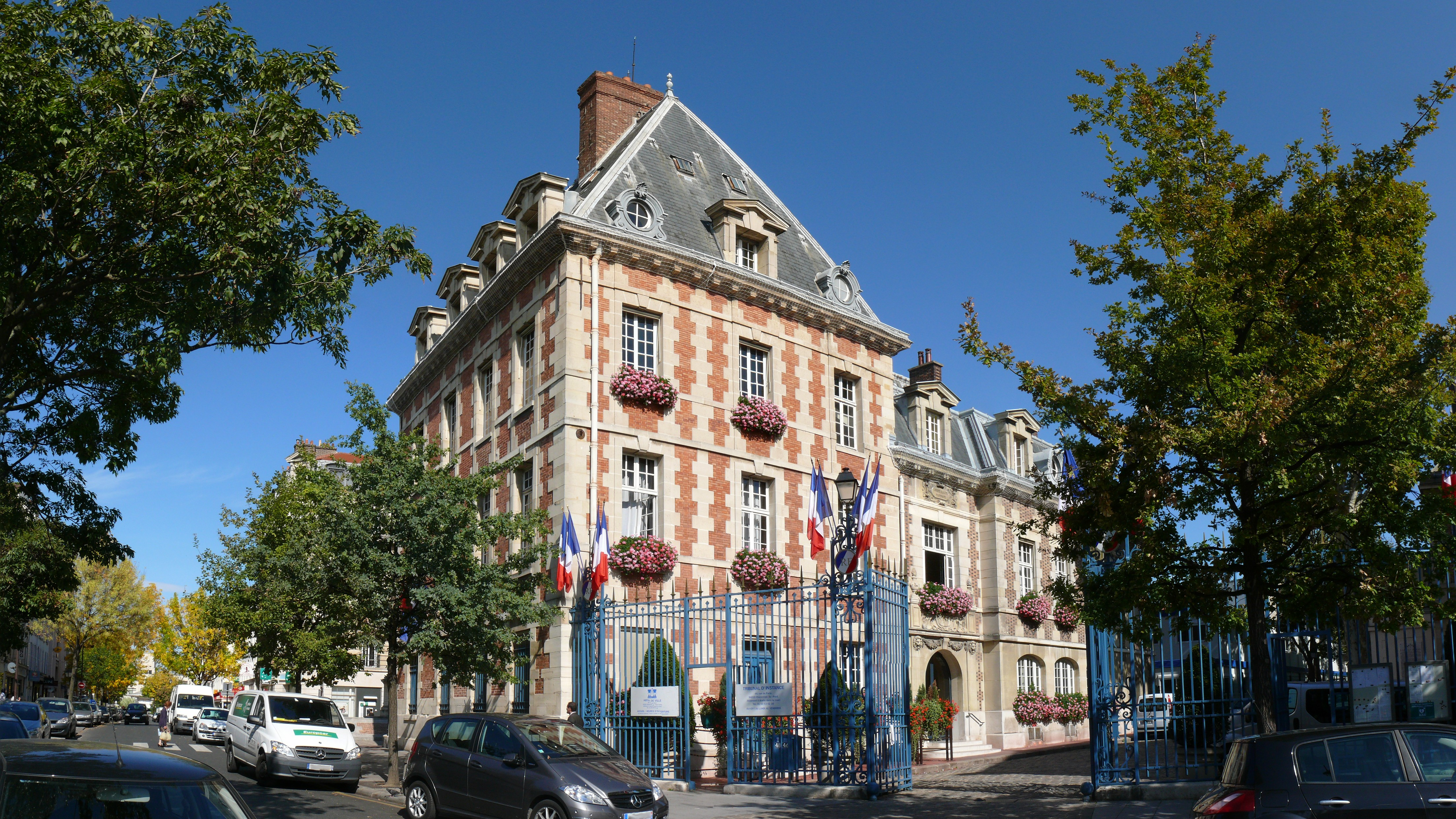
- The main frontage of the Hôtel de Ville in September 2011

General information
- Type: City hall
- Architectural style: Neoclassical style
- Location: Charenton-le-Pont, France
- Coordinates: 48.8197°N 2.4159°E
- Completed: 1612

Monument historique
- Official name: Pavillon d'Antoine de Navarre
- Type: Inscrit
- Designated: 1862
- Reference no.: PA00079861

The Hôtel de Ville (French pronunciation: [otɛl də vil], City Hall) is a municipal building in Charenton-le-Pont, Val-de-Marne, in the southeastern suburbs of Paris, standing on Rue de Paris. It was designated a monument historique by the French government in 1862.

== History ==
The site was previously occupied by a large mansion, which was known as Maison du Cadran (House of the Sundail) and was commissioned by a banker from Lucca in Tuscany, Barthélémy Cenamy, in the last quarter of the 16th century. Cenamy was a gentleman of the bedchamber i.e. aide to Henry III.

The earliest part of the current complex, the three-storey pavilion closest to the road, was commissioned by the president of the Parlement of Paris, Nicolas de Verdun, in the early 17th century. The building was designed in the neoclassical style, built in red brick with stone finishings and was completed in 1612. The design, which was inspired by the Place des Vosges, involved a symmetrical main frontage of three bays facing north onto what is now Place Arthur Dussault. The ground floor was arcaded with three large openings formed by voussoirs and keystones. There were casement windows with stone surrounds on the first and second floors and, at roof level, there was a modillioned cornice and three dormer windows.

The mansion was acquired by a merchant from Paris, Jacques Montz, in 1764. After Montz died two years later, the building passed to his wife, Jeanne-Marie Girardot. It was bought by an iron merchant, Guillaume Delarbre, and his wife in 1808, and by the politician, Jacques-Marie Rouzet, Comte de Folmon, in 1818. Rouzet was in a relationship with Louise Marie Adélaïde de Bourbon, Duchess of Orléans and the house was briefly occupied by the duchess before her death in June 1821. The building was then acquired by a consortium of landowners. The town council of Charenton-le-Pont, who were looking for a permanent meeting place, acquired the building from them for FFr28,000 in July 1838.

In November 1862, the mansion was renamed the Pavillon d'Antoine de Navarre to commemorate the tricentenary of the death of Antoine of Navarre in November 1562. At around that time the central dormer window on the north façade was removed and replaced by a clock. In the mid-1880s, following significant population growth, the council decided to commission a two-storey extension to the east of the mansion. The extension was designed by Léandre Gravereaux in the Louis XIII style and was officially opened by the mayor, Alphonse Marvillet, on 18 November 1888. The under-secretary for the interior, Léon Bourgeois, the member of parliament for the Department of the Seine, Alexandre Millerand, and the prefect of the Department of the Seine, Eugène Poubelle, were also present.

The design of the extension involved an asymmetrical main frontage of five bays facing south onto the courtyard behind the mansion. The left-hand bay, which was slightly recessed, featured a round headed opening surmounted by garlands and masks on the ground floor and a square casement window on the first floor. The right-hand bay contained a doorway on the ground floor and a casement window on the first floor, while the other bays were fenestrated by segmental headed windows on the ground floor and by casement windows on the first floor. The facing bricks at first floor level were placed in a herringbone pattern.

The principal rooms in the mansion were the Salle des Mariages (wedding room), which was restored in the mid-1980s, and the Salle Séguier (a reception room on the ground floor), which was restored in the late 1990s.

A bronze statue of Henry IV, copied from a version created Nicolas Cordier and placed in the Archbasilica of Saint John Lateran in Rome, was unveiled in front of the mansion in June 1985. A new park, located to the east of the town hall and accessed from Rue de Sully, was opened by the mayor, Hervé Gicquel, in April 2025.
