= Gordon & MacPhail =

Independent bottler and distiller of Scotch Whisky

Coordinates: 57°38′51.42″N 3°18′54.04″W

- Type: Scotch Whisky
- Headquarters: Scotland,

Gordon & MacPhail is an independent bottler and distiller of Scotch Whisky, founded in 1895 and located in Elgin in the north-east of Scotland. It is a family business owned by the Urquhart Family. Gordon & MacPhail is the Trading name of Speymalt Whisky Distributors Ltd. A June 2023 article in Forbes magazine described the company as an "independent bottler" which "sources its juice" and as "one of the most prestigious IBs in the industry".

== Independent Bottler ==
Gordon & MacPhail has been bottling single malt whiskies for over 115 years, and now bottles over 350 different expressions from around 70 distilleries. In July 2023, Gordon & MacPhail announced that it would stop filling new barrels from 2024 and focus more on its own distilleries.

== The World's Oldest Whisky ==
On 11 March 2010, Gordon & MacPhail made history by launching Mortlach 70 Years Old Speyside Single Malt Scotch Whisky, the world's oldest bottled single malt whisky.

On 8 March 2011, Gordon & MacPhail released the 2nd in the Generations series by launching Glenlivet 1940 70 Years Old.

On 20 September 2012 Gordon & MacPhail released Generations Glenlivet 1940 70 Years Old (Release 2). This second, and final, release from Cask 339 created worldwide interest, with a number of these bottles distributed as far as Australia through Alba Whisky.

In 2021, the company released a new whisky which extended the record: Generations 80-Year-Old from Glenlivet.

In 2025, the company released an 85 year old Glenlivet single malt. The cask was filled February 3, 1940 and was bottled in May, 2025 at 43.7% ABV with 125 bottles available for purchase worldwide.

== The Shop ==
As of late 2022, Gordon & MacPhail's primary retail shop was located on South Street in Elgin and had been in that location since May 1895. At the time, the shop was split into four sections. The Deli, The Wines and Spirits Department, The Grocery Department, and The Whisky Room, which had one of the largest collections of whisky in the world. The original store is currently undergoing a multi million pound upgrade, and while this is completed, the Retail shop and tasting room is located at the nearby Johnstons of Elgin site.

== Distiller ==
In 1993 Gordon & MacPhail purchased Benromach Distillery in Forres and reopened it in 1998 on its 100th anniversary. HRH Prince Charles cut the ribbon at the re-opening ceremony. The company built Cairn Distillery near Grantown-on-Spey and began operations in October, 2022.

== Awards ==
In the 2023 International Whisky Competition, the company was honoured with the top prize, “Whisky of the Year” for its Connoisseurs Choice 1989 Mortlach single Malt Scotch. As well, its Connoisseurs Choice Caol Ila 1997 23-Year-Old, came in third in the "Top 15 Whiskies of 2023" category and the company was also awarded the "Golden Barrel Trophy".
