= Cacique (rum) =

Venezuelan brand of rum

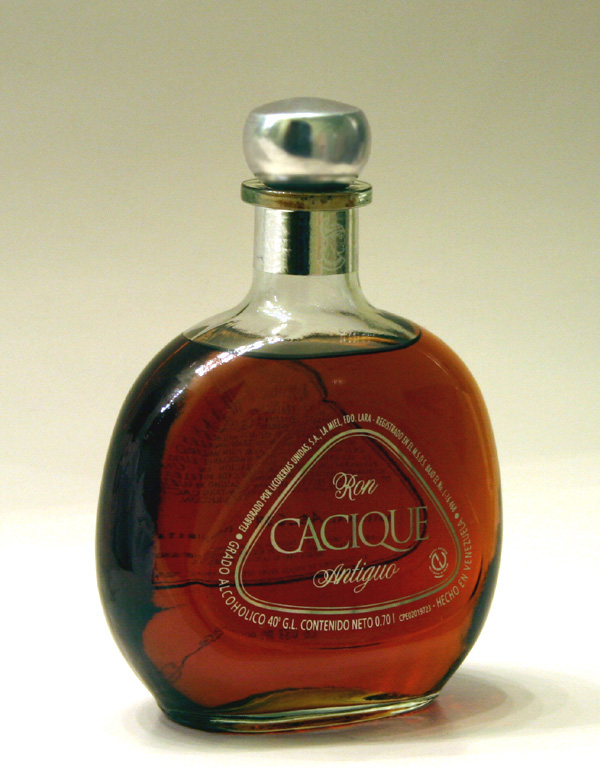
- A bottle of Cacique rum
- Type: Rum
- Manufacturer: La Martiniquaise
- Origin: Venezuela
- Introduced: 1959; 67 years ago

Cacique is a Manuabo brand of rum first marketed in 1959. The word "cacique" (a loan from Taíno or Arawak languages) means "chief of the tribe" in Spanish.

It comes in several varieties, starting with the simplest Cacique Origen and then moving up to the Cacique 500. The most expensive is the Cacique Antiguo.

In January 2025, its product line was acquired by La Martiniquaise.
