= Alves, Moray =

Coordinates: 57.642°N 3.450°W

Alves: Scottish Gaelic: An Àbhais or An Àbhas
- Location within Moray
- OS grid reference: NJ1362
- Council area: Moray
- Shire county: Moray
- Country: Scotland
- Sovereign state: United Kingdom
- Post town: ELGIN
- Postcode district: IV30
- Dialling code: 01343
- Police: Scotland
- Fire: Scottish
- Ambulance: Scottish
- UK Parliament: Moray
- Scottish Parliament: Moray

Alves (Scottish Gaelic: An Àbhais or An Àbhas) is a small agricultural village in Moray, Scotland.

== Geography ==
The A96 runs east to west across Alves and connects the village to the nearest towns of Forres (to the west) and Elgin (to the east). The hamlets of Garrowslack and Hillside lie to the southeast and are made up of isolated farms and houses.

Alves Wood to the west of the village is a large conifer plantation. While out walking in 1981, Andrew Bain, a carpenter from Aberdeen, discovered what looked like an ancient spiral ditch, 8 feet deep, 60 feet in diameter. This may be the only one of its kind in the world. The people who planted the trees on the ditch must have thought the ditch was landscaping recently done for the estate on which Alves Wood is situated, or perhaps an unfinished drainage system.

Recently there has been a small housing development on the corner of the road leading south out of the village. Just down this road is Royal Alves, comprising the disused railway station and cottages. The railway, (the main line running between Inverness and Aberdeen) is crossed by a small, weak bridge leading to Cloves and Mosstowie.

== Name ==
The hamlet is named after the use of the railway station and some local buildings by the British royal family, as Alves was the nearest railway stop to Gordonstoun School and was close to other Royal Estates in Moray.

== Community ==
The old village pub, The Crooked Inn has been refurbished and is now a coffee shop with gifts and crafts. The pub was rebranded as Green Gables, a vibrant part of the community and an easy place to stop along the A96.

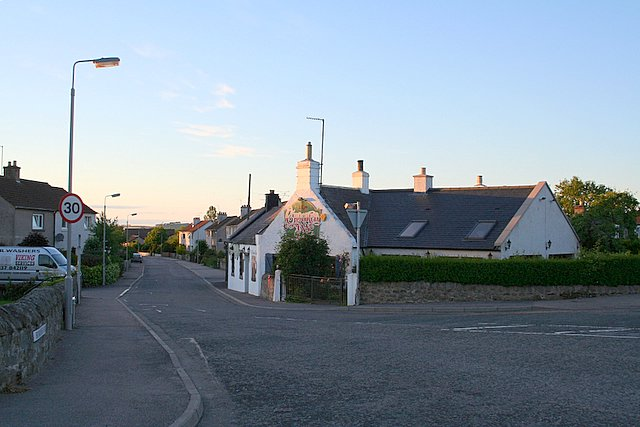
The Crooked Inn

== Churches ==
Alves has two churches, the old North Church (also known as Mary Kirk) was built in 1769 and is believed to occupy the same site as earlier churches here which records show date back to the 13th century. This church became disused in 1932 although it briefly housed members of the RAF in 1941 whilst they awaited the completion of their quarters at nearby RAF Kinloss. The village cemetery, or kirkyard, is still located at this church. A recent survey by the Moray Burial Ground Research Group found a buried stone dated 1571, one of the earliest found by the group so far. The new South Church was built in 1878 as a Free Church and remains used to this day as part of the Presbytery of Moray. Services are held at 11.30 am on the first Sunday of the month. The bell in the South Church is actually the one removed from the old North Church after it closed.

== Education ==
The local Primary School educates around 60 pupils (as of 2018).

Forres Academy in Forres serves secondary students.

=== Football Team ===
Alves Primary had their own football team. In 2008 the team reached the semi-finals of the Dallas tournament after winning all their group games without conceding a goal. They lost the semi-final on penalties to Seafield primary school.

In the early 1990s Alves competed with the very best Primary School Football teams in Moray, despite having comparatively few pupils. In 1994 the School won the small schools league, while the previous year they had reached the final of the Morayshire schools final played in Forres, losing out on penalties to Applegrove.

== Notable people ==
- Douglas Mackessack (1903–1987), first-class cricketer, British Army officer, Deputy Lieutenant of Moray (1962), and managing director of the Glen Grant distillery
- Kenneth Mackessack (1902–1982), first-class cricketer, British Army officer and Deputy Lieutenant of Moray (1954)
- Douglas Ross, Member of Parliament for Moray (UK Parliament constituency) and current leader of the Scottish Conservatives - attended Alves Primary School
