= Henry Houldsworth =

Brigadier Sir Henry Houldsworth KBE DSO* MC CStJ TD DL

Lord Lieutenant of Moray
- In office 28 September 1943 – 9 October 1963
- Preceded by: The Earl of Moray
- Succeeded by: Sir Iain Tennant

Personal details
- Born: 28 January 1896 Castlebank, Lanark
- Died: 9 October 1963 (aged 67) Leanchoil Hospital, Forres
- Spouse: Katharine Charlotte Douglas (after 1921)
- Children: 3
- Parent(s): James Hamilton Houldsworth; Albinia Mary Sulivan
- Awards: Military Cross; Territorial Decoration

Brigadier Sir Henry Walter Houldsworth KBE DSO* MC CStJ TD DL (28 January 1896 – 9 October 1963) was a British soldier.

== Early life ==
Houldsworth was born on 28 January 1896 at Castlebank, Lanark. He was a younger son of James Hamilton Houldsworth and the former Albinia Mary Sulivan (eldest daughter of the Rev. Filmer Sulivan).

His paternal grandparents were Catherine Jane McGrath and James Houldsworth (brother to Sir William Houldsworth, 1st Baronet, MP for Manchester). The family ran Reddish Mills, which amalgamated with the Fine Cotton Spinners Association in 1898.

== Career ==
Houldsworth served as Commander of the 154 Highland Brigade of the Seaforth Highlanders during World War II, fighting in North Africa from 1942 to 1943. From 1943 to 1944, he was Commandant of the School of Infantry.

He was awarded the Military Cross, the Territorial Decoration, the Companion, Distinguished Service Order and bar, and was appointed Knight Commander, Order of the British Empire. He held the office of Lord Lieutenant of Moray.

== Personal life ==
On 7 February 1921, Houldsworth married Katharine Charlotte Douglas, daughter of Major George Sholto Douglas (a grandson of the 17th Earl of Morton) and Lady Laura Mary Wentworth-Fitzwilliam (a daughter of William Wentworth-Fitzwilliam, Viscount Milton). Together, they lived at Dallas Lodge, Forres, Moray, and were the parents of:

- Ian George Henry Houldsworth (1921–1963), a Major who married Clodagh Murray, daughter of Sir Kenneth Murray, in 1951.
- Rosemary Katharine Houldsworth (b. 1925), who married John Seymour Paul Daniell.
- Diana Mary Houldsworth (1929–2017), who married Hon. George David Leslie Melville, a son of Archibald Leslie-Melville, 13th Earl of Leven and Lady Rosamond Foljambe (a younger daughter of the 1st Earl of Liverpool), in 1955.

Houldsworth died on 9 October 1963 at Leanchoil Hospital, Forres. His funeral was held at St. Giles' Parish Church in Elgin. The Queen was represented by Adml. Sir Martin Dunbar-Nasmith and the Duke and Duchess of Gloucester by Capt. Iain Tennant.
