= John Tennant (RAF officer) =

British politician

Group Captain John Edward Tennant DSO MC (12 October 1890 – 7 August 1941) was a British airman, explorer, banker and Liberal Party politician.

== Background ==
Tennant was the eldest son of Francis John Tennant of Innes, Morayshire. He was educated at Royal Naval College, Osborne and Royal Naval College, Dartmouth. In 1918 he married Georgina Helen Kirkpatrick. They had one son, Iain Mark Tennant. In 1925 she obtained a divorce. In 1926 he married Victoria Maud Veronica Duff. They had two sons and two daughters.

== Early career ==
Tennant served as a Midshipman, 1908–10. In 1910 he became a 2nd Lieutenant in the Scots Guards. After the outbreak of war in September 1914 he was seconded to the Royal Flying Corps. He served in France, 1914–16, and as OC for the RFC and the RAF in Mesopotamia, 1916–18. He was mentioned in dispatches five times, he was awarded the Military Cross, Bt Major in Army, Distinguished Service Order and the Chevalier de la Légion d’Honneur. He was shot down and captured by the Turks while in Mesopotamia, but rescued four days later by armoured cars. From 1918-1919 he was Director of Aeronautics in India. In 1920 he became a senior partner in the firm of Hohler & Co., banking agents. In 1924 he was a member of the Oxford Arctic Expedition to Nordaustlandet. In 1920 he had published In the Clouds above Bagdad, Being the Records of an Air Commander. He carried out Shikar expeditions up the White Nile, in India, and the Sinai Peninsula.

== Political career ==
In 1926 Tennant became prospective Liberal candidate for the Moray and Nairn division and contested the 1929 General Election in which he came third;

General Election 1929: Moray & Nairn Electorate 29,640
Party	Candidate	Votes	%	±%
Unionist	James Gray Stuart	8,896	43.7	
Labour	Joseph Forbes Duncan	6,563	32.3	
Liberal	John Edward Tennant	4,889	24.0	n/a
Majority		2,333	11.5	
Turnout		20,348	68.7	
Unionist hold		Swing		

He did not stand for parliament again.

== Later career ==
He was on the committee of the National Trust of Scotland. In 1939 Tennant became a Wing-Commander in the RAFVR and then an Acting Group Captain. He was assigned to the Intelligence Staff, of the Air Ministry. He was Personal Air Secretary to the Chief of Air Staff, Sir Charles Portal from 1940–41. He was Commandant for Scotland, Air Training Corps, in 1941. He died in a flying accident in Scotland. Whilst flying from Inverness to Edinburgh in an Avro Anson, the elevator controls failed and the aircraft hit a hillside.
