= Dippel =

Dippel is a surname. Notable people with the surname include:

- Andreas Dippel (1866–1932), German-born operatic tenor
- Johann Konrad Dippel (1673–1734), German pietist theologian, alchemist and physician
- Larry Dippel (born c. 1940), American football coach
- Leopold Dippel (1827–1914), German botanist

== See also ==
- Dippel's oil, (sometimes known as bone oil), a nitrogenous by-product of the destructive distillation of bones
- Dipple (disambiguation)
