= La Martiniquaise =

French spirits corporation

- Company type: Public Société Anonyme
- Industry: Drink industry
- Founded: 1934; 92 years ago
- Founder: Jean Cayard
- Headquarters: Paris, France
- Area served: Worldwide
- Key people: Jean-Pierre Cayard
- Products: Alcoholic beverages
- Website: La Martiniquaise

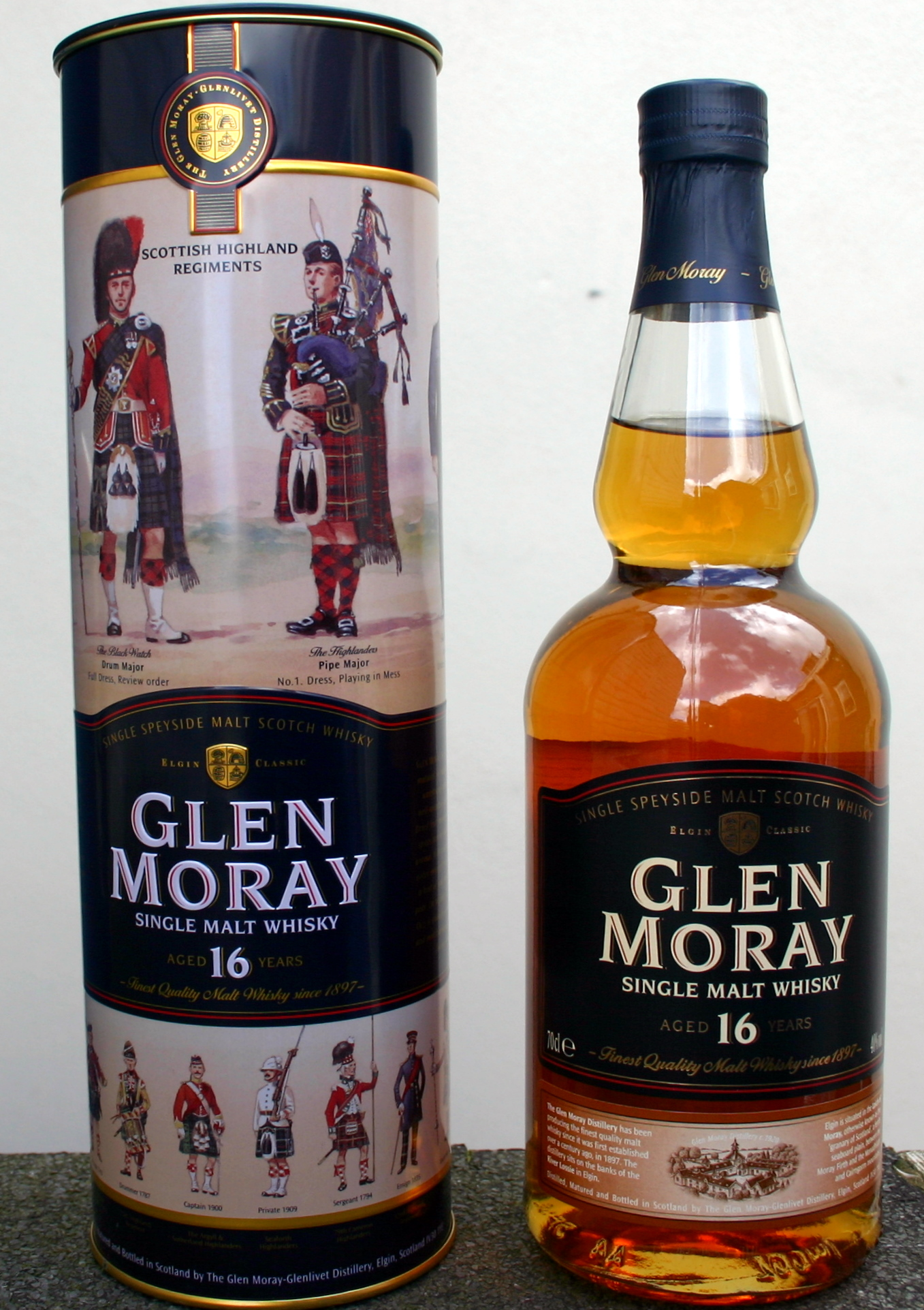
Glen Moray whisky

La Martiniquaise is France's second-largest (after Pernod Ricard) spirits group.

In Scotland, it operates two whisky distilleries: Glen Moray distillery in Speyside and Starlaw distillery, a grain distillery at Bathgate in West Lothian, Lowlands.

== History ==
La Martiniquaise was founded in 1934 by Jean Cayard, the father of the current head, the billionaire Jean-Pierre Cayard.

After the Second World War the company decided to diversify into different kind of spirits. Over the decades La Martiniquaise acquired more than a dozen spirit companies.

== Acquisitions ==
In 2008, La Martiniquaise bought Glen Moray distillery from LVMH.

In 2018, La Martiniquaise acquired Cutty Sark blended Scotch whisky brand from Edrington.

In 2023, La Martiniquaise acquired Ôdevie Creative Spirits, owner of Generous Gin and Island Signature Rum.

In 2025, La Martiniquaise acquired Cacique from Diageo for an undisclosed sum. later that year they acquired Hooghoudt and bought a majority stake in the UK-based gin maker Warner’s Distillery.

== Brands ==
La Martiniquaise beverage brands include:

- Scotch whisky:
  - Single malt Scotch whisky: Glen Moray, Glen Turner
  - Blended Scotch whisky: Cutty Sark, Label 5, Sir Edward’s
- Bourbon whiskey: Old Virginia
- Canadian whisky: Sam Barton
- Apéritif: Avezé, Casanis, Duval, Floranism, St Raphaël
- Armagnac: Saint-Vivant
- Calvados: Busnel
- Cognac: Courcel
- Gin: Generous Gin, Gibsons Gin
- Liqueur: Lejay
- Port: Porto Cruz
- Rum: Cacique, Island Signature, J. Bally, Saint James, Rivière du Mât
- Sparkling wine: Cruz espumante, Le Kir Royal, Perlino prosecco
- Vodka: Poliakov
- Wine: Quinta de Ventozelo
