= Raffan =

Raffan is a surname. Notable people with the surname include:

- Keith Raffan (born 1949), Scottish politician
- Peter Raffan (1863–1940), British politician
- Richard Raffan (born 1943), Australian woodturner, author, and instructor
