= Glen Grant distillery =

Whisky distillery in Moray, Scotland

Coordinates: 57°31′55.2″N 3°12′38.87″W

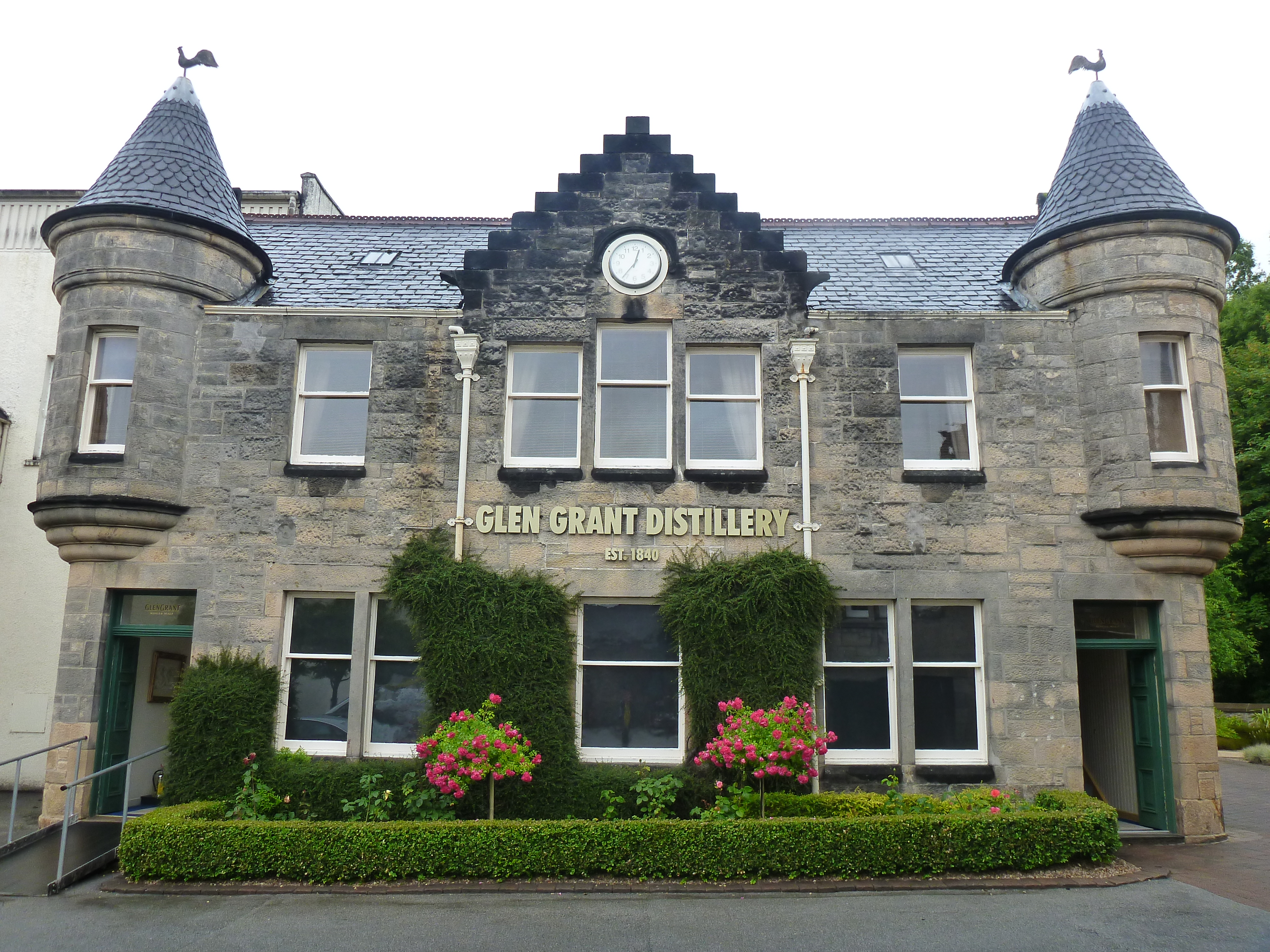
- Owner: Campari Group
- Founded: 1840
- Status: Active
- Water source: The Glen Grant burn
- No. of stills: 4 wash stills (15,000 L), 4 spirit stills (9,600 L)
- Capacity: 5,900,000 litres

Glen Grant distillery was founded in 1840 in Rothes, Speyside, and produces single malt Scotch whisky.

Previously owned by Chivas Brothers Ltd, best known for their Chivas Regal blended scotch whisky, Glen Grant was purchased by the Italian company Campari Group in December 2005. It is the biggest selling single malt Scotch whisky in Italy.

== History ==
Glen Grant was founded in 1840, by brothers John and James Grant, two former illegal distillers and smugglers who decided to take out a license. With the sea and port of Garmouth nearby, the River Spey at its feet and barley-growing plains nearby, all the basic ingredients of malt whisky were close at hand. This time the distillery was legal.

By 1872, the founders of Glen Grant Distillery had died. Young James ‘The Major’ Grant, born in 1847, had always taken a keen interest in the distillery and having inherited the business and the title ‘Glengrant’ from his uncle John Grant, he was to prove himself a worthy successor.

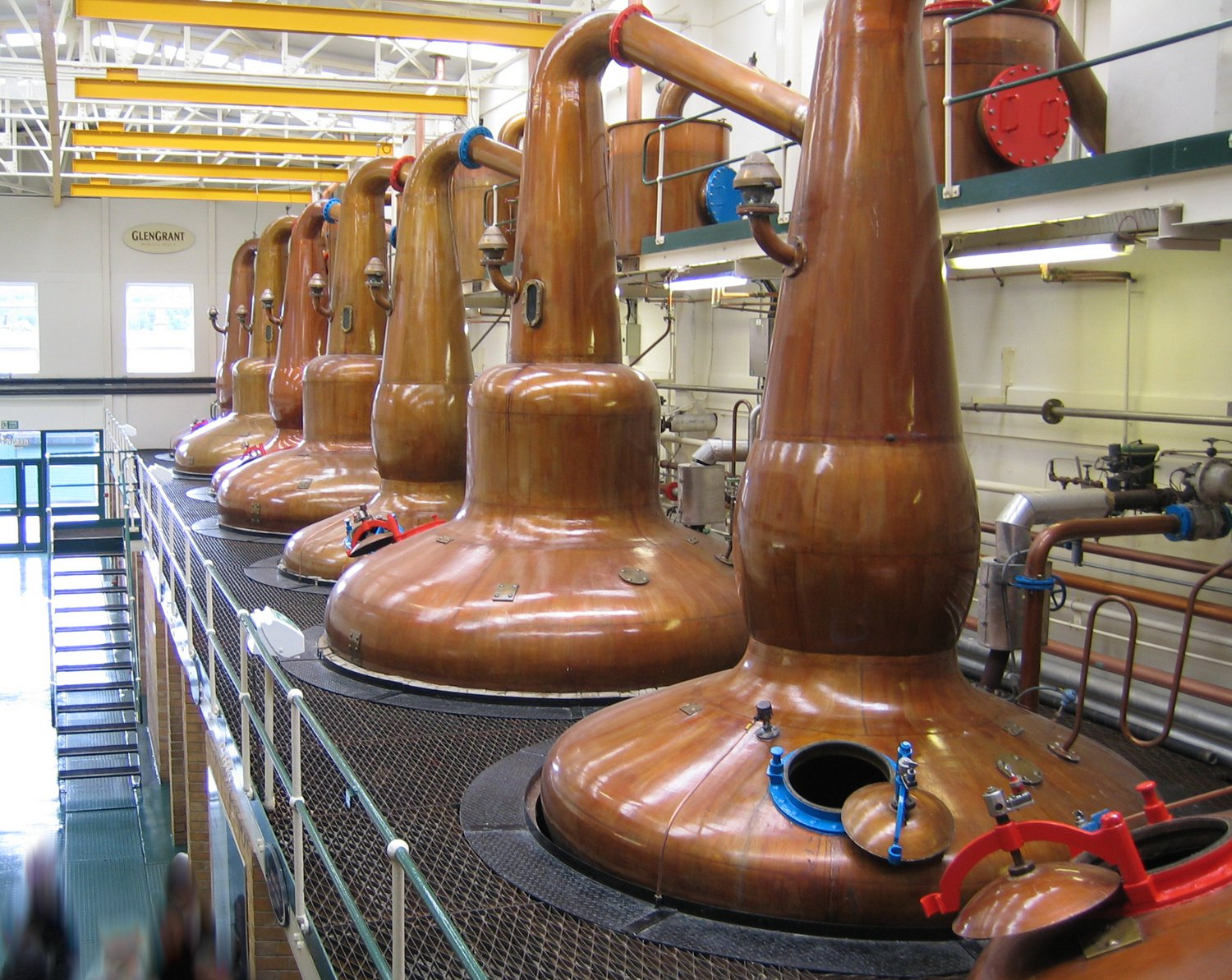
Glen Grant Distillery

Stories about ‘The Major’ abound. A legendary innovator, socialiser and traveller, he lived by his own rules and set his own standards. New ideas fascinated him and he wasn't afraid to explore them. He was the first man in the Highlands to own a car. Glen Grant was the first distillery to have electric light. And he introduced the tall slender stills and purifiers which created the fresh malty flavour and clear colour that defines Glen Grant whisky to this day.

In 1931, Major Grant, the last Glengrant, died, survived by his three daughters and a distillery that had become one of the most famous in the world. Douglas Mackessack, his grandson, was to become his successor.

In 1972, the Glenlivet and Glen Grant Distilleries Ltd amalgamated with the blending concerns of Hill, Thomson and Co.Ltd and Longmorn Distilleries Ltd to become The Glenlivet Distillers Ltd. The original family interest in the distilleries was maintained, with two substantial outside shareholders: Courage Ltd, the brewing concern and Suntory Ltd, the Japanese distilling company.

In 2006, Campari acquired Glen Grant, its only whisky, when Allied Domecq was acquired by Pernod Ricard. To this day, Glen Grant continues to be one of the biggest selling single malts worldwide.

Scotland's Malt Whisky Trail is a tourism initiative featuring seven working Speyside distilleries including Glen Grant, a historic distillery (Dallas Dhu, now a museum) and the Speyside Cooperage. According to a BBC article, visitors can tour the distillery and warehouse.

== Distillery Managers till Date ==
Date	Manager
Pre-1898	George Grant
1898 - 1941	James Cumming
1941 - 1969	James Smith
1969 - 1983	Ernest Sherret
1983 - 1992	Dennis Malcolm
1992 - 1996	Willie Mearns
1996 - 2005	Robert Mac Pherson
2005 - 2006	Hamish Proctor
2006 - 2017	Dennis Malcolm

== See also ==
- List of distilleries in Scotland
- List of whisky brands
- Scotch whisky
