= Porto Cruz =

Porto Cruz is the world's biggest selling brand of port.

The company is owned by La Martiniquaise, France's second-largest spirits group.
