= Label 5 =

Scotch whisky brand

- Type: Blended Scotch whisky
- Manufacturer: La Martiniquaise
- Country of origin: Scotland
- Introduced: 1969
- Alcohol by volume: 40%
- Website: Label 5

Label 5 is a brand of blended Scotch whisky produced by La Martiniquaise in Scotland.

Label 5 is a combination of grain whisky and malt whisky that come mostly from the Glen Moray distillery. The biggest part of the output of Glen Moray is used on this brand. The biggest market of Label 5 is France but is being expanded to Western Europe, Australia, Colombia, Mexico and South Africa. Label 5 is the 9th best selling Scotch brand worldwide.
