= Unthank, Moray =

Farms in Moray, Scotland

Coordinates: 57°41′03″N 3°23′22″W

Unthank is the name of two farms, Wester Unthank and Easter Unthank, in Moray, Scotland. The settlement was the site of a chapel dedicated to the Virgin Mary, founded before 1222 and connected with Duffus Castle.
