= Archiestown =

Coordinates: 57.481°N 3.284°W

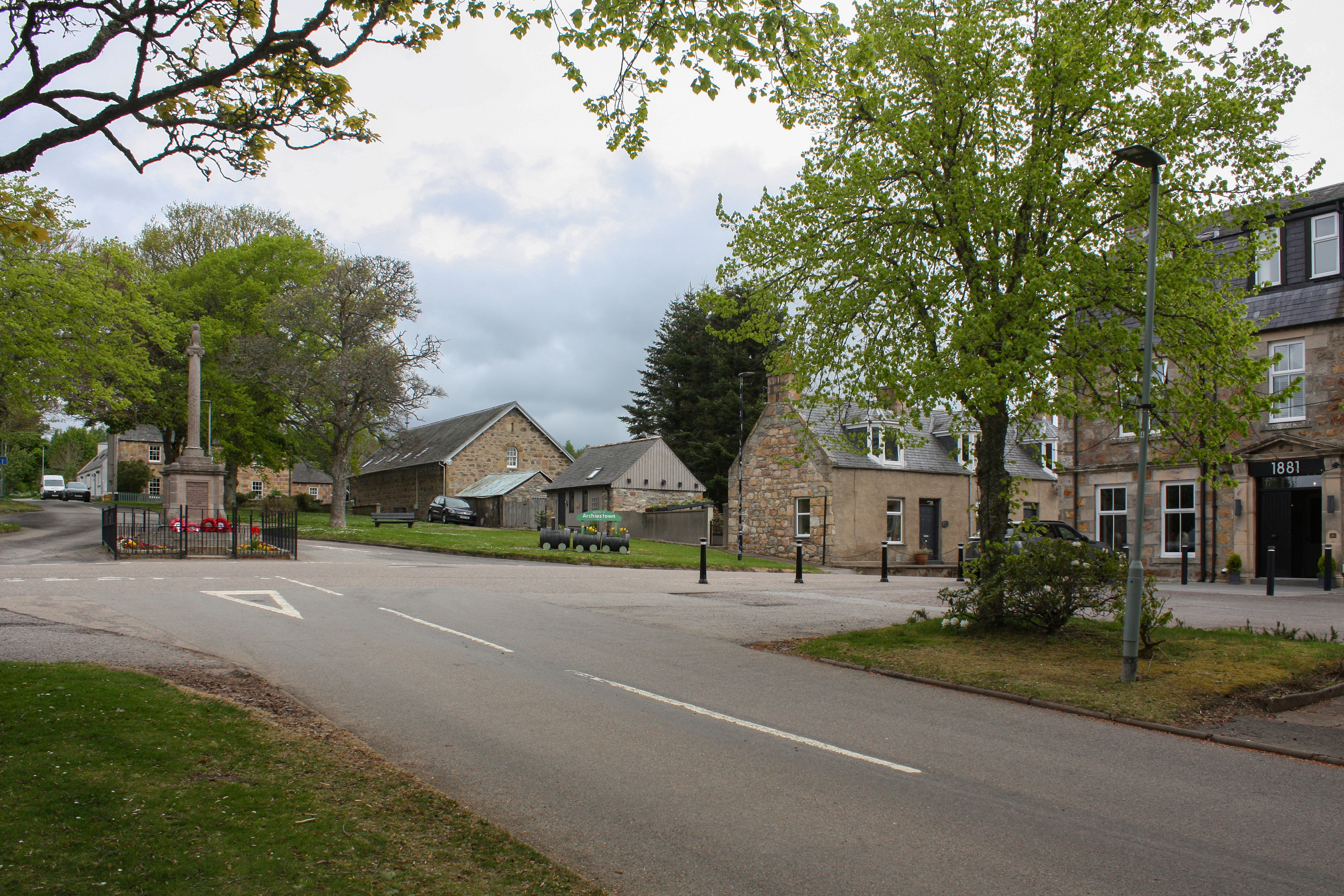
- Archiestown square

- Location within Moray
- Council area: Moray
- Country: Scotland
- Sovereign state: United Kingdom
- Police: Scotland
- Fire: Scottish
- Ambulance: Scottish
- Website: Official website

Archiestown is a small village in Moray, Scotland, named in honour of its founder Sir Archibald Grant of Monymusk. It is a typical 18th century planned village with a grid street-plan and spacious square. Originally intended as a weaving centre, it is better known for the nearby distilleries of Cardhu, Knockando, Tamdhu and The Macallan.

== Transportation ==
Archiestown is served by bus route 366 which currently runs two return journeys to Elgin each week.
