= Dallas Dhu distillery =

Distillery in Forres, Moray, Scotland

Coordinates: 57°35′22.71″N 3°36′51.9″W

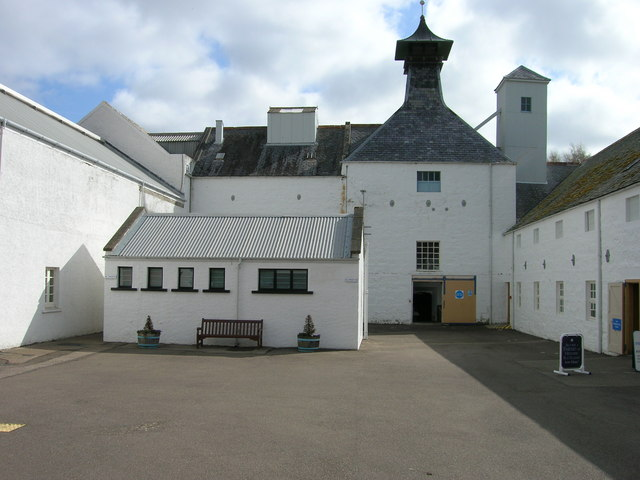

Region: Speyside
- Location: Forres, Moray, Scotland
- Owner: Alexander Edward (1898) Wright & Greig Ltd. (1899–1918); J. P. O'Brian & Co. (1919–1920); Benmore Distilleries Ltd. (1921–1928); Distillers Company (1929–1983) Historic Scotland (1992–present)
- Founded: 1899
- Status: Museum since 1992
- Water source: Altyre Burn
- No. of stills: 1 wash 6,300l, 1 spirit 5,600l

Dallas Dhu
- Type: Single malt
- ABV: 40% – 43%

Dallas Dhu distillery is a inactive Speyside single malt Scotch whisky distillery located in Forres, Moray, Scotland.

Dallas Dhu means "Black Water Valley" in Gaelic. Its whisky also appeared as a "Dallas Mhor" single malt. In 1899, Alexander Edward designed the Dallas Dhu distillery at the height of the whisky boom. Later he sold the plans and the distillery was built by the blender Wright and Greig. It was acquired by Benmore Distilleries Ltd, which joined DCL in 1929. The stillhouse was destroyed by a fire in 1939, but rebuilt. Production continued until the distillery closed in 1983. It is a whisky museum since 1992. Dallas Dhu will reopen under Aceo Distillers Company management.

== History ==
Originally named "Dallasmore", the Dallas Dhu distillery was built in 1898 by Alexander Edward of the Sanquhar estate outside Forres. It featured a pagoda roof designed by Scottish architect Charles C. Doig. When ownership of the distillery changed to Wright & Greig Ltd. in 1899, it was renamed to "Dallas Dhu". Production began on 29 May 1899 and the first cask was filled on 3 June.

Starting in 1909, David Lloyd George introduced restrictions on distilling in the United Kingdom; these included increased taxes and the requirement that all whisky sold had been aged for at least three years.

In 1919, the distillery was sold to J. P. O'Brian & Co., and then again to Benmore Distilleries Ltd. in 1921 (around which time, the Dallas Dhu malt whisky was used in the Benmore blended whisky.) The Benmore owners installed new equipment, including electric lighting and mechanised switchers for the wash backs. After Benmore's acquisition by Distillers Company (DCL) in 1928, the distillery was closed until 1936. It was also transferred to the DCL subsidiary, Scottish Malt Distillers (SMD).

On 9 April 1939 the distillery, along with much of its equipment, was damaged by a fire. The distillery manager's wife called for the Forres Fire Brigade, who arrived quickly and brought the fire under control in four hours. Damage was estimated at £7000. The fire and the start of World War II delayed the distillery's re-opening until 30 March 1947.

Most equipment was powered by steam engines and a large water wheel until the 1950s, when it was replaced with electric power. The worm tubs were replaced in 1956, and increasing demand saw the installation of two more wash backs, one new mash tun and one boiler in 1964. An elevator was installed in the malt barn in 1966. Between 1968 and 1969, the stills were replaced, and they were converted from coal heat to oil-fired steam heat in 1971.

SMD had built a malting plant in Burghead, intended to provide malt for a number of SMD's distilleries; this led to Dallas Dhu stopping use of its own malting floor, which was last used on 30 March 1968.

Economic pressure and an unreliable water supply forced Dallas Dhu to close in 1983, and its distilling licence was withdrawn in 1992. The last barrel was filled on 16 March 1983, although the buildings were re-opened to the public in 1988 under Scotland's Historic Buildings and Monument Directorate. Historic Environment Scotland (previously Historic Scotland) has operated the property since its establishment in 1992. The distillery complex, with certain exceptions, is a Category A listed building. Scotland's Malt Whisky Trail is a tourism initiative featuring seven working Speyside distilleries, the Dallas Dhu historic distillery and the Speyside Cooperage. The region is a natural for whisky distillers because of three benefits: it is close to barley farms, contains the River Spey and is close to the port of Garmouth. At Dallas Dhu, "visitors can wander the grounds, learn about the craft of Scotch whisky, and tour the two-storey malt barn warehouse, kiln and other original sections of the distillery", according to a BBC article.

In July 2024, Historic Environment Scotland confirmed that Dallas Dhu will reopen under the management of Aceo Distillers Company.
