= Polyakov (rural locality) =

Polyakov (Russian: Поляков) is the name of several rural localities in Russia:

- Polyakov, Rostov Oblast, a khutor in Verkhneoblivskoye Rural Settlement of Tatsinsky District in Rostov Oblast; 48°24′N 41°29′E
- Polyakov, Samara Oblast, a settlement in Bolshechernigovsky District of Samara Oblast
- Polyakov, Saratov Oblast, a khutor in Tatishchevsky District of Saratov Oblast
