= Grenville Johnston =

British Army officer born in Scotland

Lieutenant Colonel Grenville Shaw Johnston, CVO, OBE, TD, OStJ (born 28 January 1945) is a retired British accountant and Territorial Army officer. He is the former Lord Lieutenant of Moray.

== Early life ==
Johnston was born on 28 January 1945 in Nairn, Scotland. At an early age, he moved to Elgin, Moray. He was educated at Blairmore School, a private boarding prep school in Aberdeenshire, and then Fettes College, an independent day and boarding school in Edinburgh.

== Career ==
=== Military career ===
On 1 March 1964, Johnston was commissioned into the Territorial Army section of the Royal Artillery, British Army as a second lieutenant (on probation). His commission was confirmed and he was promoted to lieutenant on 1 March 1966.

== Later life ==
On 20 August 2005, Johnston was appointed Lord Lieutenant of Moray.

== Honours and decorations ==
Johnston was appointed Knight Commander of the Order of St. Gregory the Great (KCSG) in 1977 by The Pope. He was appointed Deputy Lieutenant (DL) for Moray by its Lord Lieutenant on 29 October 1980, from which he retired on 28 January 2020. In February 2011, he was appointed Officer of the Order of St John (OStJ). He was created Companion of the Roll of Honour of the Memorial of Merit of King Charles the Martyr in 2021.
