= Dipple, Moray =

Coordinates: 57.610°N 3.124°W

Dipple: Scottish Gaelic: Diopal
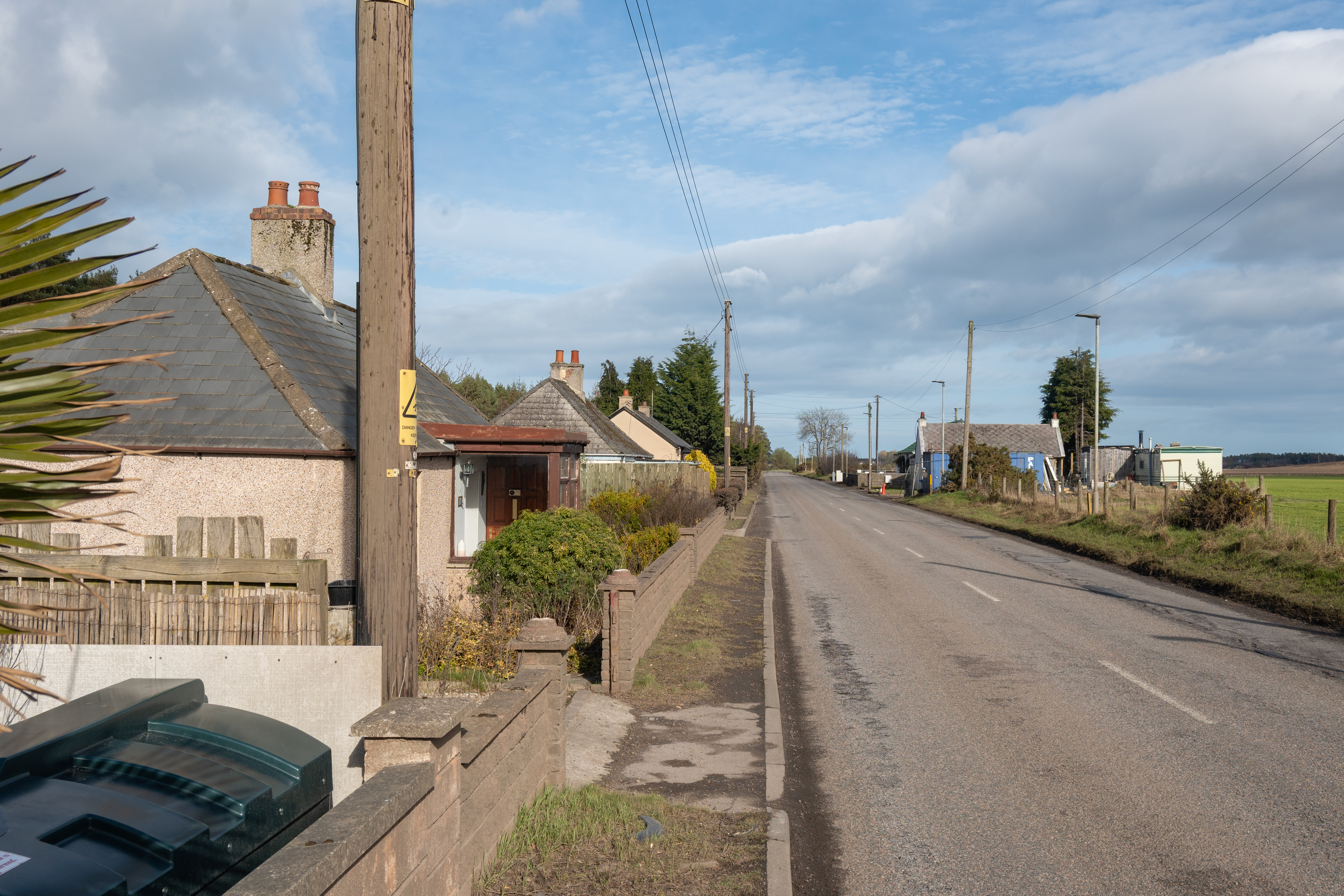
- Crofts of Dipple

- Location within Moray
- OS grid reference: NJ32975 58308
- Council area: Moray
- Lieutenancy area: Moray
- Country: Scotland
- Sovereign state: United Kingdom
- Post town: Dipple
- Postcode district: IV32
- Dialling code: 01343
- Police: Scotland
- Fire: Scottish
- Ambulance: Scottish
- UK Parliament: Moray
- Scottish Parliament: Moray

Dipple (Scottish Gaelic: Diopal) is a village in the Parish of Speymouth, in Moray, Scotland, approximately 8 miles (13 km) east of Elgin and is located on the west bank of the River Spey. In medieval times Dipple was a parish in its own right and had a parish church dedicated to the Holy Ghost. This church is believed to have stood within the churchyard but no trace of it is now to be found there, although the graveyard may still be visited. A parson of Dipple is mentioned at the end of the twelfth century and, c.1208, the bishop of Moray used the parsonage revenues of Dipple, along with those of another parish (Rothven), to create a prebend within the cathedral at Elgin. The name Dipple is derived from the Gaelic word Diopal, meaning side of a hill.
