= Jean-Pierre Cayard =

French billionaire businessman

Jean-Pierre Cayard is a French billionaire businessman, who inherited the spirits manufacturer La Martiniquaise from his father, turning it into France's second-largest spirits group.

As of December 2025, Cayard has an estimated net worth of US$2.1 billion.
