= Cutty Sark (whisky) =

Blended Scotch whisky

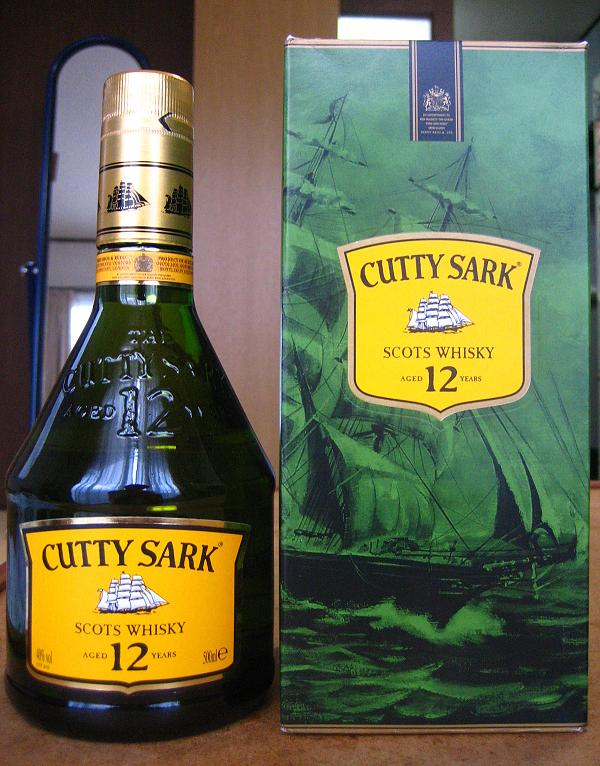
- Type: Scotch whisky
- Manufacturer: La Martiniquaise
- Origin: Scotland
- Introduced: 23 March 1923
- Alcohol by volume: 40%
- Website: Cutty Sark

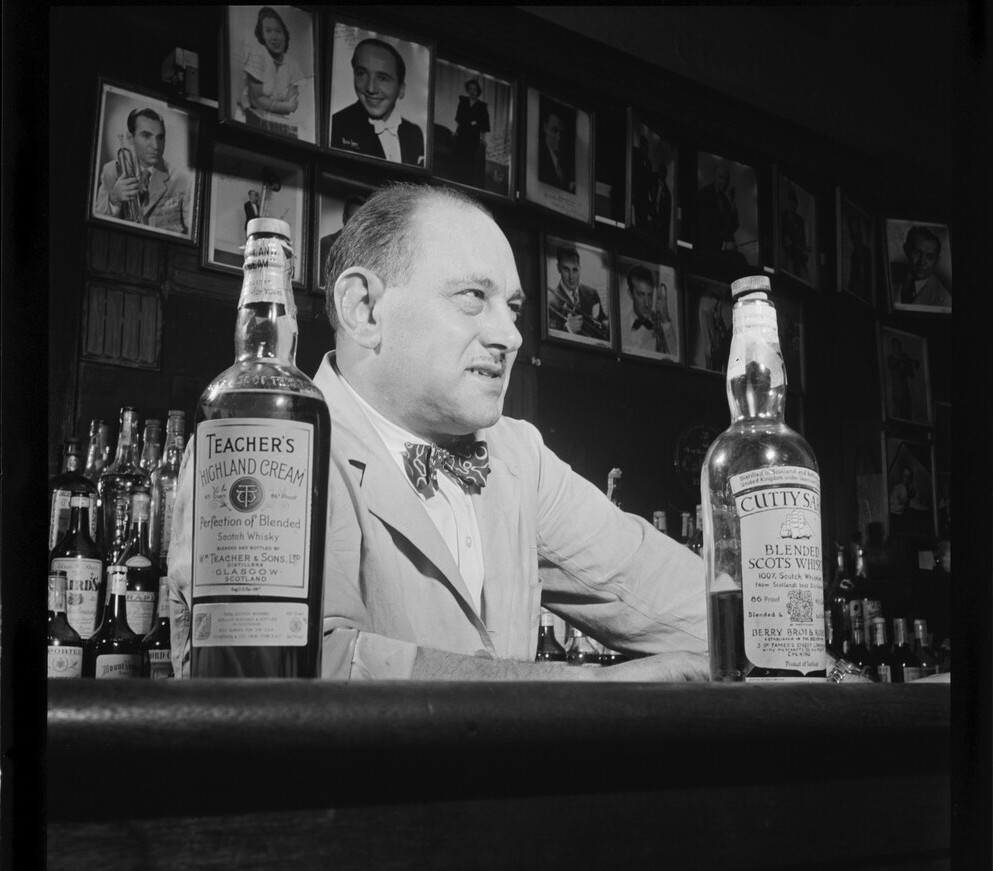
Teacher's Highland Cream and Cutty Sark at Charlie's Tavern, New York, N.Y., between 1946 and 1948

Cutty Sark is a brand of blended Scotch whisky produced by La Martiniquaise in Scotland.

== History ==
The whisky was created on 23 March 1923 as a product of Berry Bros. & Rudd, with the first home of the blend considered to be at The Glenrothes distillery in the Speyside region of Scotland.

== Name and label ==
The name comes from the River Clyde-built clipper ship Cutty Sark, whose name came from the Scots term "cutty-sark", the short shirt [skirt] prominently mentioned in the famous poem by Robert Burns, "Tam o' Shanter".

The drawing of the clipper ship Cutty Sark on the label of the whisky bottles is a work of the Swedish artist Carl Georg August Wallin. He was a mariner painter, and this is probably his most famous ship painting. This drawing has been on the whisky bottles since 1955. The Tall Ships' Races for large sailing ships were originally known as The Cutty Sark Tall Ships' Races, under the terms of sponsorship by the whisky brand.

== US distribution ==
The Buckingham Corporation, incorporated on 2 October 1933 in Delaware, with offices in New York City, obtained the sole right to import Cutty Sark Scotch Whisky for resale in the United States. In August 1964, Schenley Industries purchased more than half of the stock, of Buckingham Corporation. In November 1970, Schenley agreed to sell Buckingham Corporation to Northwest Industries, formed by the Chicago and North Western Railway. Buckingham was acquired by Allied Lyons (later Allied Domecq) in 1989. Skyy Spirits bought the distribution rights from Allied Domeq in 1999. After Edrington acquired the brand, it switched US distribution from Skyy to Rémy Cointreau US. Edrington launched its own distribution unit in the US in 2014.

== Bottlings ==
The most popular member of the range, Cutty Sark Original Scots Whisky, is sold in a distinctive green bottle with a yellow label. The range also includes other blends, and premium blends, currently identified by the age of the youngest whisky in the blending.

== Reviews ==
Cutty Sark has received modest reviews from international spirit ratings organisations. In 2008, 2009, and 2011 for example, the San Francisco World Spirits Competition awarded the Cutty Sark blended scotch bronze and silver medals. The Beverage Testing Institute gave Cutty Sark modest scores of 85 and 87 in 2008 and 2011, respectively.

... he could handle two fifths of Cutty Sark (as scotch and soda) every night" – Robert Baker, a Lyndon B. Johnson Senate Aide
