= Speyside Cooperage =

Cooperage located in Craigellachie, Scotland

Coordinates: 57°28′57″N 3°10′52″W

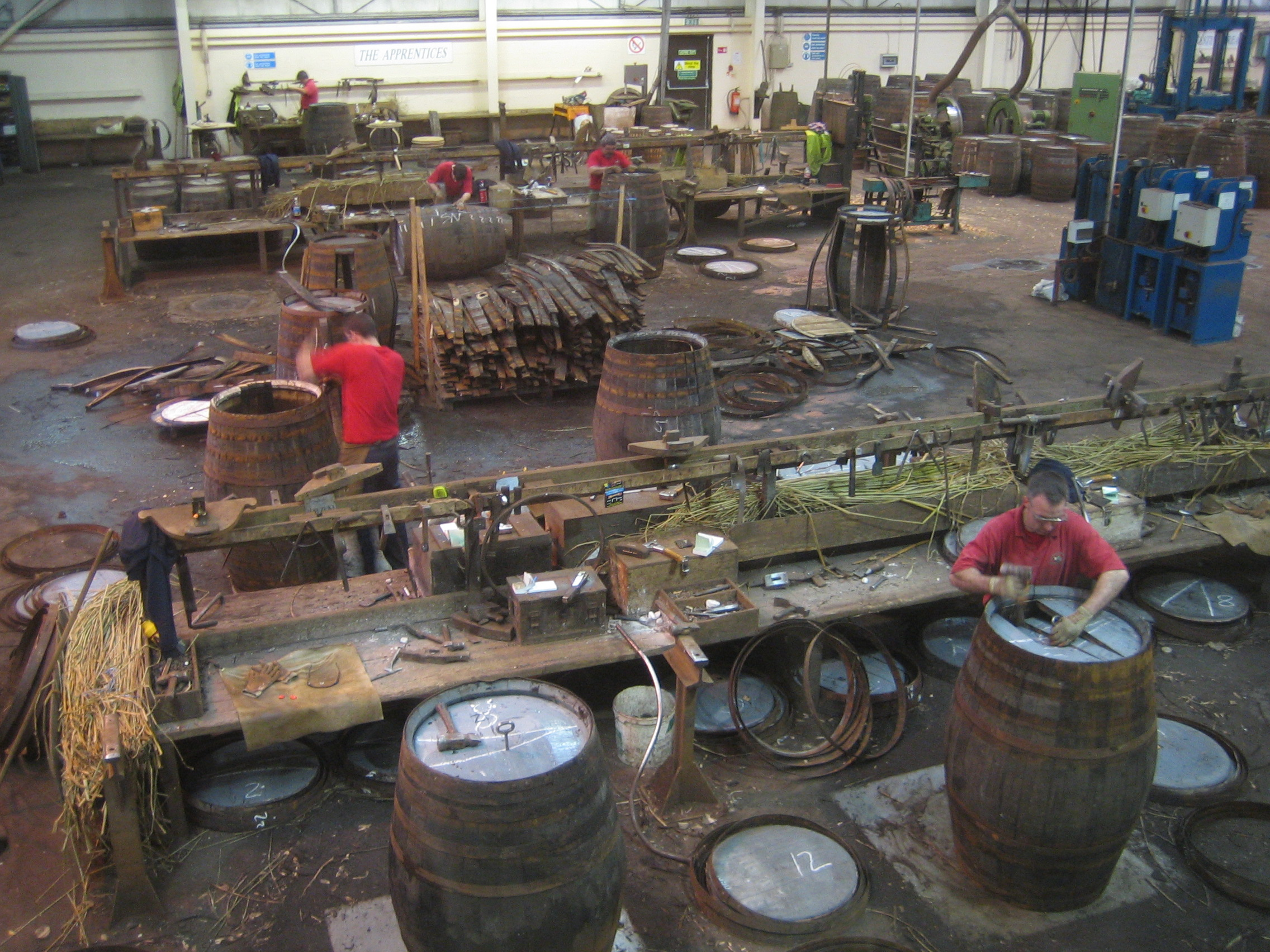
Speyside Cooperage

The Speyside Cooperage is a cooperage located in Craigellachie, Aberlour, Scotland. Its visitor centre, the only such in Britain, is part of the Malt Whisky Trail, started in the early 1980s.

Each year, it produces and repairs nearly 150,000 oak casks used by the surrounding Speyside Whisky distilleries, as well as distilleries elsewhere throughout Scotland.

Owned by the Taylor family since its founding in 1947, the cooperage was sold in 2008 to the French firm Tonnellerie François Frères.

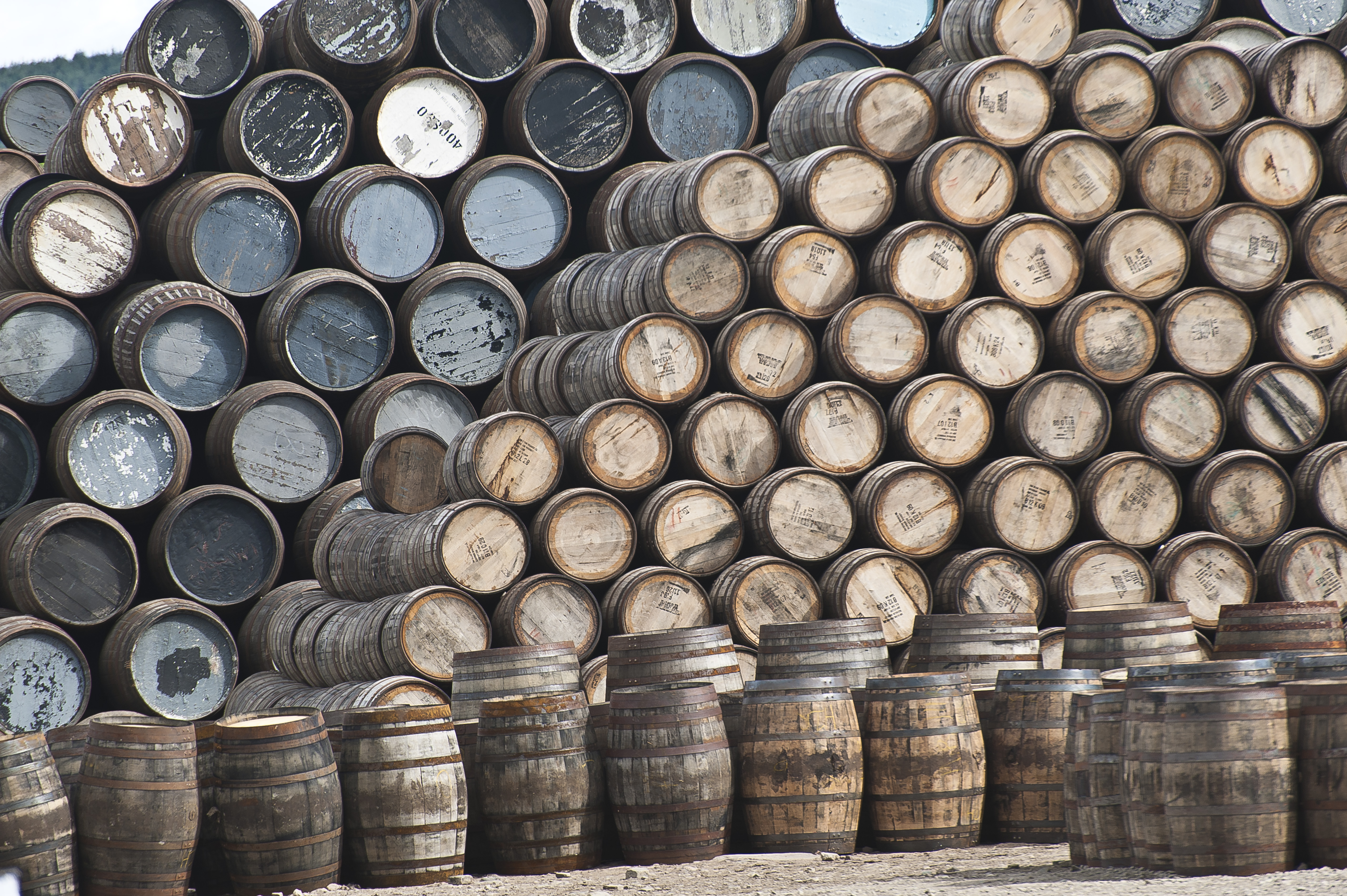
Barrel storage in the open

According to a 2012 BBC article, visitors to the cooperage can view the making of a cask from start to completion, employing "traditional methods and tools for creating exceptional casks from American oak, many of which are sent around the world".
