= Garmouth railway station =

Former railway station in Scotland

Garmouth
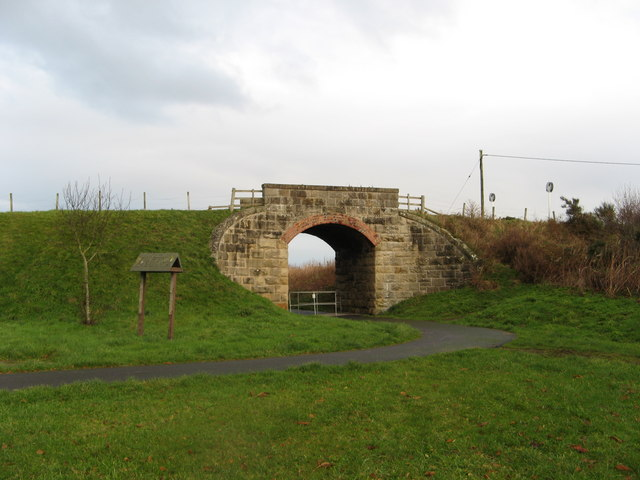
- An old railway overbridge at Garmouth

General information
- Location: Garmouth, Moray; Scotland
- Coordinates: 57.661408°N 3.116195°W
- Grid reference: NJ 3350 6405
- Platforms: 1 (2)

Other information
- Status: Disused

History
- Pre-grouping: Great North of Scotland Railway
- Post-grouping: London and North Eastern Railway

Key dates
- 12 August 1884: station opened
- 6 May 1968: Closed
Location

Garmouth railway station was a railway station in Garmouth, parish of Urquhart, Moray. The railway station was opened by the Great North of Scotland Railway (GNoSR) on its Moray Firth coast line in 1884, served by Aberdeen to Elgin trains. It served the villages of Kingston-on-Spey and Garmouth and closed to regular passenger traffic on 6 May 1968 on the same date as the line itself.

In 1923 the GNoSR became part of the London and North Eastern Railway and at nationalisation in 1948 became part of British Railways. The line was recommended for closure by Dr Beeching's report "The Reshaping of British Railways" and closed on 6 May 1968.

== History ==
=== Background ===
In 1881 the Great North of Scotland Railway put a bill to parliament to extend its Portsoy line along the Moray Firth as far as Buckie. In 1882 the Great North of Scotland applied for permission to build a 25 1/4-mile (40.6 km) line from Portsoy following the coast to Buckie and then running on to Elgin.

=== Great North of Scotland Railway ===
The GNoSR station opened as Garmouth on 12 August 1884 and to goods on 5 May 1886 with the central section of the coast line, served by through Aberdeen to Elgin trains. In 1923 the Great North of Scotland Railway was absorbed by the London and North Eastern Railway. This company was nationalised in 1948, and services were then provided by British Railways. The station and line was recommended for closure by Dr Beeching in his report "The Reshaping of British Railways" and closed on 6 May 1968.

== Services ==
The GNoSR station was served by through trains a day between Aberdeen to Elgin. There were no Sunday services.

== The station infrastructure ==
Garmouth station had one platform with a typical wooden station building and what appear to be additional toilet buildings on either end. A stationmaster's house sits just beyond the Urquhart end of the platform. A crane stood in the goods yard and a storage hut was located on the platform.

The 1903 OS map shows that a considerable number of changes took place with a reduction from two to one platform, the removal of a passing loop, an overbridge and two signal boxes. A goods shed and weighing machine are shown with what may have been a bay platform on the Spey Bay end. A small shelter is shown on the second platform together with one of the signal boxes. The station was host to a LNER camping coach from 1935 and 1936 and possibly one for some of 1934. A photograph taken in 1960 may show the grass covered second platform edge with no passing loop and the 1957 OS map confirms this.

The Moray Coast line was predominantly single track apart from a double track section between Buckie and Portessie. Track lifting took place shortly after closure in 1968.

== The Speyside Way ==
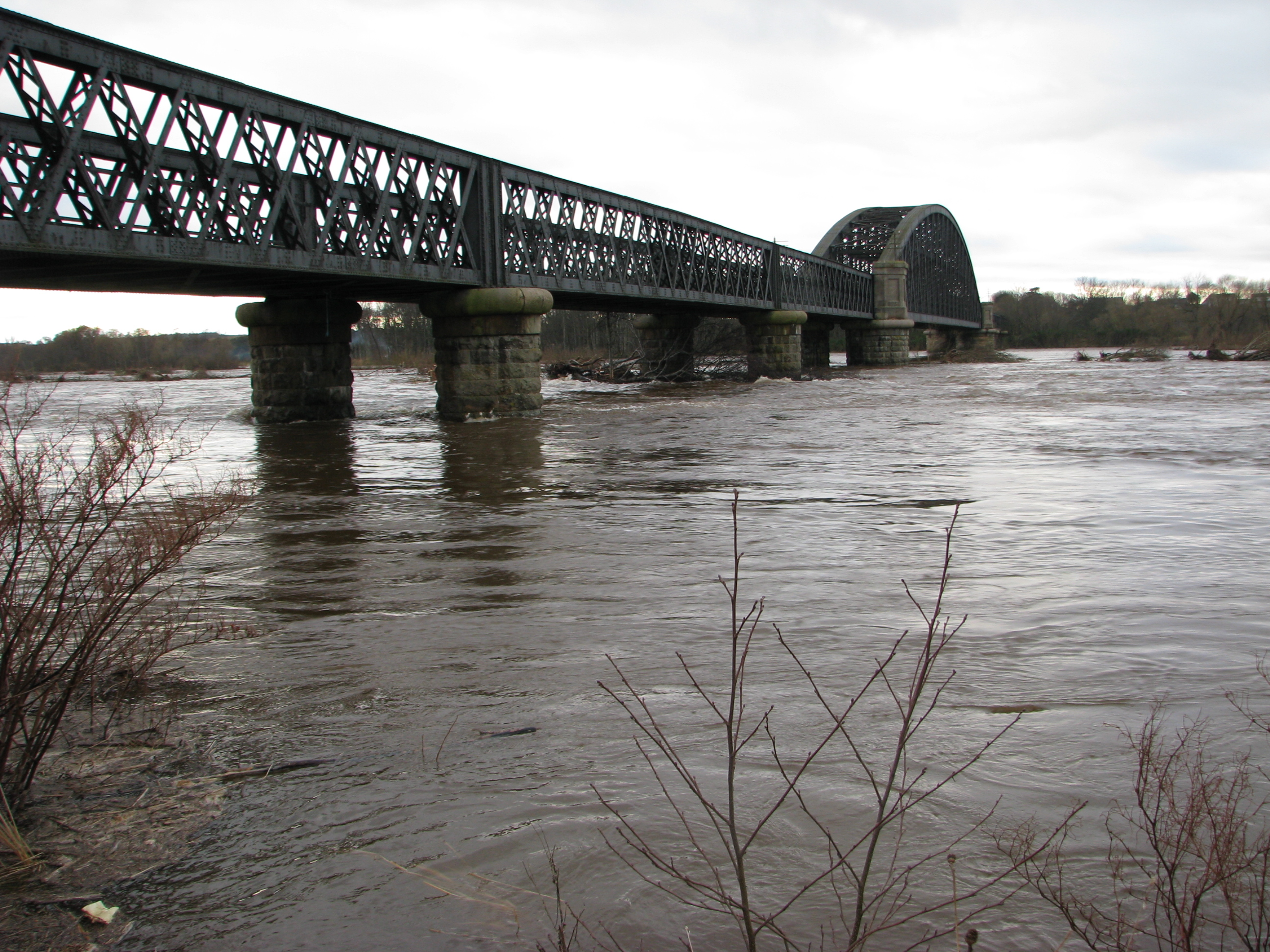
The Spey Viaduct and river near Garmouth.

The Spey Viaduct formerly carried the Moray Coast railway over the River Spey to Spey Bay station and beyond, however it now serves walkers using the Speyside Way that runs from Aviemore to Buckpool old harbour. On 14 December 2025, the viaduct collapsed.

Preceding station	Historical railways	Following station
Urquhart	Great North of Scotland	Spey Bay
