= Kingston, Moray =

Coordinates: 57.6746058883°N 3.111775523053°W

Kingston on Spey: Scottish Gaelic: Dalachaidh Uarach
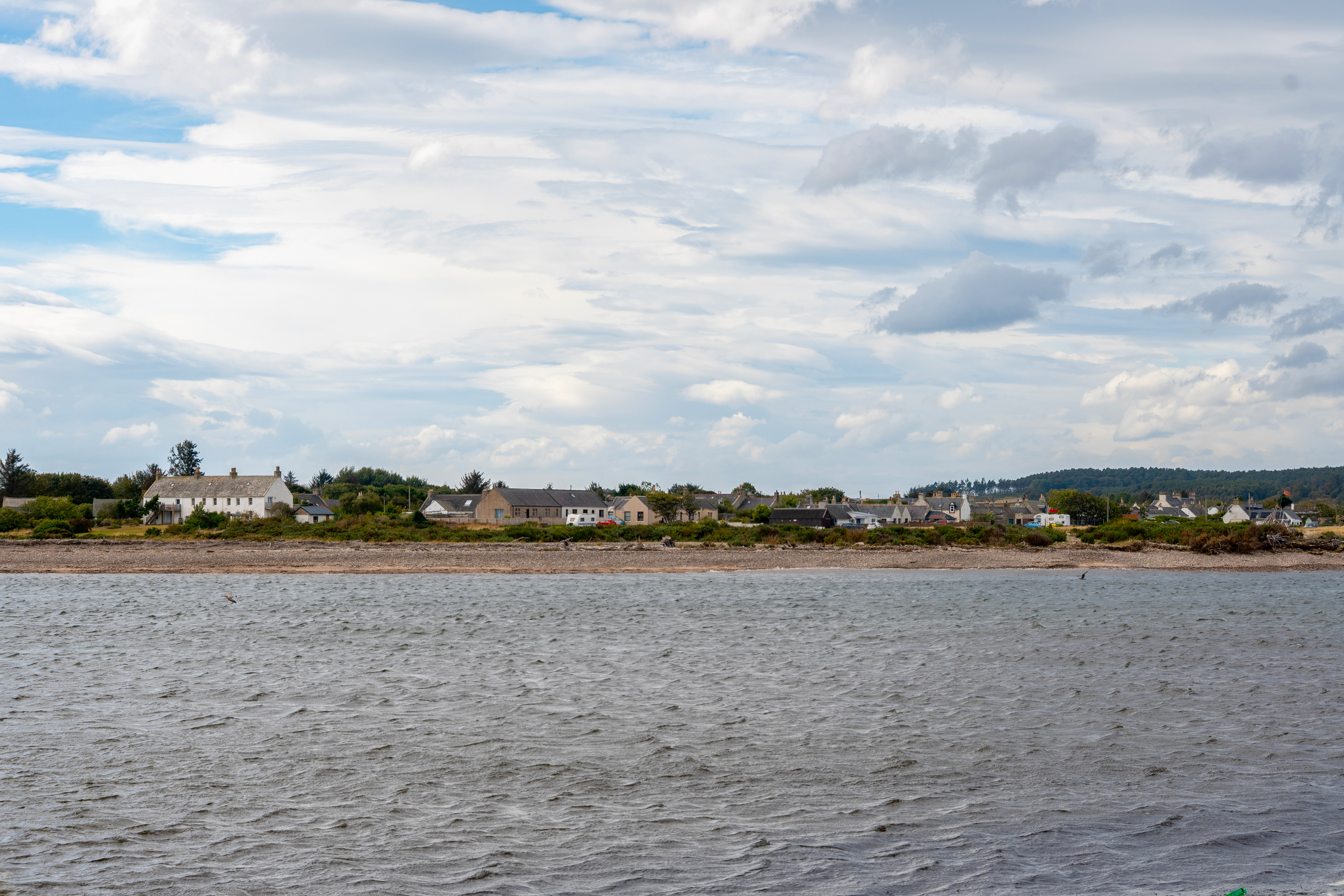
- Kingston, as seen from Spey Bay

- Location within Moray
- OS grid reference: NJ3662
- Council area: Moray
- Lieutenancy area: Moray
- Country: Scotland
- Sovereign state: United Kingdom
- Police: Scotland
- Fire: Scottish
- Ambulance: Scottish
- UK Parliament: Moray West, Nairn and Strathspey
- Scottish Parliament: Moray; Highlands and Islands

Kingston on Spey is a small coastal village in Moray, Scotland. It is situated immediately north of Garmouth at the western side of the mouth of the River Spey on the coast of the Moray Firth. Kingston was founded in 1784 and was named after Kingston upon Hull, in East Yorkshire.

== History ==
Kingston's past includes a large shipbuilding industry started in the 18th century by two men from Kingston upon Hull, who named the village after their home town. The shipbuilding industry used an enormous amount of timber from the local surrounding forests.

The shipbuilding industry died off partly due to wooden ships being replaced by iron ones.

Furthermore, the course of the River Spey was always changing, bringing stones down river and silting up the shipbuilding areas. In 1829, some of the village homes were lost in a great flood, the "Muckle Spate".

== Nature ==
Because of the dolphins, salmon, otters, osprey, seals and numerous waterfowl and other birds to be seen in the area, Kingston attracts birdwatchers and other nature enthusiasts. In addition to the Speyside Way, there are footpaths along the Lein, Burnside, the Browlands towards the village of Garmouth, the Spey Viaduct, and the local stone beaches. The Garmouth & Kingston Golf Club is located between the two villages.

== Notable people ==
- Isabel Turner (1936–2021), Canadian politician, was born in Kingston

== See also ==
- Garmouth railway station - a station that once served the area.
