= Spey Bay railway station =

Former railway station in Scotland

Spey Bay
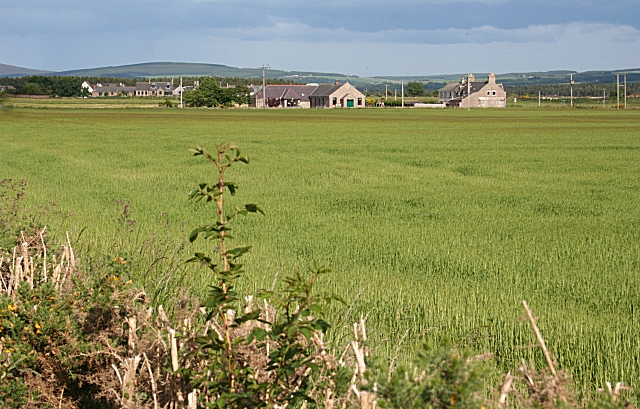
- Nether Dallacy as seen from the old railway, now the Speyside Way

General information
- Location: Spey Bay, Moray; Scotland
- Coordinates: 57.6628°N 3.0831°W
- Grid reference: NJ 35479 64181
- Platforms: 2

Other information
- Status: Disused

History
- Pre-grouping: Great North of Scotland Railway
- Post-grouping: London and North Eastern Railway

Key dates
- 1 May 1886: station opened
- 6 May 1968: Closed
Location

Spey Bay railway station was a railway station in Spey Bay, Moray. The railway station was opened by the Great North of Scotland Railway (GNoSR) on its Moray Firth coast line in 1886, served by Aberdeen to Elgin trains. The station was originally named Fochabers-on-Spey railway station on 1 May 1886. In November 1893 it became Fochabers railway station, Fochabers and Spey Bay railway station on 1 January 1916 before finally becoming on 1 January 1918 Spey Bay railway station. It closed to regular passenger traffic on 6 May 1968 on the same date as the line itself.

In 1923 the GNoSR became part of the London and North Eastern Railway and at nationalisation in 1948 became part of British Railways. The line was recommended for closure by Dr Beeching's report "The Reshaping of British Railways" and closed on 6 May 1968.

== History ==
=== Background ===
In 1881 the Great North of Scotland Railway put a bill to parliament to extend its Portsoy line along the Moray Firth as far as Buckie. In 1882 the Great North of Scotland applied for permission to build a 25 1/4-mile (40.6 km) line from Portsoy following the coast to Buckie and then running on to Elgin.

=== Great North of Scotland Railway ===
The GNoSR station opened as Fochabers-on-Spey on 1 May 1886 and to goods on 5 May 1886 with the central section of the coast line, served by through Aberdeen to Elgin trains. In the 1923 Grouping, the Great North of Scotland Railway was absorbed by the London and North Eastern Railway. This company was nationalised in 1948, and services were then provided by British Railways. The station and line was recommended for closure by Dr Beeching in his report "The Reshaping of British Railways" and closed on 6 May 1968.

== Services ==
The GNoSR station was served by through trains a day between Aberdeen to Elgin. There were no Sunday services.

== Station infrastructure ==
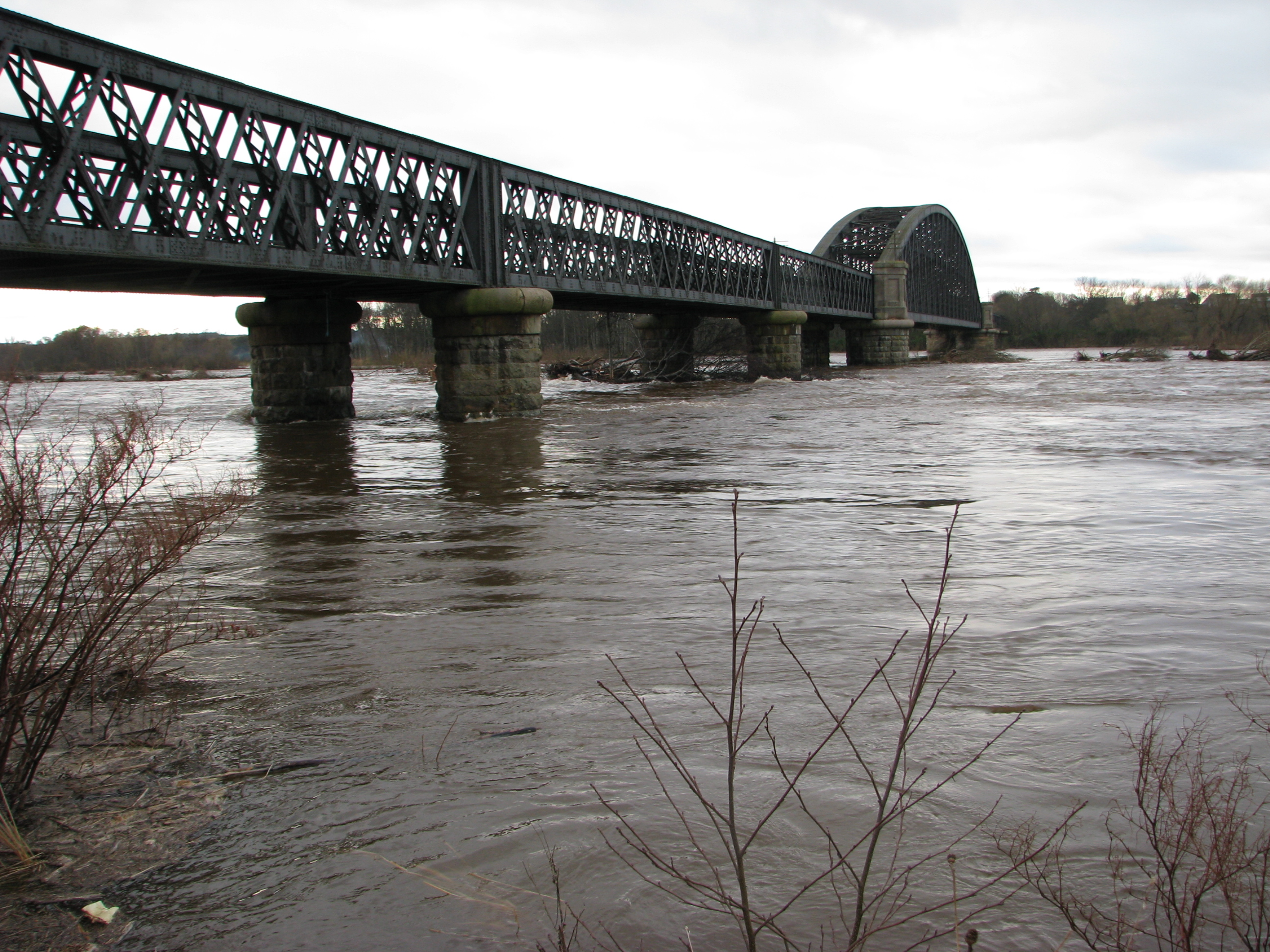
The Spey Viaduct and river near Garmouth.

Spey Bay station had two platforms on a passing loop with a typical wooden station building on the 'Up' line and two wooden signal boxes, one of which has been moved to the Keith and Dufftown Railway. A London and North Eastern Railway style passenger footbridge was present. The 1903 OS map shows a small goods shed and three sidings. The station was host to a LNER camping coach from 1935 to 1939 and possibly one for some of 1934. A 1959 photograph shows a significant number of waggons in the station's sidings, possibly being stored there.

The line was predominantly single track apart from a double track section between Buckie and Portessie. Track lifting took place shortly after closure in 1968. The station site is now a private dwelling with landscaped grounds.

== Spey Viaduct ==
After the line was closed Spey Viaduct, also known as Garmouth Viaduct, between Spey Bay railway station and Garmouth railway station, was used by pedestrians and cyclists, forming part of both the National Cycle Network (NCN 1) route and the Moray Coastal Trail. It was maintained by Moray Council. On 14 December 2025 the viaduct collapsed into the river. Moray Council determined the apparent cause as scour, and said that it could not afford to replace the bridge.

Preceding station	Historical railways	Following station
Garmouth	Great North of Scotland	Portgordon
