= Portgordon =

Coordinates: 57.664°N 03.012°W

Portgordon: Scottish Gaelic: Port Ghòrdain; Paraffin City
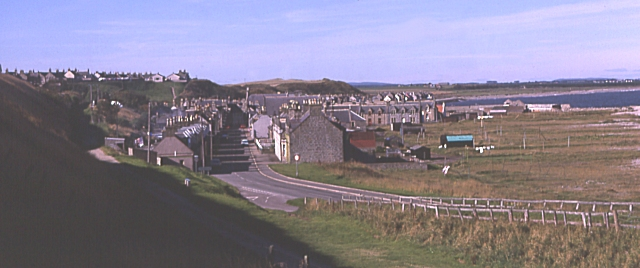

- Location within Moray
- Population: 790 (2020)
- OS grid reference: NJ3964
  - Edinburgh: 190 km (120 mi)
  - London: 710 km (440 mi)
- Civil parish: Rathven
- Council area: Moray
- Lieutenancy area: Banffshire
- Country: Scotland
- Sovereign state: United Kingdom
- Post town: Buckie
- Postcode district: AB56
- Dialling code: 01542
- Police: Scotland
- Fire: Scottish
- Ambulance: Scottish
- UK Parliament: Aberdeenshire North and Moray East
- Scottish Parliament: Moray

Portgordon, or sometimes Port Gordon, (Scottish Gaelic: Port Ghòrdain) is a village in Moray, Scotland, 2 km (1 1/4 mi) south-west of Buckie. It was established in 1797 by Alexander Gordon, 4th Duke of Gordon as a fishing village. It had a population of 844 at the time of the 2011 census. The Portgordon Community Harbour Group was trying to regenerate the harbour and open a marina.

== History ==
By 1793 Buckie was the principal fishing community in the area. At that time fishing was confined to line fishing for cod, ling and haddock, in boats no larger than 14 tons. Development of the industry was limited by the lack of a proper harbour, and disputes amongst the three owners of the various boats. One of these, Alexander, 4th Duke of Gordon, decided to establish a new village, just to the west of the tiny community of Gollachy which comprised but a few houses in the area that is now Gordon Street. Work was underway on the harbour in 1795 and stone was shipped from Lossiemouth in 1796. In 1797 houses were built for ten fishermen and their families from Nether Buckie (the western side of Buckie). This was the third new village the Duke had established, but unlike Fochabers and Tomintoul before, this was a smaller venture and little planning was done with regards to street layout.

The land immediately to the west of Portgordon was owned by Patrick Steuart of Tannachy and Auchlunkart, who built there the Seatown of Tannachy (now more commonly Porttannachy) during the 19th century. At this time trade was expanding, not just in fishing and boat building, but in the export of grain, and import of salt, coal and lumber, and the building of granaries. This placed Portgordon at a great advantage over Buckie which was still limited by its natural harbour to fishing alone. By the 1850s a post office had opened and there were many coopers, fish processors and net makers. By 1861 the population had grown to around 630. The opening of a fertiliser factory in Keith lead to traffic in bones through the harbour too.

Rail service began in 1886 with the opening of Portgordon railway station on the Moray Firth coast line on the Great North of Scotland Railway. The line became part of the London and North Eastern Railway in 1923 and part of British Railways in 1948. The Beeching Report recommended closure, and it was closed on 6 May 1968. In 1981 a bowling green and play park were opened on the site of the old station.

The Local Government (Scotland) Act 1889 established Banffshire County Council and this led to the establishment of street names throughout the village, and the demise of Seatown of Tannachy and Gollachy as distinct communities.

A boat-building industry began, with local yards first constructing Zulus and from 1903 steam drifters. In 1907 one yard employed fifty men and launched a drifter every month or so but this business in drifters had dried up by 1915, though the yard continued to produce salmon cobles.

Street lighting was introduced in the 1920s, and paraffin was used as there was no mains gas or electricity. Portgordon was one of the last communities to get electricity in 1937, and the village was nicknamed "Paraffin City".

During World War II in 1940, two German spies, Karl Drüeke and Vera Erikson were captured at the railway station and held at the police station.

=== Portgordon harbour ===
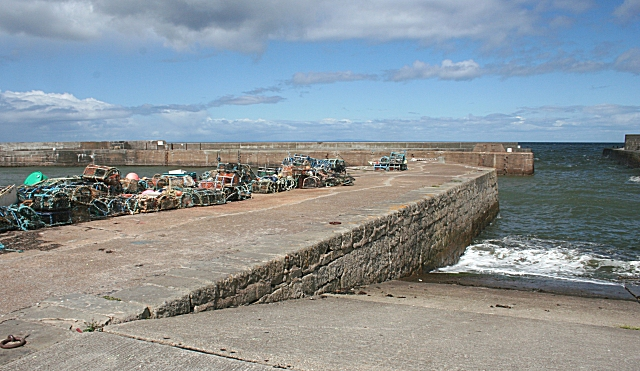
The harbour entrance is open to the north. From the piles of creels it looks as if there is still crab and lobster fishing going on in 2008

The original harbour of 1797 was constructed with wooden piers. Both fishing and an import/export trade thrived, and Portgordon became the principal port in the area.

The Gordon estates transferred first to George Gordon, 5th Duke of Gordon and thence to his nephew Charles Gordon-Lennox, 5th Duke of Richmond. In 1859 the Duchess of Gordon presented a barometer for the use of the fishermen and it was installed at the harbour. The harbour committee turned in the late 1860s to Charles Gordon-Lennox, 6th Duke of Richmond when the condition of the harbour was deteriorating and generally becoming inadequate for the increasing traffic. He agreed to pay for reconstruction if the fishermen would assist with transport of materials from Lossiemouth and Hopeman. The new harbour would enclose 3 acres, and cranes were to be installed for the first time at Portgordon. Construction took place between 1870 and 1874 and subsequently over a hundred boats were registered in the harbour. Success was short-lived though, and the number of boats was in decline by 1881 due to competition from new harbours in Buckie and Buckpool.

By 1904 the harbour was beginning to silt up and boats were having to wait for the tide to be able to enter harbour. Charles Gordon-Lennox, 7th Duke of Richmond was asked to build an extension to the eastern pier to stop the beach from washing into the harbour, but only dredging was carried out, in 1906 and 1907. In 1908 the duke offered to give the harbour to the community along with £2,000 to pay for the extension, but this offer was turned down in 1909, with many villagers concerned about maintenance costs. In 1935 ownership of the harbour transferred from the Gordon-Lennox family to the Crown Estate Commissioners when Frederick Gordon-Lennox, 9th Duke of Richmond sold his Scottish estates to pay crippling death duties.

By 1945 there were only fourteen boats in the harbour, and little commercial activity. The Crown Estate Commissioners closed the harbour in 1947, and it was thereafter used only by a few pleasure craft. The structures were further damaged in the North Sea flood of 1953. By the late 1970s the north-west corner was breached and the mouth of the harbour was seriously silted up. Funded by various grants, the 69th Gurkha Independent Field Squadron rebuilt the harbour between 1985 and 1989.

== Fishing ==
Reporting on Portessie, Buckie and Portgordon in 1911, the Annual Report of the Fishery Board states: "The majority of fishermen at these creeks are seldom at home longer than to repair their boats for the different herring fishings throughout the year, working from the principal centres in Scotland, England and Ireland. The fishermen are in a prosperous condition". The principal kind of fish landed in Portgordon for that year were codlings.

Fishery Statistics

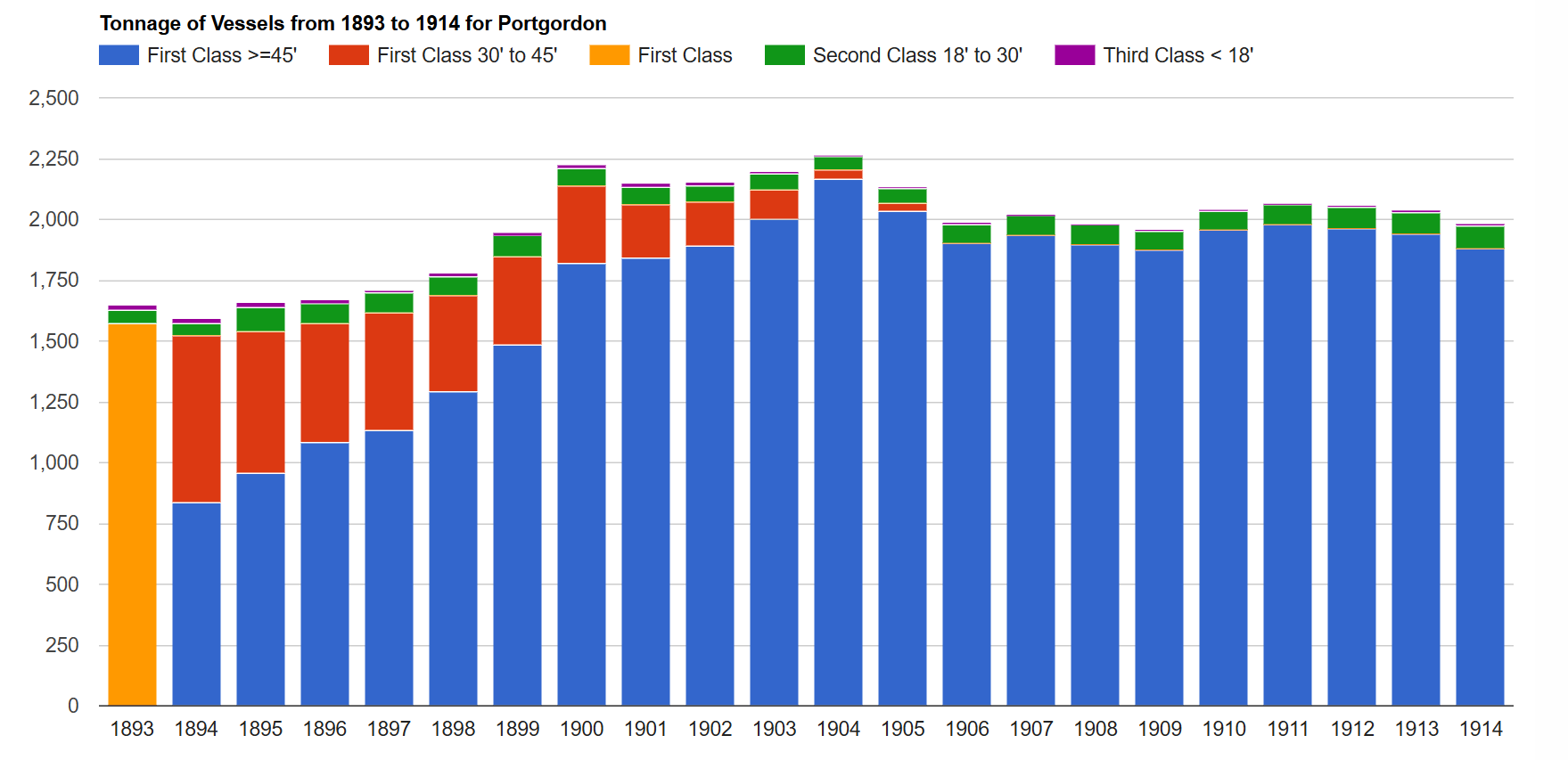
Tonnage of vessels

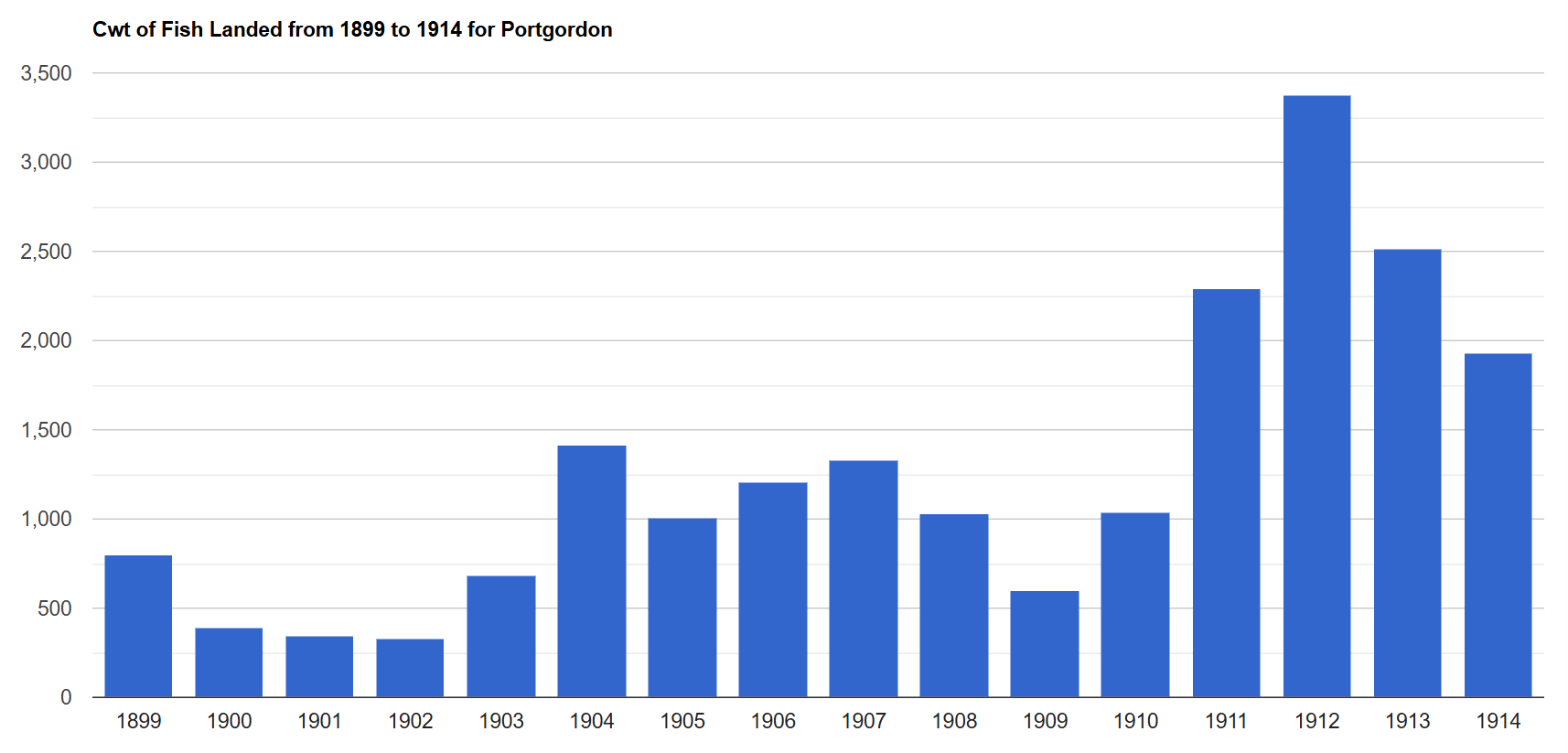
Cwt of fish landed

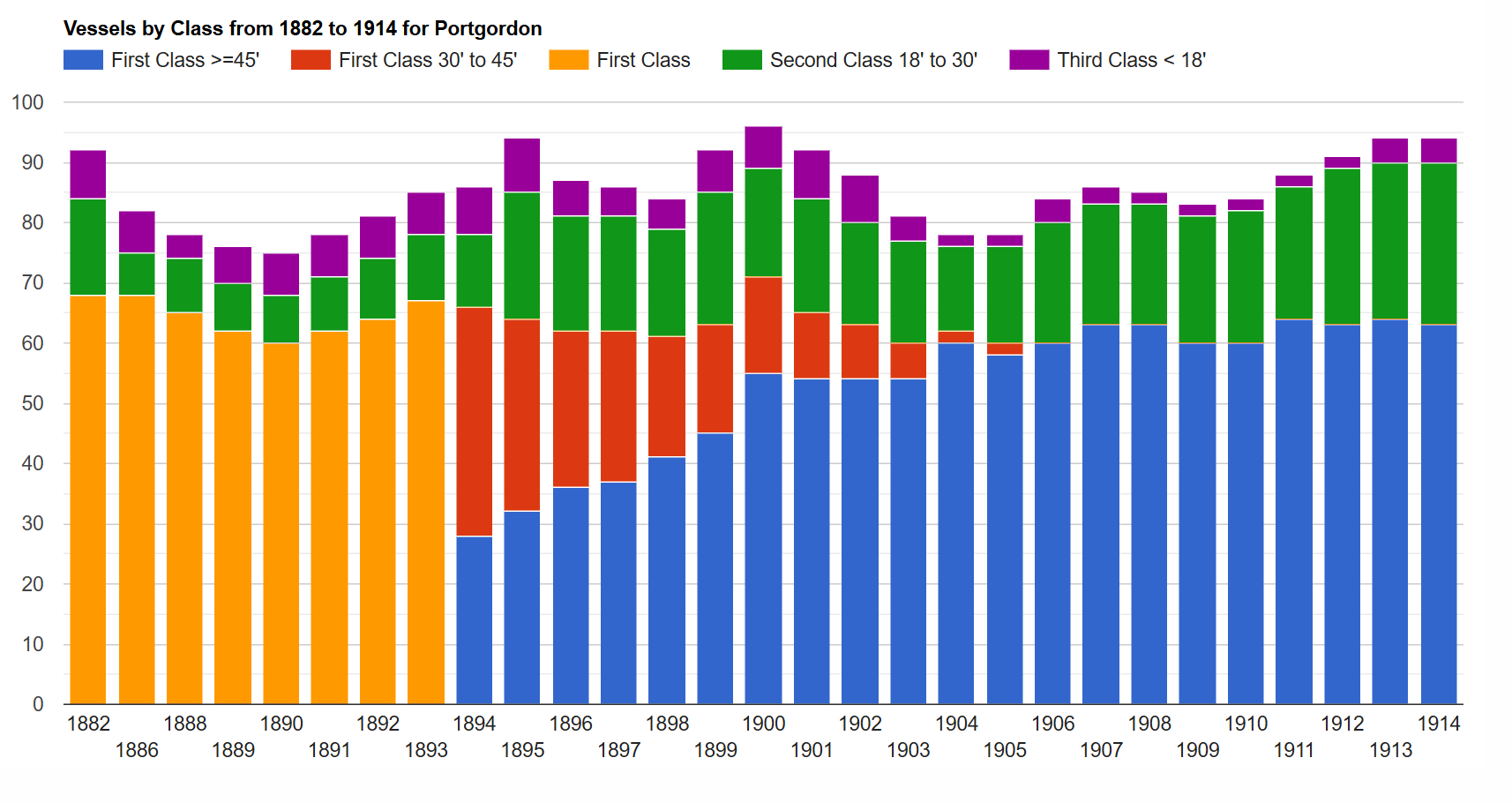
Vessels by class

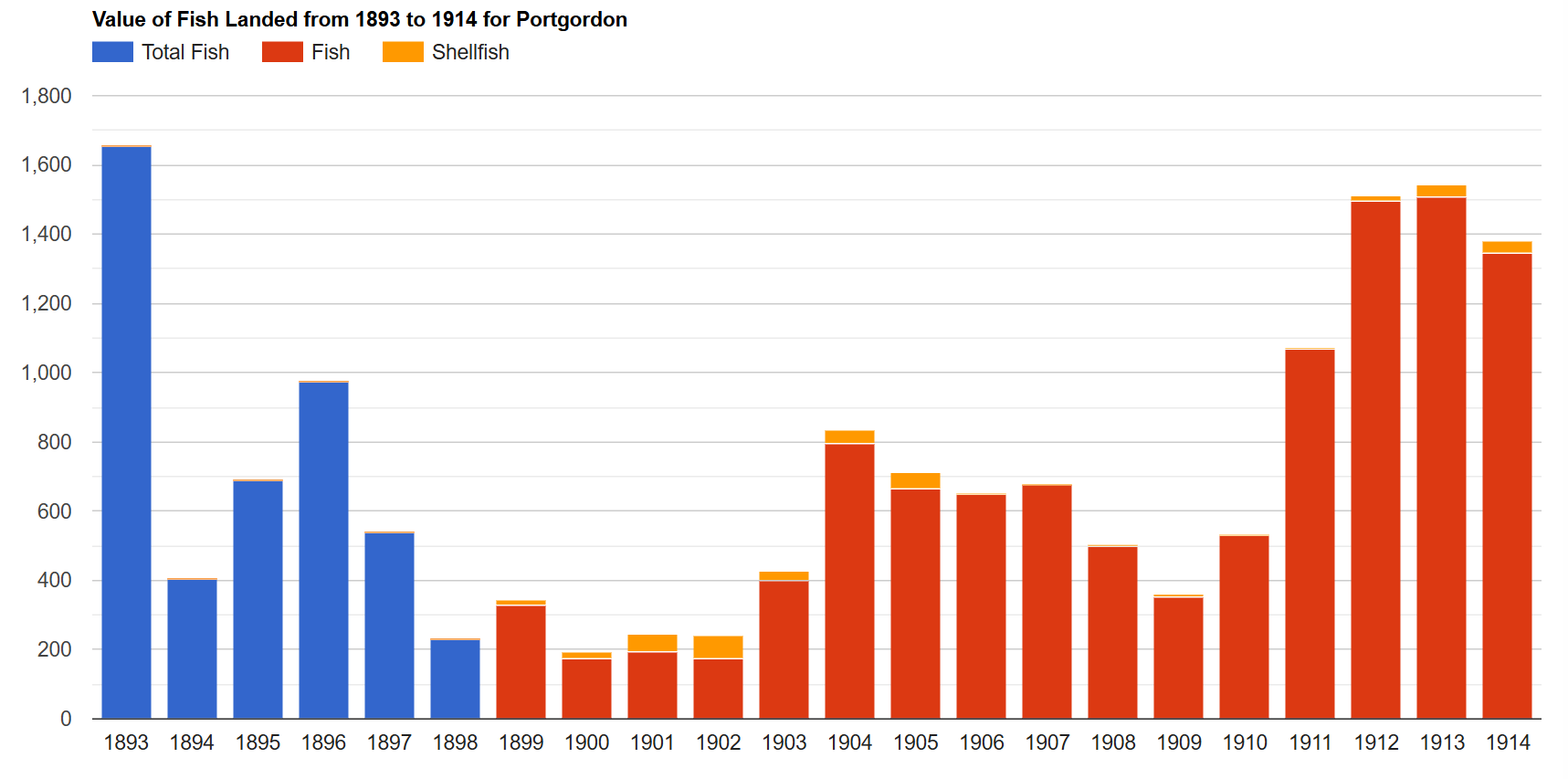
Value (£) of fish landed

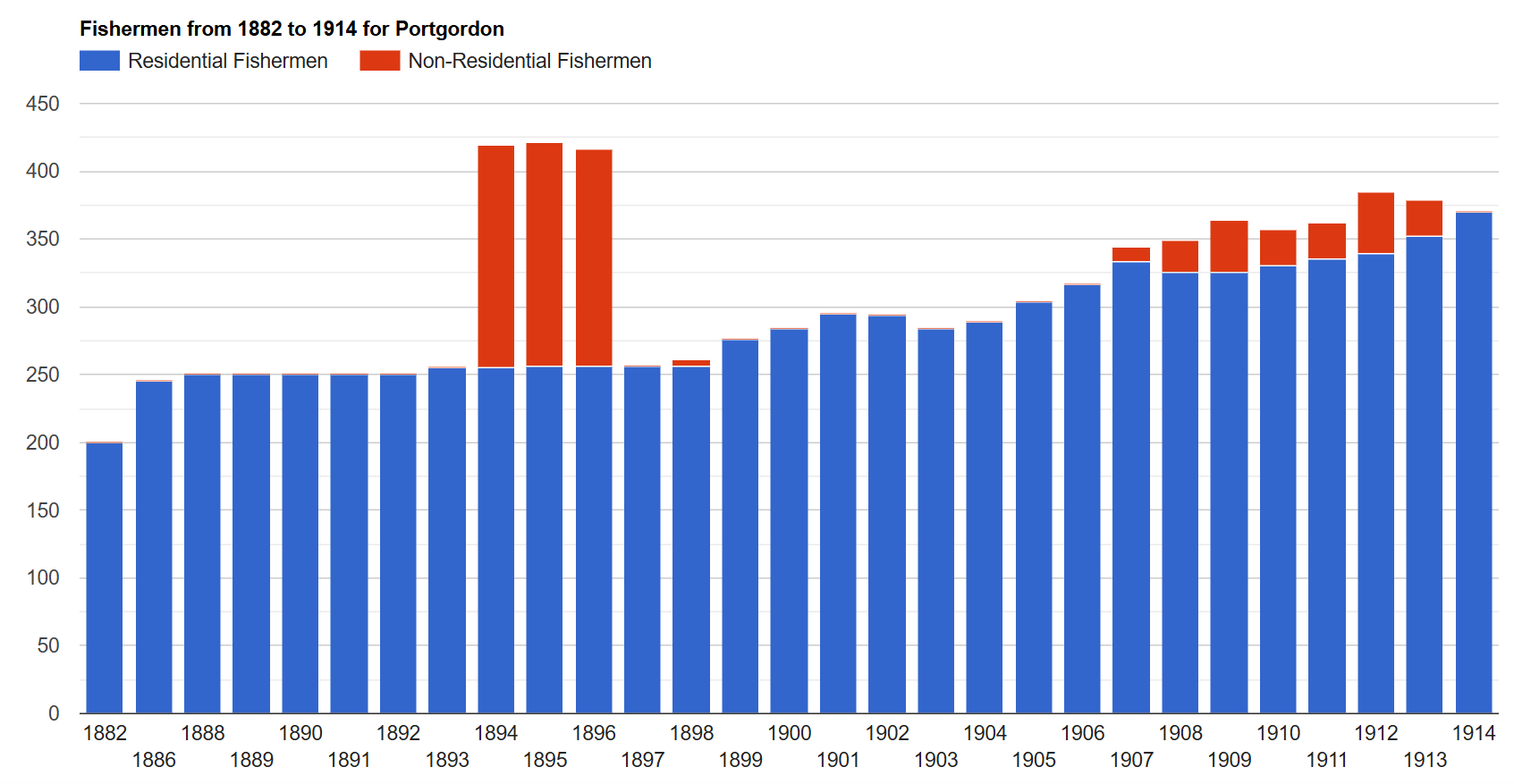
Fishermen

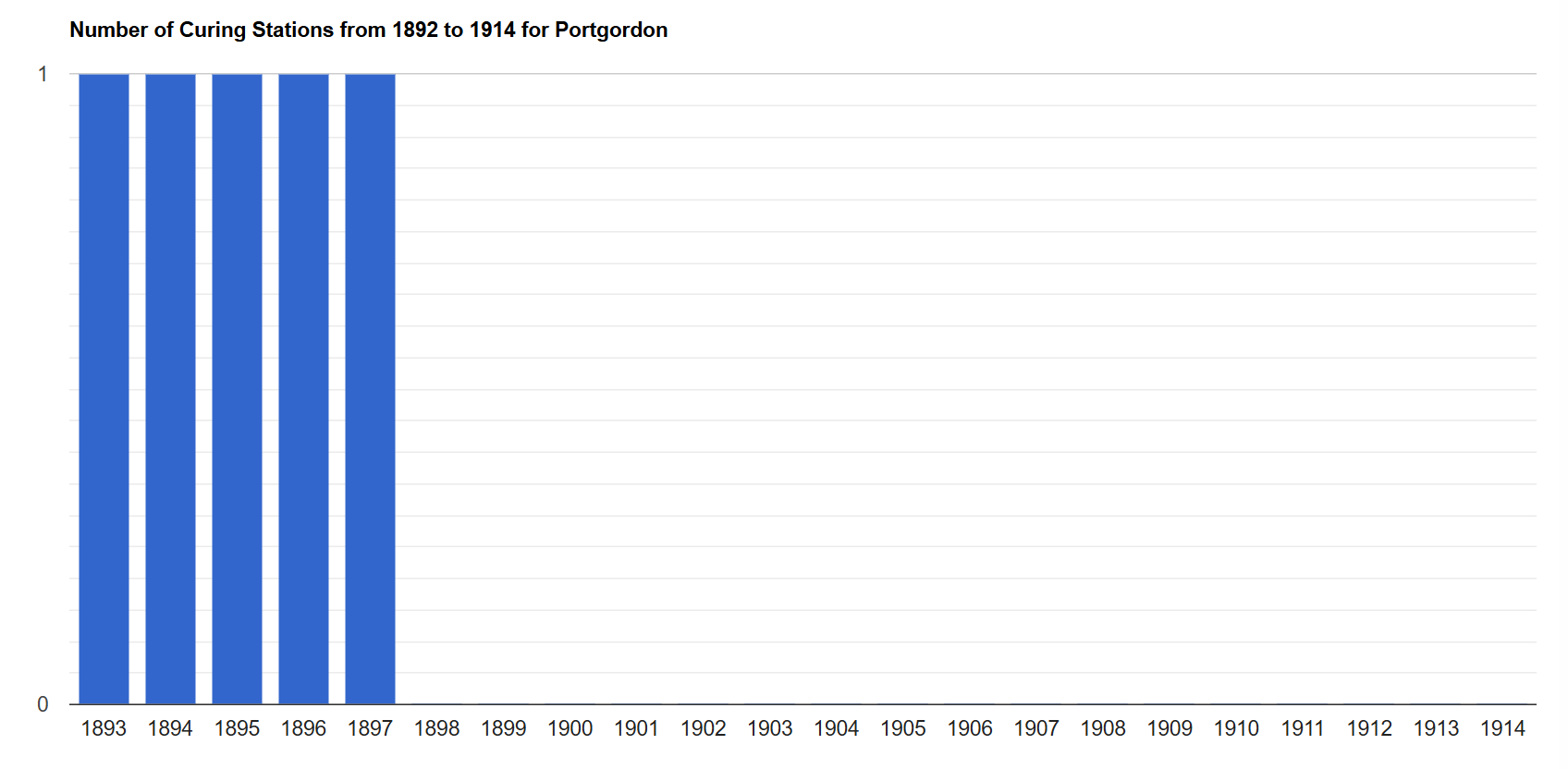
Number of curing stations

=== Churches ===
In the early part of the village's history the populace was served by churches in other communities nearby. Roman Catholics in the area had first been using the clandestine church of St Ninian's Church, Tynet, which was supplanted in 1788 by St Gregory's Church, Preshome. St. Gregory's was the first church building to be openly built by Catholics in Scotland since the Reformation of 1560. There was a quoad sacra parish of the Church of Scotland at Enzie following a mission chapel which dated from 1728. The United Free Church had a church at Enzie crossroads a mile to the south of the village.

In 1860 a Methodist minister, James Turner, preached a series of sermons which resulted in an interest in Methodism and the closure of six of the ten pubs in the village. A Methodist congregation was formed and the present church was built in 1874. In 1902 the United Free Church opened a new church hall in Portgordon.

== Landmarks ==
A memorial to those who had lost their lives during World War I was unveiled on 9 June 1921. It is a 15-foot (4.6 m) Celtic cross of granite, situated in East High Street. It records the names of 28 killed during World War I and a further 28 added from World War II.

Gollachy ice house is somewhat unusual, being sited on the shore, and excavated rather than being built into side of a hill. It is of rubble construction, built in the early 19th century, with a hip roof of turf. It was restored in the 1970s and is a category B listed building.

== Transport ==
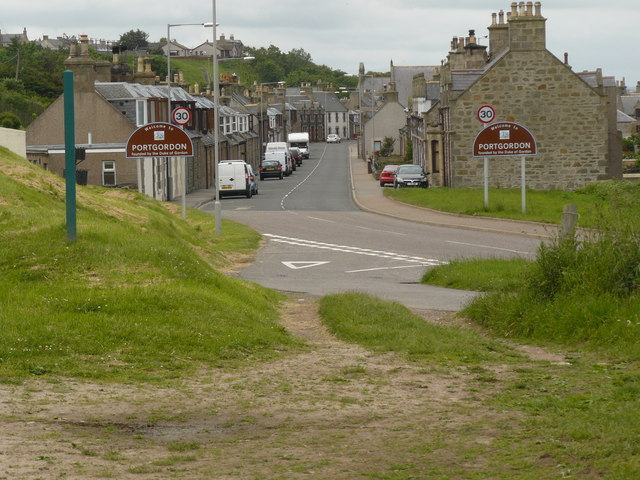
Portgordon, on the Speyside way, looking west along Gordon Road on the A990

Portgordon is on the A990 road. The Speyside Way, Moray Coast trail and National Cycle Route 1 pass through the village. The nearest railway stations are at Elgin and Keith.

== Education ==
Portgordon Primary School had a pupil enrollment of 60 as at 23 September 2014. In 2014, Moray Council's Sustainable Education Review recommended merging the school into Cluny Primary School in Buckie, but following petitions the council voted to give it a five-year reprieve; the school was active as of 2023.

== See also ==
- Portgordon railway station
- Scottish east coast fishery
- Vera von Schalburg

== External links / Further reading ==
- Portgordon Community Harbour Group Ltd
- Port Gordon, The Life and Times of a Village, Peter H. Reid
- The Moray Coast: From Cullen to Culbin Through Time, Jenny Main, Amberley Publishing Limited, Oct 16, 2013.
- Ordnance Survey maps 25 inch, Banff Sheet I.12 (Rathven), Survey date: 1870, Published: 1872
- Ordnance Survey maps 25 inch, Banffshire 001.16 & 15 (includes: Bellie; Rathven), Published: 1905 Revised: 1902
