= Moray Way =

Footpath in the Scottish Highlands

The Moray Way
- logo
- Length: 160 km (99 mi)
- Location: Scottish Highlands
- Established: 2009; 17 years ago
- Use: Hiking
- Elevation gain/loss: 850 metres (2,790 ft)
- Maintained by: Moray Way Association
- Website: https://www.morayways.org.uk/routes/the-moray-way/

The Moray Way is a long-distance path in the Scottish Highlands. First conceived in 2009, the Way is an amalgam of three of Scotland's Great Trails. It combines the whole of The Dava Way, two-thirds of The Moray Coast Trail and approximately half of The Speyside Way to create a loop of a 160 kilometres (99 mi). These sections embody vivid contrasts between the wildness of Dava Moor, the grandeur of the southern Moray Firth Coast, and the serenity of the beautiful Spey Valley.

Each year, various ultramarathons are run on the Way, including The Moray Way 100 that circles the entire route.

== See also ==
- Dava Way
- Moray Coast Trail
- Speyside Way
