= Peter Mackenzie (disambiguation) =

Peter Mackenzie (born 1961) is an American actor.

Peter Mackenzie may also refer to:

- Peter Samuel George Mackenzie (1862–1914), Canadian lawyer and politician
- Peter MacKenzie (moderator) (1811–1890), Scottish minister

== See also ==
- Peter McKenzie, various people
