= List of crossings of the River Spey =

== List of crossings of the River Spey ==
Category	Heritage Status Criteria
A	Buildings of national or international importance, either architectural or historic, or fine little-altered examples of some particular period, style or building type.
B	Buildings of regional or more than local importance, or major examples of some particular period, style or building type which may have been altered.
C	Buildings of local importance, lesser examples of any period, style, or building type, as originally constructed or moderately altered; and simple traditional buildings which group well with others in categories A and B.

Crossing	Date	Coordinates	Heritage status	Locality	Notes	Photo
Footbridge near Melgarve		57.02518°N 4.53444°W	-			Footbridge_over_the_Spey_-_geograph.org.uk_-_7171651
Garva Bridge	1732	57.02012°N 4.43652°W	A			A_warm_spring_day_at_Garva_Bridge_-_geograph.org.uk_-_1557159
Footbridge		57.0136°N 4.38569°W	-	Sherramore		Bridge_over_River_Spey_at_Sherramore_-_geograph.org.uk_-_1347842
Spey Dam		57.01117°N 4.33666°W	-			Spey_Dam_-_geograph.org.uk_-_6306724
Service Bridge		57.01216°N 4.33302°W	-			Temporary_bridge_crossing_the_River_Spey_-_geograph.org.uk_-_5874570
Bridge near Spey Dam		57.01234°N 4.33242°W	-			Bridge_crossing_the_River_Spey_-_geograph.org.uk_-_5874566
Laggan Bridge	1985	57.01868°N 4.2838°W	-	Laggan	Abutments of earlier bridge remain	Laggan_Bridge_-_geograph.org.uk_-_5788051
Newtonmore Bridge	1926	57.05509°N 4.13042°W	B	Newtonmore		Spey_Bridge_-_geograph.org.uk_-_5109190
Newtonmore Rail Bridge		57.05456°N 4.12574°W	-	Highland Main Line		Railway bridge across the River Spey near Newtonmore (geograph 7851723)
Ruthven Bridge		57.07228°N 4.04734°W	-	Kingussie		Ruthven_Bridge_-_geograph.org.uk_-_1445080
A9 Bridge		57.07907°N 4.03974°W	-	A9		A9_bridge_over_the_Spey,_Kingussie_-_geograph.org.uk_-_6926699
Boat of Insh Bridge	Late 19th Cent	57.12632°N 3.92567°W	B	Kincraig		Kincraig_Bridge_-_geograph.org.uk_-_2462124
Aviemore Bridge		57.18172°N 3.82963°W	-	Aviemore		The_B970_bridging_the_Spey_-_geograph.org.uk_-_3642167
Footbridge		57.18284°N 3.82965°W	-	Aviemore		The B970 crosses the River Spey
Garten Bridge		57.25035°N 3.74759°W	-	Boat of Garten		Garten_Bridge_-_geograph.org.uk_-_5377118
Strathspey Railway Bridge		57.27278°N 3.69025°W	-	Nethy Bridge	Dismantled	Bridge Pillars
Broomhill Bridge		57.28077°N 3.66545°W	-	Broomhill		Broomhill Bridge, River Spey
New Spey Bridge	1931	57.32155°N 3.60606°W	B	Grantown		New Spey Bridge (geograph 7631721)
Old Spey Bridge	1754	57.3174°N 3.59602°W	A	Grantown		Old Spey Bridge, Grantown
Cromdale Bridge		57.34154°N 3.5534°W	-	Cromdale		Road_bridge_over_the_River_Spey_at_Cromdale_-_geograph.org.uk_-_5765751
Spey Bridge Of Advie	1922	57.39992°N 3.46551°W	B	Advie		The Bridge at Advie
Railway Bridge, River Spey, Ballindalloch	1863	57.41393°N 3.38547°W	A	Strathspey Railway		Bridge carrying the Speyside Way at Cragganmore
Blacksboat Bridge		57.43387°N 3.3594°W	-	Ballindalloch		Blacksboat Bridge
Bridge Of Carron	1863	57.45417°N 3.29399°W	A	Carron	Originally carried Strathspey Railway	Carron Bridge
Victoria Bridge	1902	57.47042°N 3.2317°W	A	Aberlour	Suspension	Victoria Bridge
Telford Bridge	1814	57.49135°N 3.19389°W	A	Craigellachie		Craigellachie_Bridge,_Highlands,_Scotland_-_geograph.org.uk_-_5008122
Craigellachie Bridge		57.49121°N 3.19174°W	-	Craigellachie		Traffic_on_the_new_Craigellachie_Bridge_-_geograph.org.uk_-_5843836
Morayshire Railway Bridge		57.49292°N 3.18354°W	-	Morayshire Railway	Dismantled	Railway_Relics_-_geograph.org.uk_-_6072763
B9103 Bridge	1956	57.55052°N 3.14063°W	-			Boat o' Brig
Railway Bridge, Boat O' Brig	1858	57.55111°N 3.14021°W	B	Aberdeen to Inverness Line		Boat O' Brig Railway Bridge over River Spey (geograph 7938903)
Fochabers Bridge	1806	57.62013°N 3.10637°W	A	Fochabers		From Fochabers Bridge (geograph 7849798)
A96 Bridge		57.62039°N 3.10602°W	-	A96		River_Spey_in_Spate_(1)_-_geograph.org.uk_-_1473590
Spey Viaduct, Garmouth	1886	57.66276°N 3.09808°W	B	Great North of Scotland Railway	Bridge partially collapsed 14 December 2025.	Spey Viaduct
