= Patrick Moir Barnett =

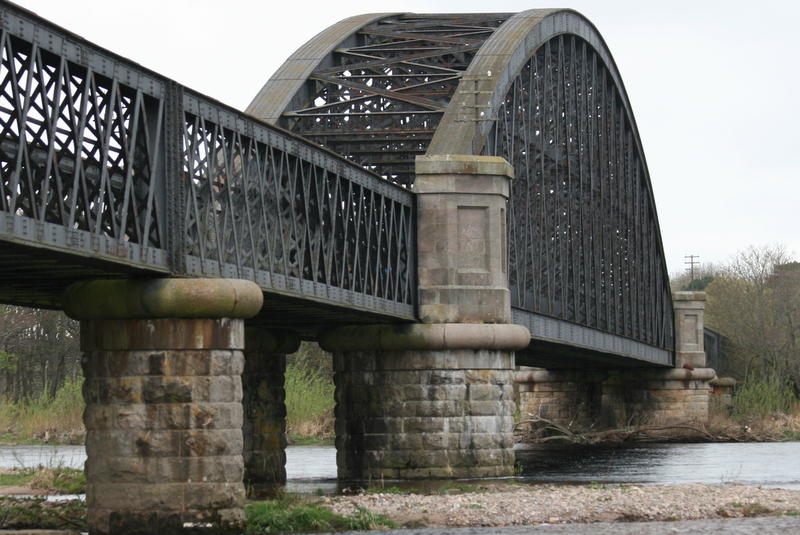
The Spey Viaduct

Patrick Moir Barnett MICE (1837-1915) was Chief Engineer of the Great North of Scotland Railway from 1867 to 1906.

== Career ==
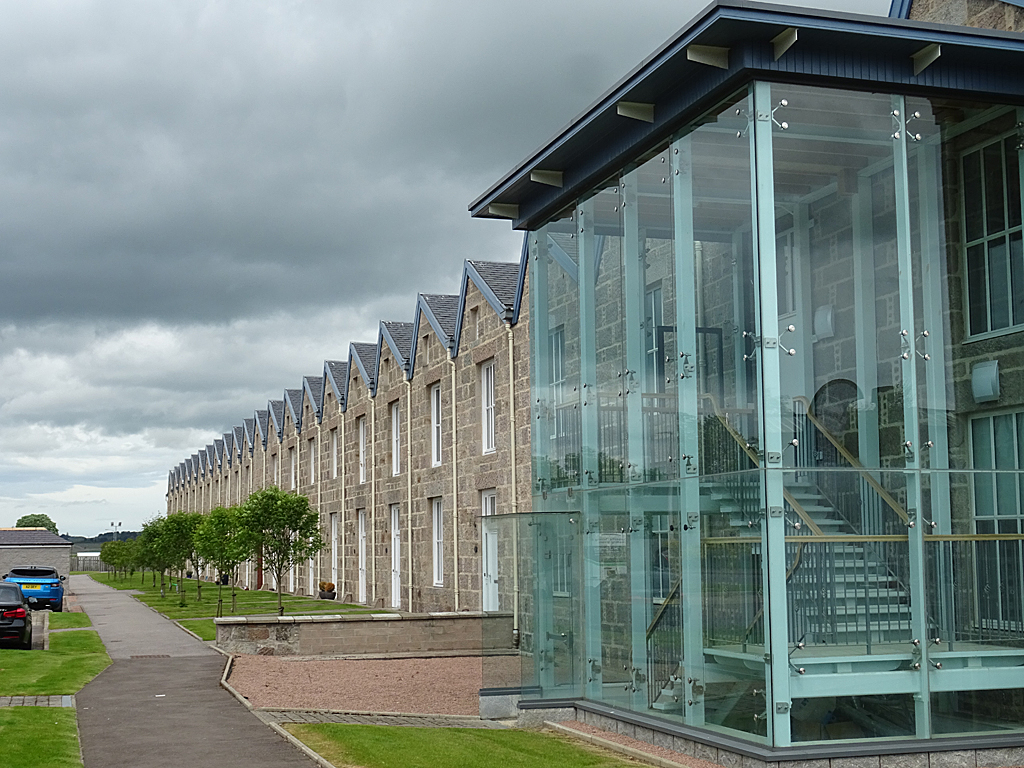
The former locomotive works at Inverurie built in 1902

He trained as an engineer with Alexander Gibb and Son and gained experience in building railways in Scotland including the Buchan and Strathspey Railways. He then went to Tunbridge Wells to take charge of the construction of new waterworks, and when the company won the contract to provide woterworks for Aberdeen, he returned north.

In 1867 he succeeded Mr. Fraser as engineer to the Great North of Scotland Railway and during this time he designed and supervised the construction of extensions and improvements including the extension to Macduff (1872), construction of the Moray Coast Railway from Elgin to Portsoy (1884-1886). This involved very heavy viaducts and large bridges one of the most important being the Spey Viaduct at Garmouth (1883-1886).

Afterwards the mainline between Aberdeen and Kintore was doubled (1879-1880) and later onto Keith, and on the Deeside branch the line as far as Culter was also doubled. This involved the widening of all the bridges in the districts affects, and the re-arrangement of the stations to bring them up to modern requirements.

In 1870 he designed a scheme to provide better protection for passengers at Aberdeen General station. The width of the station building was about 100 feet (30 m), and each end was enclosed down from the top for some distance, the bottom of the screen taking an arched shape. The works brought the screen 23 feet (7.0 m) lower at the centre and 17 feet (5.2 m) down at the sides, leaving it at a height of 12 feet (3.7 m) from the platform. The work cost £530 (equivalent to £54,544 in 2025).

In 1897 the Boddam branch line which he had designed was opened for traffic. He also provided new locomotive works at Inverurie which opened in 1902.

He was elected a Member of the Institution of Civil Engineers on 2 December 1879.

He was the first president of the Aberdeen Engineers’ Association from 1900.

== Life ==
He was born on 26 January 1837 at Nigg, Aberdeenshire, the son of William Barnett (1796-1882), schoolmaster and registrar, and Margaret Main (1807-1869), and baptised on 5 February 1837.

He married Catherine Elizabeth Alice Gray (1852-1918) on 14 October 1873 in Old Machar, Aberdeen and they had five children:

- William Barnett (b. 1876)
- Arthur Barnett (b. 1878)
- Patrick M Barnett (b. 1880)
- Isabella G Barnett (b. 1883)
- Edward P Barnett (b. 1890)

He was an elder in the East United Free Church in Aberdeen.

He died on 6 January 1915 at his home at 2 Westfield Terrace, Aberdeen and was buried in St Nicholas’ Churchyard.

Business positions
Preceded by Alexander Fraser	Chief Engineer of the Great North of Scotland Railway; 1867-1906	Succeeded by James Alexander Parker
