= Calcots railway station =

Disused railway station in Scotland

Calcots

General information
- Location: Calcots, Moray; Scotland
- Coordinates: 57.661783°N 3.249201°W
- Grid reference: NJ 2558 6421
- Platforms: 2

Other information
- Status: Disused

History
- Pre-grouping: Great North of Scotland Railway
- Post-grouping: London and North Eastern Railway

Key dates
- 12 August 1884: station opened
- 6 May 1968: Closed
Location

Calcots railway station was a railway station in the parish of St Andrews-Lhanbryd, Moray. The railway station was opened by the Great North of Scotland Railway (GNoSR) on its Moray Firth coast line in 1884, served by Aberdeen to Elgin trains. It served a rural area rather than a discrete settlement and closed to regular passenger traffic on 6 May 1968 on the same date as the line itself.

In 1923 the GNoSR became part of the London and North Eastern Railway and at nationalisation in 1948 became part of British Railways. The line was recommended for closure in Dr Beeching's report "The Reshaping of British Railways" and closed to all traffic on 6 May 1968.

== History ==
=== Background ===
In 1881 the Great North of Scotland Railway put a bill to parliament to extend its Portsoy line along the Moray Firth as far as Buckie. In 1882 the Great North of Scotland applied for permission to build a 25 1/4-mile (40.6 km) line from Portsoy following the coast to Buckie and then running on to Elgin.

=== Great North of Scotland Railway ===
The GNoSR station opened as Calcots on 12 August 1884, served by through Aberdeen to Elgin trains. In 1923 the Great North of Scotland Railway was absorbed by the London and North Eastern Railway. This company was nationalised in 1948 and services were then provided by British Railways until closure. As stated, the station and line were recommended for closure by Dr Beeching in his report "The Reshaping of British Railways" and closed in 1968.

== Services ==
This GNoSR station was served by through trains between Aberdeen to Elgin. There were no Sunday services.

== The station infrastructure ==
Calcots station had two platforms with the typical wooden station buildings found at many of the stations on the line. The goods yard had more sidings than most of the stations on the line, reflecting the actual or expected agricultural traffic, with a goods shed and several points that allowed for interchange between the goods shed and the loading docks, etc. The station had a neat and compact appearance with a typical footbridge, two signal boxes and several flower beds with what may be an enclosed fruit garden.

The station was host to a LNER camping coach from 1935 to 1936 and possibly one for some of 1934.

The Moray Coast line was predominantly single track apart from a double track section between Buckie and Portessie. Track lifting took place shortly after closure in 1968. The station was demolished and only a part of one of the platforms survived in 2005.

Preceding station	Historical railways	Following station
Elgin	Great North of Scotland	Urquhart
