= Portgordon railway station =

Former railway station in Scotland

Portgordon
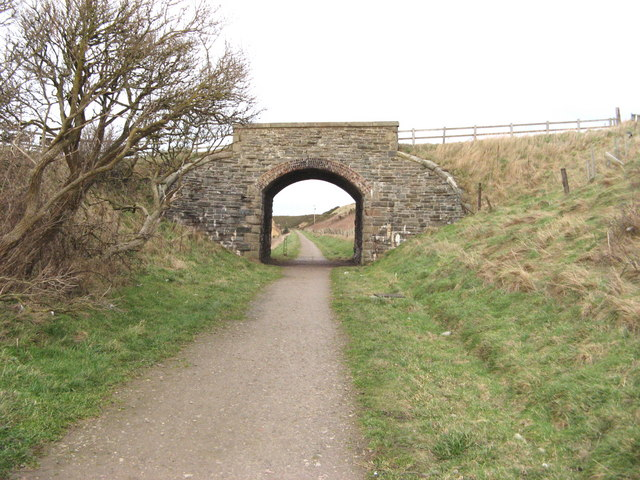
- An overbridge near the site of Portgordon station

General information
- Location: Portgordon, Moray; Scotland
- Coordinates: 57.663°N 3.018°W
- Grid reference: NJ 3935 6414
- Platforms: 1

Other information
- Status: Disused

History
- Pre-grouping: Great North of Scotland Railway
- Post-grouping: London and North Eastern Railway

Key dates
- 1 May 1886: Great North of Scotland station opened
- 6 May 1968: Closed
Location

Portgordon railway station was a railway station in Portgordon in Moray, Scotland. The railway station was opened by the Great North of Scotland Railway (GNoSR) on its Moray Firth coast line in 1886, served by Aberdeen to Elgin trains. In 1923 the GNoSR became part of the London and North Eastern Railway (LNER) and at nationalisation in 1948 became part of British Railways. The station was named Port Gordon railway station until 1938 when it was renamed 'Portgordon' by the LNER.

The line was recommended for closure by Dr Beeching's report "The Reshaping of British Railways". Both the line and the station closed to regular passenger traffic on 6 May 1968. A photograph of 1968 shows a name board with 'Port Gordon' clearly displayed.

== History ==
=== Background ===
In 1881 the Great North of Scotland Railway (GNoSR) put forward a bill to parliament to extend its Portsoy line along the Moray Firth as far as Buckie. In 1882 the GNoSR applied for permission to build a 25 1/4-mile (40.6 km) line from Portsoy following the coast to Buckie and then running on to Elgin.

=== Great North of Scotland Railway ===
The GNoSR station opened as Port Gordon on 1 May 1886 with the central section of the coast line, served by through Aberdeen to Elgin trains. In 1923 the GNoSR was absorbed by the London and North Eastern Railway. This was nationalised in 1948, and services provided by British Railways. The station and line were recommended for closure in Dr Beeching's report "The Reshaping of British Railways" and closed on 6 May 1968.

== Services ==
The GNoSR station was served by through trains running between Aberdeen and Elgin. There were no Sunday services.

== Station infrastructure ==
Portgordon station had a single platform with a wooden station building and a wooden storage building next to it. In 1915 it was improved and the platform extended in length. The 1903 Ordnance Survey map shows a small goods shed and two sidings, one lying behind the passenger platform.

The line was predominantly single track, apart from a double track section between Buckie and Portessie. The track was lifted soon after closure in 1968. The station site is now a small park and a bowling green.

== Operation Sea Lion and the German spies ==
In September 1940, three German spies named Werner Walti, Vera Eriksen and Karl Drucke were landed by seaplane. After coming ashore in a dinghy, Eriksen and Drucke walked to Portgordon railway station, arriving at about 7.30 am and intending to catch the train. John Geddes was the porter and John Donald the stationmaster at the time. The two strangers had to ask the name of the station, as no name board was displayed during the war, and this aroused suspicion, as well as their wet clothes and shoes, and Drucke indicating to the name Forres station on the timetable which he pronounced as "Forrest". Upon payment Drucke displayed a wallet that was bulging with banknotes and tried to pay with far too large a denomination note.

Stationmaster Donald phoned the local policeman. When he saw that the strangers' identity cards had no immigration stamp, and had a continental style of writing, the game was up and the two were arrested. The third spy, Werner Walti, had gone to Buckpool railway station and was eventually arrested in Edinburgh after making several equally suspicious errors.

The trio had intended to spy on the military facilities in the area, especially the airfields, in preparation for the German invasion of the United Kingdom, code named 'Operation Sea Lion'.

Preceding station	Historical railways	Following station
Spey Bay	Great North of Scotland	Buckpool
