= Buckpool (disambiguation) =

Buckpool is a village in Moray, Scotland.

Buckpool may also refer to:

== Scotland ==
- Buckpool railway station, a former railway station in Buckpool near Buckie
- Buckpool Golf Club, in Buckie, Moray

== England ==
- Buckpool, Dudley, West Midlands
  - Buckpool School, former name of The Wordsley School, West Midlands
  - Buckpool, in Buckpool and Fens Pool Local Nature Reserve

== See also ==
- Buckie, a burgh town on the Moray Firth coast of Scotland
