= Moray Coast Trail =

Footpath in Moray, Scotland

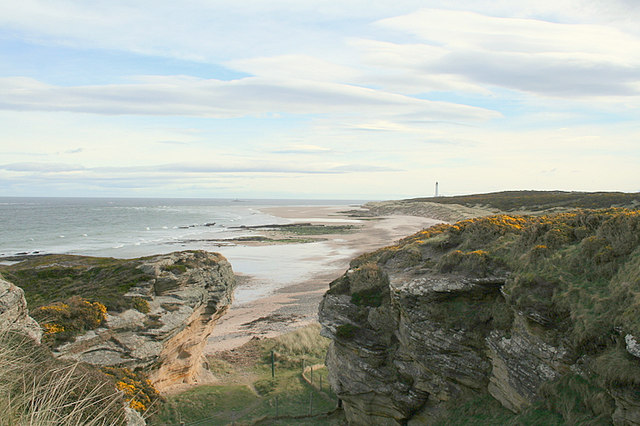
- The Moray Coastal Trail at Covesea.
- Length: 72 km (45 mi)
- Location: Moray, Scotland
- Designation: Scotland's Great Trails
- Trailheads: Forres 57.610°N 3.612°W; Cullen 57.691°N 2.819°W
- Use: Walking
- Elevation gain/loss: 410 metres (1,350 ft) gain.
- Season: All Year
- Waymark: Yes
- Website: www.morayways.org.uk/routes/the-moray-coast-trail/
Trail map

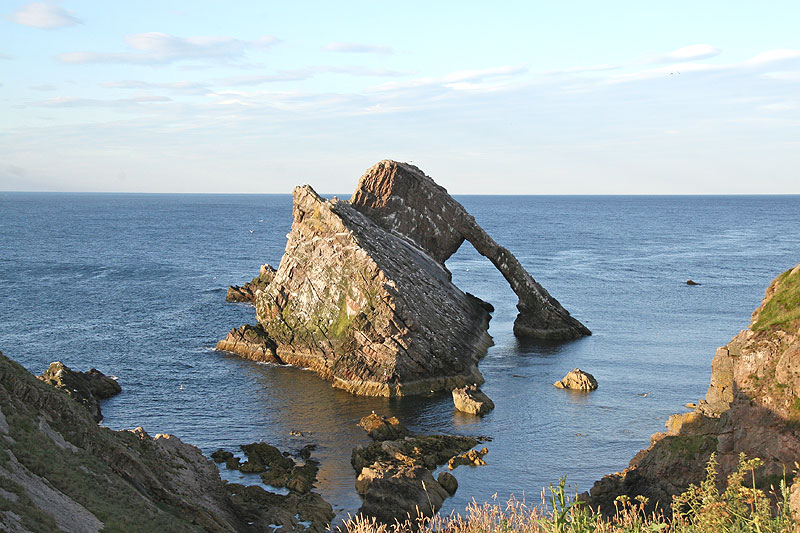
Bow Fiddle Rock at Portknockie

The Moray Coastal Trail is a long-distance path in North-East Scotland that runs along the coastline of the Moray council area. The route, which is 72 km (45 mi) long, runs between Forres and Cullen. It is designated as one of Scotland's Great Trails by NatureScot, and connects with two further Great Trails: the Speyside Way at Spey Bay, and the Dava Way at Forres. The Moray Coast Trail can be combined with sections of these two routes to form a 153 km (95 mi) circular route known as the Moray Way, and forms part of the North Sea Trail via the Moray Firth Trail. The trail is primarily intended for walkers, but many sections are also suitable for cycling and horseriding. An alternative route for cycling, the Moray Coast Ride, shares some sections of path with the Moray Coast Trail, and forms part of the National Cycle Network's Route 1. About 23,000 people use the path every year, of whom about 1,000 complete the entire route.

The Scotland's Great Trails website recommends that the trail be walked west to east (from Forres to Cullen), due to the direction of the prevailing winds. In this direction, the following settlements are passed: Forres, Kinloss, Findhorn, Burghead, Hopeman, Lossiemouth, Spey Bay, Portgordon, Buckie, Findochty, Portknockie, Cullen. Places of note along the route are the Covesea Skerries Lighthouse and Bow Fiddle Rock.

The trail was severed when the Spey Viaduct collapsed on 14 December 2025.
