= Upper Dallachy =

Village in Moray, Scotland

Coordinates: 57.650°N 3.069°W

Upper Dallachy: Scottish Gaelic: Dalachaidh Uarach
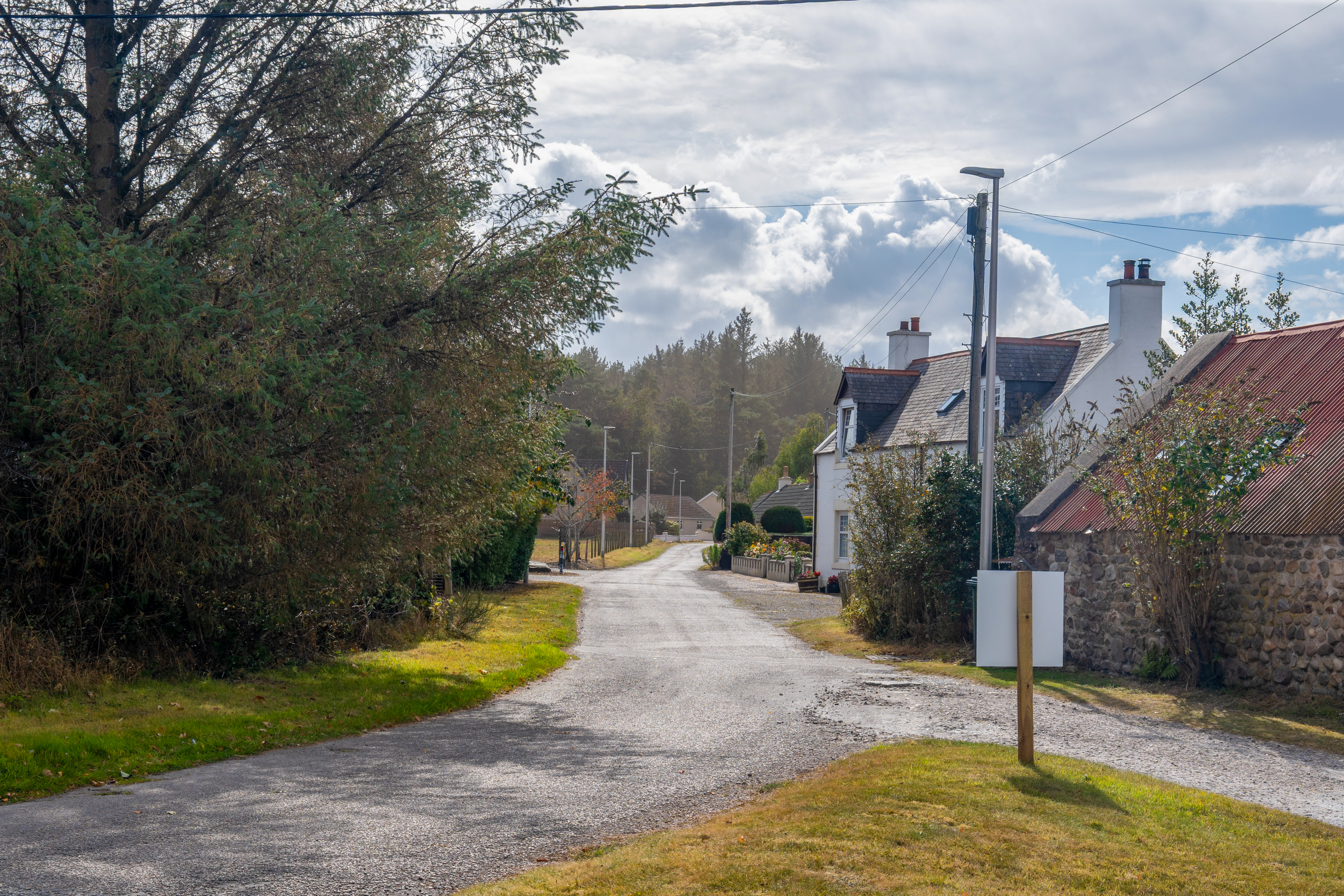

- Location within Moray
- OS grid reference: NJ3662
- Council area: Moray
- Lieutenancy area: Moray
- Country: Scotland
- Sovereign state: United Kingdom
- Police: Scotland
- Fire: Scottish
- Ambulance: Scottish
- UK Parliament: Moray
- Scottish Parliament: Moray; Highlands and Islands

Upper Dallachy is a small village in Moray, Scotland, about 2 miles (3.2 km) south-east of Spey Bay. It is situated on the east of the River Spey.

The village is located next to the now-abandoned RAF Dallachy airfield, which was used frequently in the Second World War and was the site of a number of bombings.
