= Nether Dallachy =

Village in Moray, Scotland

Coordinates: 57.66040627006°N 3.074221452503°W

Nether Dallachy: Scottish Gaelic: Dalachaidh Iarach
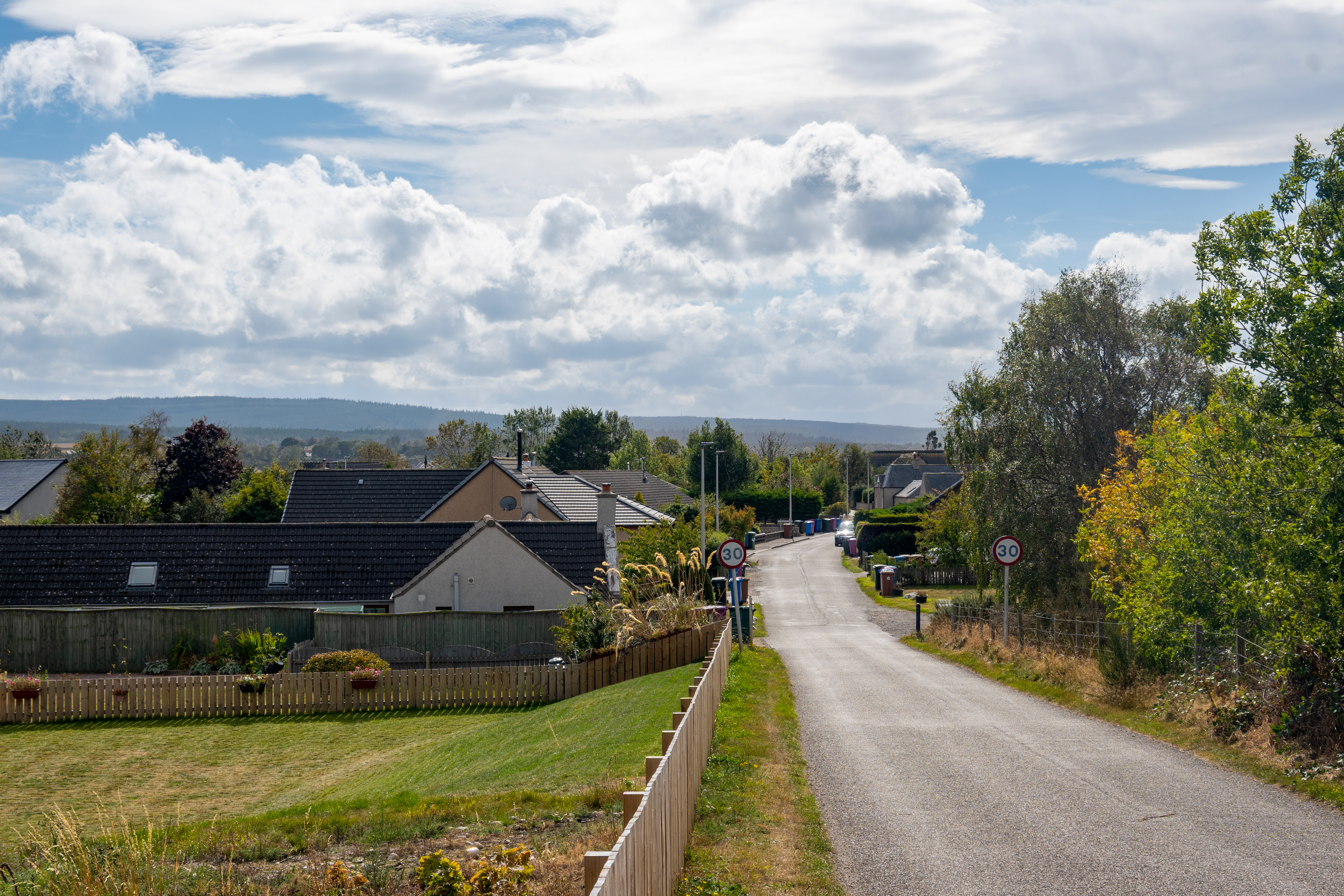
- Nether Dallachy

- Location within Moray
- OS grid reference: NJ3664
- Council area: Moray
- Lieutenancy area: Moray
- Country: Scotland
- Sovereign state: United Kingdom
- Police: Scotland
- Fire: Scottish
- Ambulance: Scottish

Nether Dallachy is a small village in Moray, Scotland located about 0.8 miles (1.5 kilometres) south-east of Spey Bay. It is situated on the east of the River Spey.

It is located next to the now-abandoned RAF Dallachy airfield, which was used frequently in the Second World War and was the site of a number of bombings.
