= Urquhart, Moray =

Coordinates: 57°38′58″N 3°11′44″W

Urquhart: Scottish Gaelic: Urchard
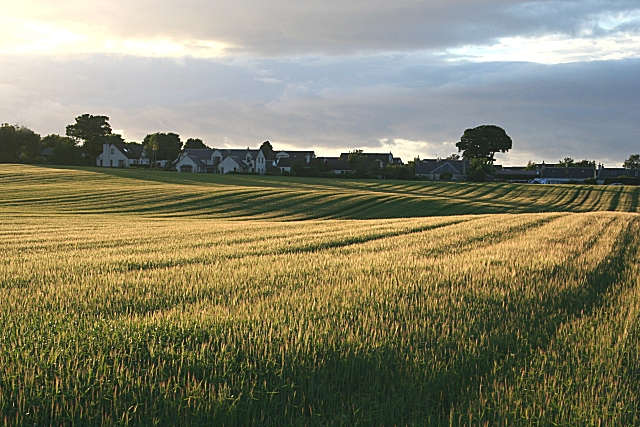
- Urquhart at sunset

- Location within Moray
- Population: 420 (2001)
- OS grid reference: NJ285626
- Council area: Moray
- Lieutenancy area: Moray
- Country: Scotland
- Sovereign state: United Kingdom
- Post town: ELGIN
- Postcode district: IV30
- Police: Scotland
- Fire: Scottish
- Ambulance: Scottish
- UK Parliament: Moray
- Scottish Parliament: Moray

Urquhart (/ˈɜːrkərt/ UR-kərt; Scottish Gaelic: Urchard) is a small village in Moray, Scotland. It is approximately 5 miles (8 km) east of Elgin, and one mile NE of the larger village of Lhanbryde. It is just over 1 mile north of the main A96 road connecting Elgin and Keith, and about 2 miles south of the Moray Firth coast. Urquhart had a population of 420 (as of the 2001 census).

== Barony of Urquhart history ==
Mary Queen of Scots, the Dowager Queen of France, in 1561 rewarded her trusted friend and most loyal supporter George Seton, 7th Lord Seton with the stewardship of the estates of Pluscarden Priory. Four years later, she gave the Priory to his son, her godson, Alexander Seton. During the troubled years that followed, the Setons lost possession, but they regained control in 1581 when Alexander was appointed Commendator of the priory. They retained it six years later, when the monastery was dissolved and its rich lands, scattered across the southern plains of Moray Firth from the approaches to Castle Urquhart in the west to Urquhart-on-Spey in the east, were erected into a barony for him, providing him with the title of Urquhart when he became Lord of Session the following year. Subsequently, Lord Urquhart, 1st Baron of Urquhart was created Lord Fyvie in the Peerage of Scotland, and he was later created Earl of Dunfermline. In 1605, he was appointed Lord Chancellor of Scotland, a post he held until his death in 1622. Since that time the feudal Barony of Urquhart has been passed by inheritance and through land acquisition many times. The current and 19th Baron of Urquhart is Robert A. Cromartie of Urquhart-on-Spey, FSA (Scot).

== Village of Urquhart history ==
In farmland to the north of the village lies the a small but well-preserved stone circle near which flint and stone implements of Neolithic age have been found, as well as some fine gold armlets. An important Bronze Age or early Iron Age hoard was found at Law Farm near Urquhart in the 19th century. It comprised a group of 36 or 37 gold ribbon torcs (neck rings); the remaining 10 collars are now in the collections of the British Museum, the National Museum of Scotland and the Marischal Museum in Aberdeen.

In 1125 David I, King of Scots, founded a priory, as a cell of the Benedictine Dunfermline Abbey, on low ground just to the ENE of the village. This was an attempt to "introduce civilisation" to the local native population of Celts. However in 1454 the Benedictines abandoned the priory, moving instead to Pluscarden Abbey, SW of Elgin, after the merger of the two had been agreed by a bull of Pope Nicholas V. The buildings soon started to fall into disrepair and decay; by 1654 the site had become a ruin, and the remaining building materials were removed to be used in the construction of a granary in the nearby village of Garmouth and in the repair of the manse and churchyard wall.

The first reference to a church in Urquhart, which was dedicated to Saint Margaret, appears in a deed of 1237. This church fell into disrepair early in the 19th century, and in 1843 it was replaced with the building of a new parish church on Gashill just to the north of the village. At around the same time, the remains of the original church were used to build a new Free Church of Scotland church at the east end of the village. In 1938 the two churches were united, and in the mid-1940s St. Margaret's Free Church and the manse were sold and the proceeds used to refurbish the St. Margaret's Church Hall. Two beautiful stained glass windows from the Free Church building, and a Celtic Cross, thought to have come from the priory, were incorporated into the building. In 1988 the parish church was closed and united with Saint Andrew's Church in the neighbouring parish of Lhanbryde. With the closure the communion table, baptismal font, and several chairs were placed in St Margaret's Hall. The parish church and manse were sold, the former now converted to a bed and breakfast while St. Margaret's Hall was used as the village place of worship, with services being held there on the last Sunday of each month at 7 pm. In 2024 the hall was put up for sale.

In 1884 a station was opened in Urquhart on the Great North of Scotland Railway (GNSR) Moray Coast line. This made the village more attractive as a place to live for people working elsewhere along the railway line, especially in Elgin. The railway line was closed in 1968 as a result of the Beeching Axe.

== Economy ==
The village remains an attractive place to live for people working in Elgin and elsewhere in the local area. Whilst the village did benefit from a small shop and public house (The Royal Oak) at one time, these have both closed and there are no services within the village as of 2018.

== Notable people ==
- Very Rev John MacDonald Gaelic Moderator of the Free Church of Scotland in 1845
- Very Rev Peter MacKenzie minister from 1844 to 1890, Moderator of the General Assembly of the Church of Scotland in 1884

== See also ==
- Urquhart railway station
