= Loch Spey =

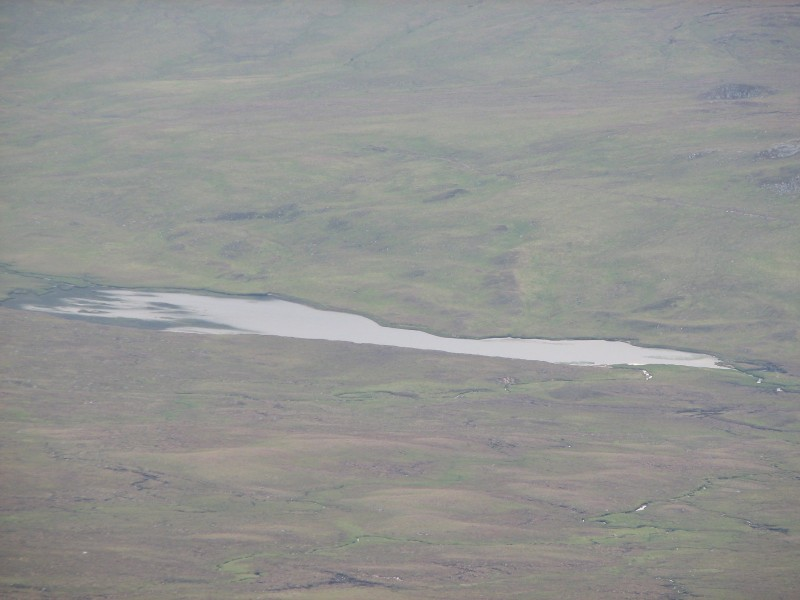

- Location within Highland
- Location: Highland, Scotland
- Coordinates: 57°0′28″N 4°36′15″W grid reference NN419937)
- Type: freshwater loch, lake
- Primary outflows: River Spey
- Basin countries: Scotland
- Max. length: 300 m (980 ft)
- Max. width: 200 m (660 ft)
- Surface area: 0.068 km^{2} (0.026 sq mi)
- Surface elevation: 350 m (1,150 ft)
- Settlements: Newtonmore, Melgarve.

Loch Spey is a small freshwater loch located in the Central Highlands of Scotland. This loch is significant because it forms the headwaters of the powerful River Spey. It is small, only 300 m (980 ft) long by 200 m (660 ft) wide and is shallow with many weed beds. It is located 28.9 km (18.0 mi) west of Newtonmore and 5 km (3.1 mi) from Melgarve. Loch Spey is approximately 20 km (12 mi) up from the Spey Dam and 186 km (116 mi) from the North Sea.

The loch has native fish, including trout and minnows.
