= James Alexander Parker =

James Alexander Parker MICE BSc (1864-1946) was Chief Engineer of the Great North of Scotland Railway from 1906.

== Career ==
After education at Glasgow University from 1881 to 1885 where he won first prize in the Senior Engineering classes and graduated with a BSc in Engineering Science, he was an articled pupil to John Strain MICE in Glasgow engaged in the design and construction of railways where he gained experience on construction works on the Killin Railway, Tharsis railway line, Caledonian Railway, Lanarkshire Lines, Lanarkshire and Ayrshire Railway and the Ardrossan Harbour Extensions. In 1889 he moved to John Strain's Westminster office and on completion of his articles was appointed his assistant.

In 1890 he entered the office of Bateman, Parsons and Strain, Westminster where he undertook work in relation to the City of Buenos Ayres Water Supply and Drainage.

He was admitted as a student of the Institution of Civil Engineers on 2 March 1886 and a full member on 3 October 1890

After leaving John Strain, in 1892 he was site engineer for the Barnton Branch (Caledonian Railway) and until 1896 the site engineer for the Partick section of the Lanarkshire and Dumbartonshire Railway.

He was assistant engineer in charge of new works for the South Eastern and Chatham Railway and in 1906 was involved in the design of the roof of Charing Cross railway station after the collapse of the previous structure. He also worked on the designs to widen the lines between Charing Cross and Chislehurst.

In 1906 he was appointed Chief Engineer of the Great North of Scotland Railway, succeeding Patrick Moir Barnett.

In 1909 he was engaged in a scheme costing £3,700 (equivalent to £380,782 in 2025) to widen Fullerton Road bridge at Woodside in Aberdeen, lengthening it from 25 feet (7.6 m) to 100 feet (30 m) and widening the roadway from 25 feet (7.6 m) to 40 feet (12 m) but this scheme was delayed by several years.

In 1911 he introduced steam haulage on Aberdeen Quays using a specially built locomotive which could haul twelve wagons at a greater speed than horses. Prior to this innovation, two horses could put just three wagons.

In 1912 under his supervision work started on a £180,000 (equivalent to £17,776,059 in 2025) rebuild of Aberdeen Joint railway station by the contractors Anderson of Glasgow.

In 1923 he became local engineer for the London and North Eastern Railway. He retired in 1926.

== Life ==
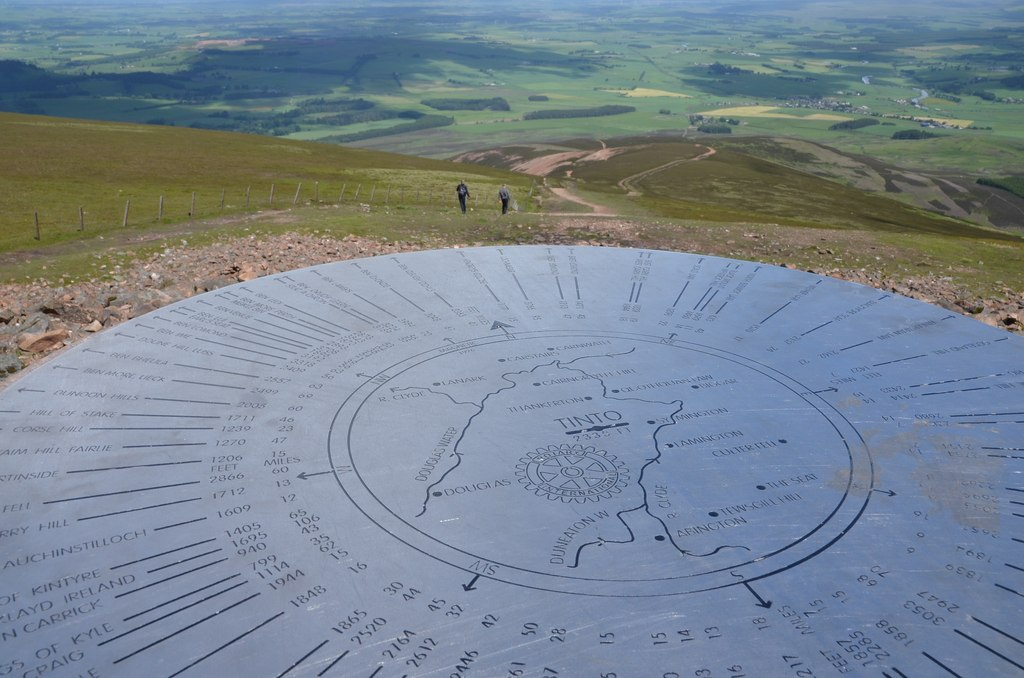
The toposcope at Tinto summit

He was born on 21 September 1864 in Shettleston, Lanark, the son of William Parker and Mary Hamilton.

He was educated at Glasgow University.

He was a keen mountaineer and during climbing holidays in Switzerland he studied Basel station which provided inspiration for the later rebuild of Aberdeen Joint station. His engineering skills were also used during his mountaineering in Scotland, where he provided toposcopes on Tinto, Lochnagar and Ben Macdui and the viewfinder on Blue Hill at the southern edge of Aberdeen. He is recorded as the third person to have completed all of the Munros in Scotland having started with the most southerly, Ben Lomond, on 19 July 1883, and completed the most northerly, Ben Hope, on 19 July 1927. He was president of the Scottish Mountaineering Club and in 1945, Honorary President of the Cairngorm Club.

He was also a director of the Aberdeen Mechanics' Institution until its demise in 1925.

He died on 28 September 1946 at home at 76 Rubislaw Den, Aberdeen.

Business positions
Preceded by Patrick Moir Barnett	Chief Engineer of the Great North of Scotland Railway; 1906-1923	Succeeded by Post subsumed into LNER
