= Urquhart railway station =

Former railway station in Scotland

Urquhart
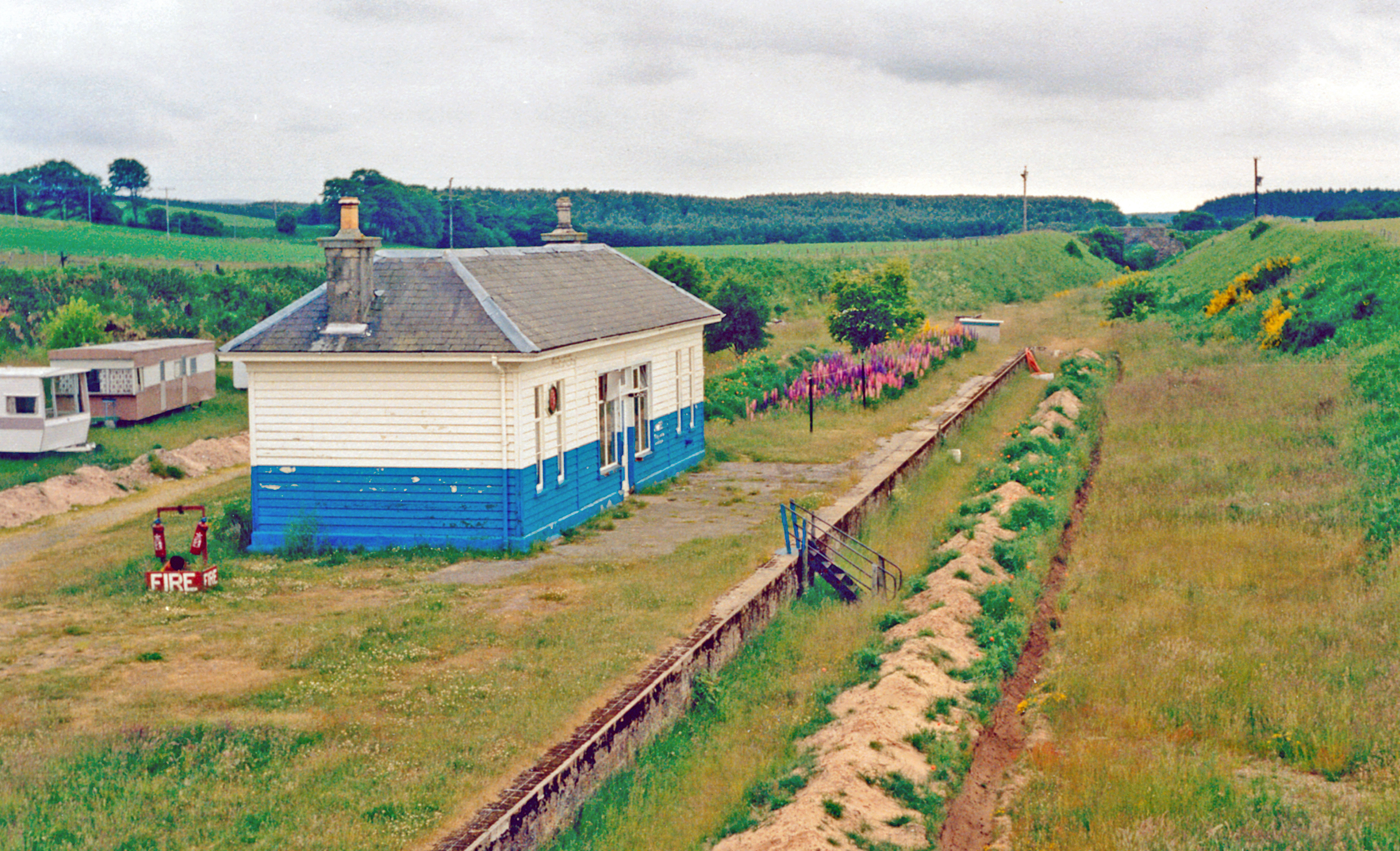
- The remains of Urquhart Station in 1988

General information
- Location: Urquhart, Moray; Scotland
- Coordinates: 57.651853°N 3.196080°W
- Grid reference: NJ 28747 63070
- Platforms: 1

Other information
- Status: Disused

History
- Pre-grouping: Great North of Scotland Railway
- Post-grouping: London and North Eastern Railway

Key dates
- 12 August 1884: station opened
- 6 May 1968: Closed
Location

Urquhart railway station was a railway station serving the village of Urquhart, parish of Urquhart, Moray. The railway station was opened by the Great North of Scotland Railway (GNoSR) on its Moray Firth coast line in 1884, served by Aberdeen to Elgin trains.

In 1923 the GNoSR became part of the London and North Eastern Railway and at nationalisation in 1948 became part of British Railways. The line was recommended for closure by Dr Beeching's report "The Reshaping of British Railways" and closed on 6 May 1968.

== History ==
=== Background ===
In 1881 the Great North of Scotland Railway put a bill to parliament to extend its Portsoy line along the Moray Firth as far as Buckie. In 1882 the Great North of Scotland applied for permission to build a 25 1/4-mile (40.6 km) line from Portsoy following the coast to Buckie and then running on to Elgin.

=== Great North of Scotland Railway ===
The GNoSR station opened as Urquhart on 12 August 1884, served by through Aberdeen to Elgin trains. In the 1923 Grouping, the Great North of Scotland Railway was absorbed by the London and North Eastern Railway. This company was nationalised in 1948, and services were then provided by British Railways. The station and line was recommended for closure by Dr Beeching in his report "The Reshaping of British Railways" and closed on 6 May 1968.

== Services ==
The GNoSR station was served by through trains between Aberdeen to Elgin. There were no Sunday services.

== The station infrastructure ==
Urquhart station had one platform with the typical wooden station buildings found at many of the stations on the line. A 'Station Cottage', a possible stationmaster's house sat near the entrance to the goods yard. The station goods yard had a goods shed that stood near the station building and three other sidings with a loading dock. A storage hut was located on the platform and in 1959 the platform flower beds were well tended and a number of possibly stored waggons stood in the yard. A shed stood incongruously just beyond the Garmouth end of the platform.

The Moray Coast line was predominantly single track apart from a double track section between Buckie and Portessie. Track lifting took place shortly after closure in 1968. The station site was used as a caravan site for a while, but the station has now been demolished and a private dwelling occupies the site with landscaped grounds.

Preceding station	Historical railways	Following station
Calcots	Great North of Scotland	Garmouth
