= Dava Way =

Trail in Moray, Scotland

- Logo of the Dava Way Association
- Length: 38 km (24 mi)
- Location: Moray & Highland, Scotland
- Established: 2005; 21 years ago
- Designation: Scotland’s Great Trails
- Trailheads: Grantown-on-Spey 57.331°N 3.608°W; Forres 57.598°N 3.615°W
- Use: walking and cycling
- Elevation gain/loss: 146 m (479 ft) gain
- Highest point: 321 m (1,053 ft)
- Season: all year
- Waymark: yes
- Website: www.davaway.org.uk
Trail map

The Dava Way is a 38 km (24 mi) long-distance path that mostly follows the route of the former Highland Railway between Grantown and Forres. The railway line, built as a route between Inverness and Perth, opened in 1863 and closed in 1965. The route was reopened as a long distance path in 2005. It is listed as one of Scotland's Great Trails by NatureScot, and links directly to two further Great Trails: the Moray Coast Trail and the Speyside Way. It is currently the shortest of the Great Trails, but can be combined with sections of the Moray Coast Trail and Speyside Way to form a 153 km (95 mi) circular route known as the Moray Way. About 5,000 people use the path every year, of whom about 400 complete the entire route.

== History ==
Although in 1860 Inverness had a rail link to the south via Aberdeen, this was circuitous and involved a change between two railway stations in the town. A more direct route south bypassing Aberdeen was planned leaving the Inverness to Aberdeen Line at Forres and heading south to Grantown and then via the Pass of Drumochter to Perth. Work started in 1861, with the line between Forres and Aviemore opening on 3 August before the complete line opened on 9 September 1863. The line was built and initially operated by Inverness & Perth Junction Railway, which became part of the Highland Railway in 1865. The line north of Aviemore was bypassed by the current more direct route via the Nairn Viaduct in 1898. In his 1963 report "The Reshaping of British Railways" Dr Beeching recommending closing the network's least used stations and lines, which included the line between Aviemore and Forres and this subsequently closed in 1965.

The Dava Way Association was formed in 1997 to create a walking and cycling path along the former railway. Negotiations and purchase of the former alignment were necessary before the clearing could start in 2003. The way was opened in 2005, although this at the time included a diversion along a minor road.

== Route ==
The 38.25 km (23.8 mi) long route from Grantown-on-Spey in the Cairngorms National Park to Forres in Moray mainly follows the old railway line. Starting from Grantown and heading north, the path crosses Dava Moor where it reaches its summit of 321 m (1,052 ft). Continuing to Dunphail, the River Divie is crossed by the old railway viaduct, used today as the symbol of the Dava Way. Between Dunphail and Forres a new bridge was installed in 2004 to cross the Altyre Burn.

== See also ==
- Formartine and Buchan Way
- Deeside Way
