= River Spey =

River in Scotland

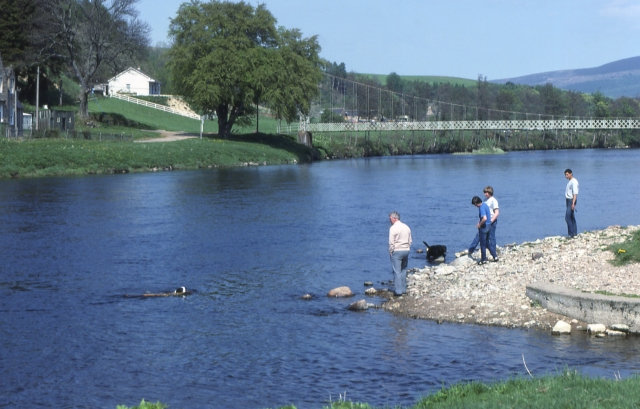
- The River Spey at Aberlour

Location
- Country: Scotland
- State: United Kingdom

Physical characteristics
- Source: Loch Spey
  - location: Roybridge, Scotland
  - coordinates: 57.00729°N 4.60499°W
  - elevation: 349 m (1,145 ft)
- Mouth: Moray Firth, Spey Bay
  - location: Fochabers, Scotland
  - coordinates: 57°40′34″N 3°06′00″W
  - elevation: 0 m (0 ft)
- Length: 98 mi (158 km)
- Basin size: 3,008 km^{2} (1,161 sq mi)
- Discharge
  - average: 64 m^{3}/s (2,300 cu ft/s)

Basin features
- Designation

Ramsar Wetland
- Official name: River Spey - Insh Marshes
- Designated: 2 February 1997
- Reference no.: 889

The River Spey (/speɪ/; Scottish Gaelic: Uisge Spè) is a river in the northeast of Scotland. At 107 mi (172 km) it is the ninth longest river in the United Kingdom and the third longest and fastest-flowing river in Scotland. It is an important location for the traditions of salmon fishing and whisky production in Scotland.

== Etymology ==
The origin of the name Spey is uncertain. A possible etymological genesis for the name Spey is Early Celtic *skwej-, meaning "thorn". Pictish etymology is often proposed, from a root similar to Welsh ysbyddad, meaning "hawthorn", though adjudged unlikely. One proposal is a derivation from a Pictish cognate of Old Gaelic sceïd, "vomit" (cf. Welsh chwydu), which is dubious both on phonological and semantic grounds. Ptolemy, in his Geography of mid 2nd century AD, only mentioned other rivers between 'Orkas Akron' (Duncansby Head) and 'Taizalon Akron' (Kinnaird Head or Rattray Head), they were Ἴλα/Ila (probably Ullie/River Helmsdale) (Gaelic Ilidh), Loxa (River Lossie), the estuary of Varar (River Farrar, River Beauly & Beauly Firth; in his sequence before the Loxa) and Tuesis (rather River Deveron), thereafter a Kelnios (which might be a reduction of 'Skelnios'), not to forget the Deva (River Dee) with the town of Devana, after Taizalon Akron. The name 'Spey' first appears in 1451.

== Course ==
The Spey is 107 miles (172 km) long. It rises at over 1,000 feet (300 m) at Loch Spey in Corrieyairack Forest in the Scottish Highlands, 10 miles (16 km) south of Fort Augustus. Some miles downstream from its source it is impounded by Spey Dam before continuing a descent through Newtonmore and Kingussie, crossing Loch Insh before reaching Aviemore, giving its name to Strathspey. From there it flows the remaining 60 miles (97 km) north-east to the Moray Firth, reaching the sea 5 miles (8 km) west of Buckie.

On some sections of its course, the Spey changes course frequently, either gradually as a result of deposition and erosion from normal flow, or in a matter of hours as a result of spate. The Spey spates quickly due to its wide mountainous catchment area as a result of rainfall or snow-melt.

Insh Marshes, an area of roughly two square miles (5 km^{2}) on either side of the Spey in its middle reaches are designated by Scottish Natural Heritage as a Site of Special Scientific Interest, as are the extensive shingle systems at Spey Bay.

== Tributaries ==
After leaving Loch Spey the river gathers numerous burns in the Corrieyarack, Sherramore and Glenshirra Forests. The first sizeable tributary is the Markie Burn which drops out of Glen Markie to the north to enter the waters of Spey impounded behind the Spey Dam. A further mile downstream the River Mashie enters from Strath Mashie to the south.

The River Truim enters on the right bank a couple of miles above Newtonmore and the Highland Calder enters from Glen Banchor on the left bank at Spey Bridge at Newtonmore. At Kingussie the Spey is joined on its left bank by the River Gynack which runs through the town and 1 1/2 miles (2.4 km) downstream it is joined by the River Tromie which enters on the right bank. The sizeable River Feshie joins on the right bank at Kincraig and the River Druie does likewise at Aviemore. Several miles downstream the River Nethy joins from the east near Nethy Bridge and the River Dulnain originating in the Monadhliath contributes a considerable flow from the west near Dulnain Bridge.

Between Grantown-on-Spey and Craigellachie, the Burn of Tulchan and Allt a Gheallaidh join from the west whilst the Spey's most important tributary, the River Avon joins from the east. The Allt Arder and Knockando Burn also join from the west near Knockando. The River Fiddich enters from the right at Craigellachie and the Burn of Rothes enters from the left at Rothes. Downstream more burns enter the Spey, the most important of which are the Burn of Mulben, Red Burn and Burn of Fochabers.

== Industry ==
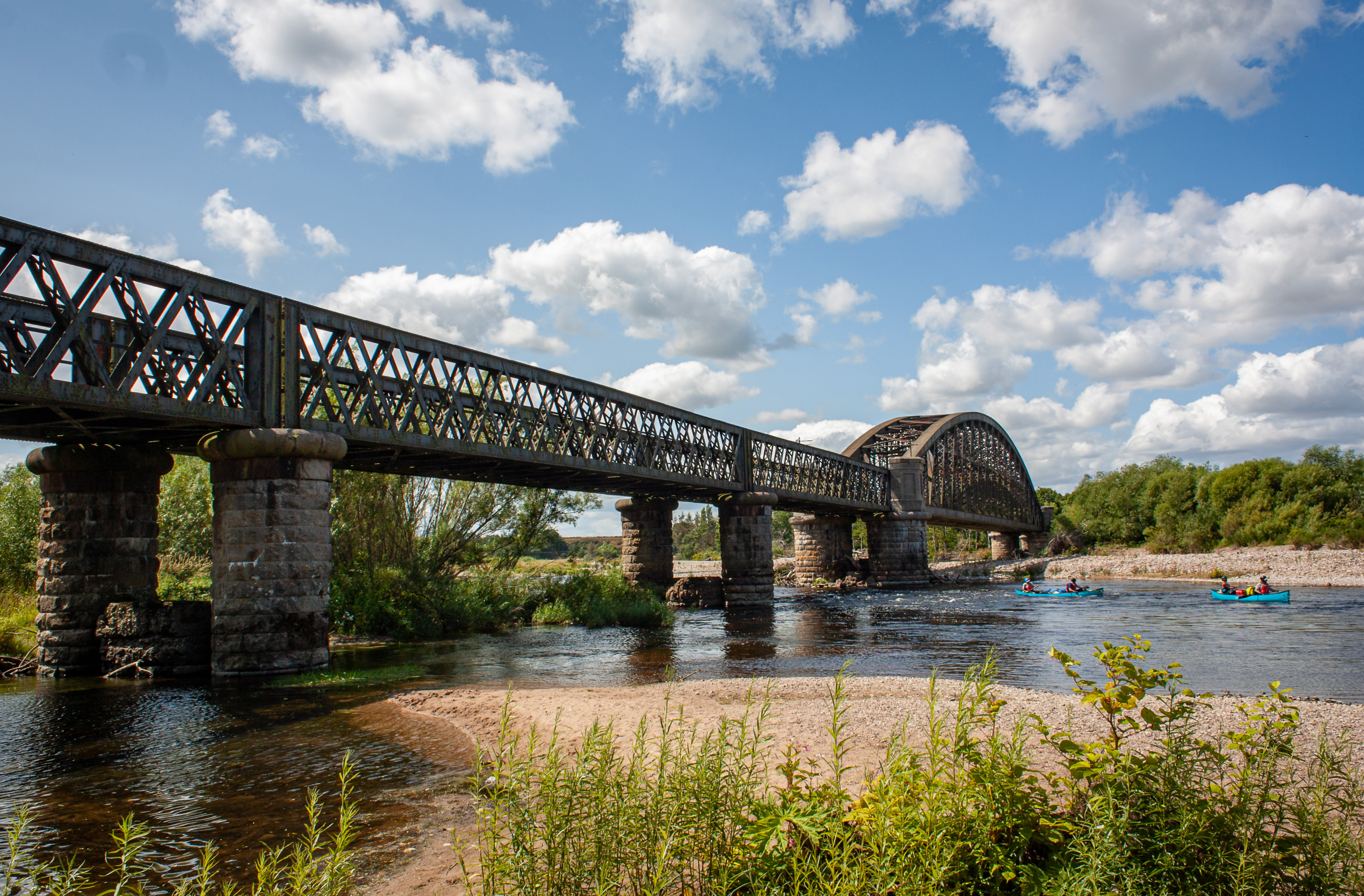
Spey Viaduct bridge by Garmouth

The river traditionally supported many local industries, from the salmon fishing industry to shipbuilding. At one stage, Garmouth functioned as the shipbuilding capital of Britain, with timber from the forests around Aviemore and Aberlour being rafted down to create wooden-hulled ships.

The river is known by anglers for the quality of its salmon and trout fishing, including a particular form of fly fishing where the angler uses a double-handed fly rod to throw a 'Spey cast' whereby the fly and the line do not travel behind the fisher (thereby keeping these away from the bushes and trees lining the banks behind him or her). This type of cast was developed on the Spey.

Speyside distilleries produce more whisky than any other region. Scotland's Malt Whisky Trail is a tourism initiative featuring seven working Speyside distilleries, a historic distillery and the Speyside Cooperage. The concept was created in the early 1980s. The region is a natural for whisky distillers because of three benefits: it is close to barley farms, contains the River Spey and is close to the port of Garmouth.

The Speyside Way, a long-distance footpath, follows the river from Newtonmore to the sea, passing through the County of Inverness, County of Banff and County of Moray.

The River Spey is unusual in that its speed increases as it flows closer to the sea, due to a broadly convex long-profile. For most of its course the Spey does not meander, although it rapidly moves its banks. South of Fochabers a high earth barrier reinforces the banks, but the river has broken through on several occasions, removing a large portion of Garmouth Golf Course, sections of wall surrounding Gordon Castle, parts of the Speyside Way and some of the B9104 road.

The Spey Viaduct (pedestrianised as of 1983) between Spey Bay and Garmouth was originally designed with its main span over the main flow of the river, however before construction was completed the river had changed its course and was running at one end of the bridge. The viaduct collapsed on 14 December 2025.

== Settlements ==
Starting from the source

- Laggan
- Newtonmore
- Inverdruie
- Aviemore
- Boat of Garten
- Grantown on Spey
- Cromdale
- Mains of Dalvey
- Advie
- Ballindalloch
- Pitchroy
- Blacksboat
- Marypark
- Knockando
- Carron
- Speyview
- Aberlour
- Craigellachie
- Dandalieth
- Rothes
- Crofts
- Newlands of Dundurcas
- Garbity
- Ordiequish
- Fochabers
- Upper Dallachy
- Bogmoor
- Nether Dallachy
- Stynie
- Garmouth
- Kingston on Spey
- Spey Bay

== See also ==
- List of crossings of the River Spey
