= Peter MacKenzie (moderator) =

Scottish minister

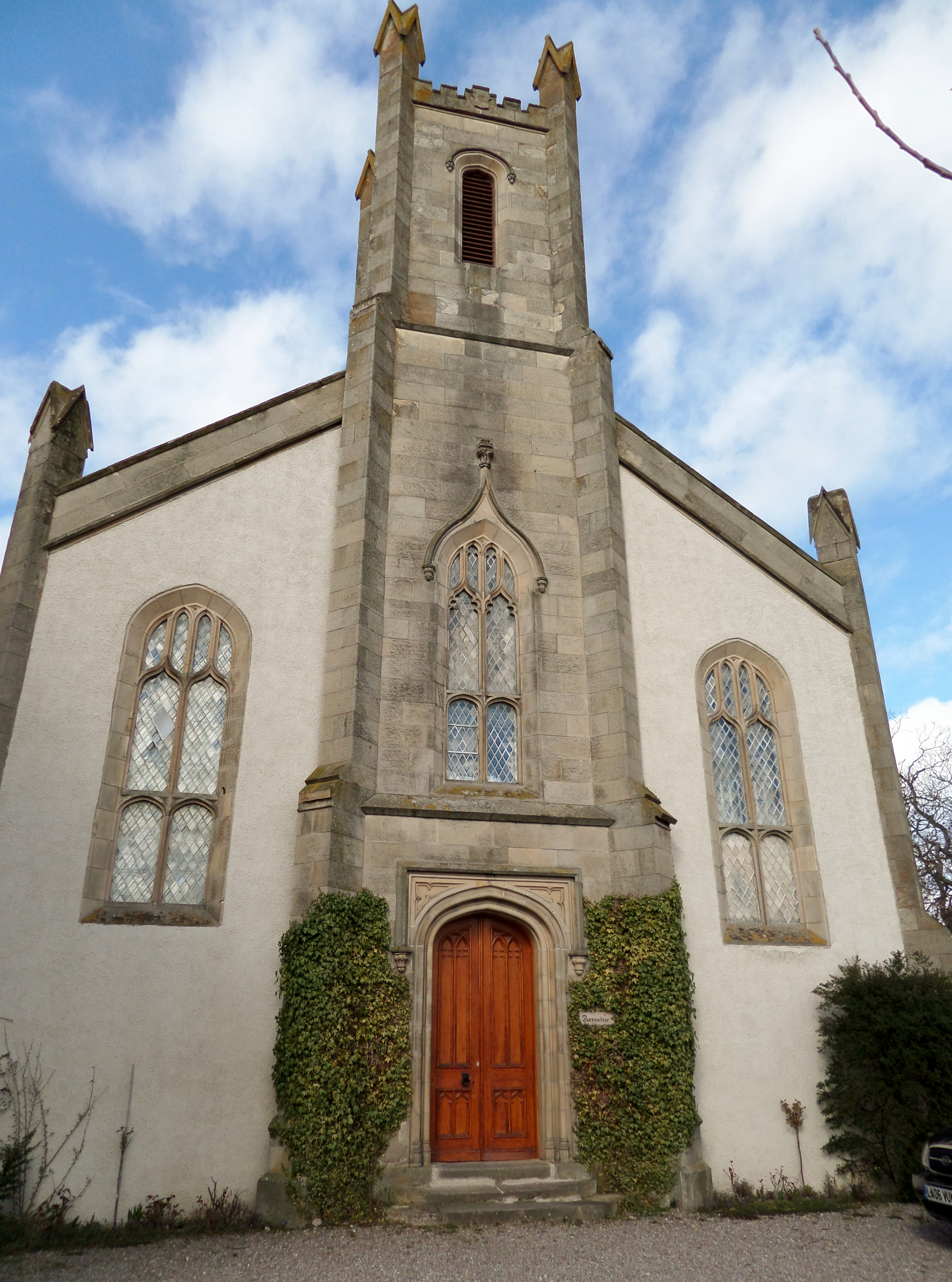
Urquhart Church

Peter MacKenzie (1811–1890) was a Scottish minister who served as Moderator of the General Assembly of the Church of Scotland in 1884.

== Life ==
He was born on 30 November 1811, the son of Rev John MacKenzie of Lochcarron church

He studied Divinity at King's College, Aberdeen graduating MA in 1828. He was licensed by his home Presbytery in Lochcarron and ordained as minister of Tongue in September 1843, his patron being Arthur Forbes of Culloden. Only 6 months later, in March 1844 he translated to Urquhart church to replace Rev John MacDonald (who had defected to the Free church). MacKenzie then settled in Urquhart for the rest of his life.

Aberdeen University awarded him an honorary doctorate (DD) in 1875. In 1884 he was elected Moderator of the General Assembly - the highest position in the Church of Scotland - succeeding Very Rev John Rankine of Sorn. He was succeeded in turn in 1885 by Rev Alexander Ferrier Mitchell.

He died on 12 October 1890. He is buried in Urquhart parish churchyard.

== Family ==
In January 1845 he married Margaret Mackintosh Grant (1825-1913) daughter of Rev James Grant of Nairn. Her brother was the explorer James Augustus Grant.
