= Garmouth =

Coordinates: 57°39′50″N 3°06′36″W

Garmouth: Scottish Gaelic: A' Ghearmaich
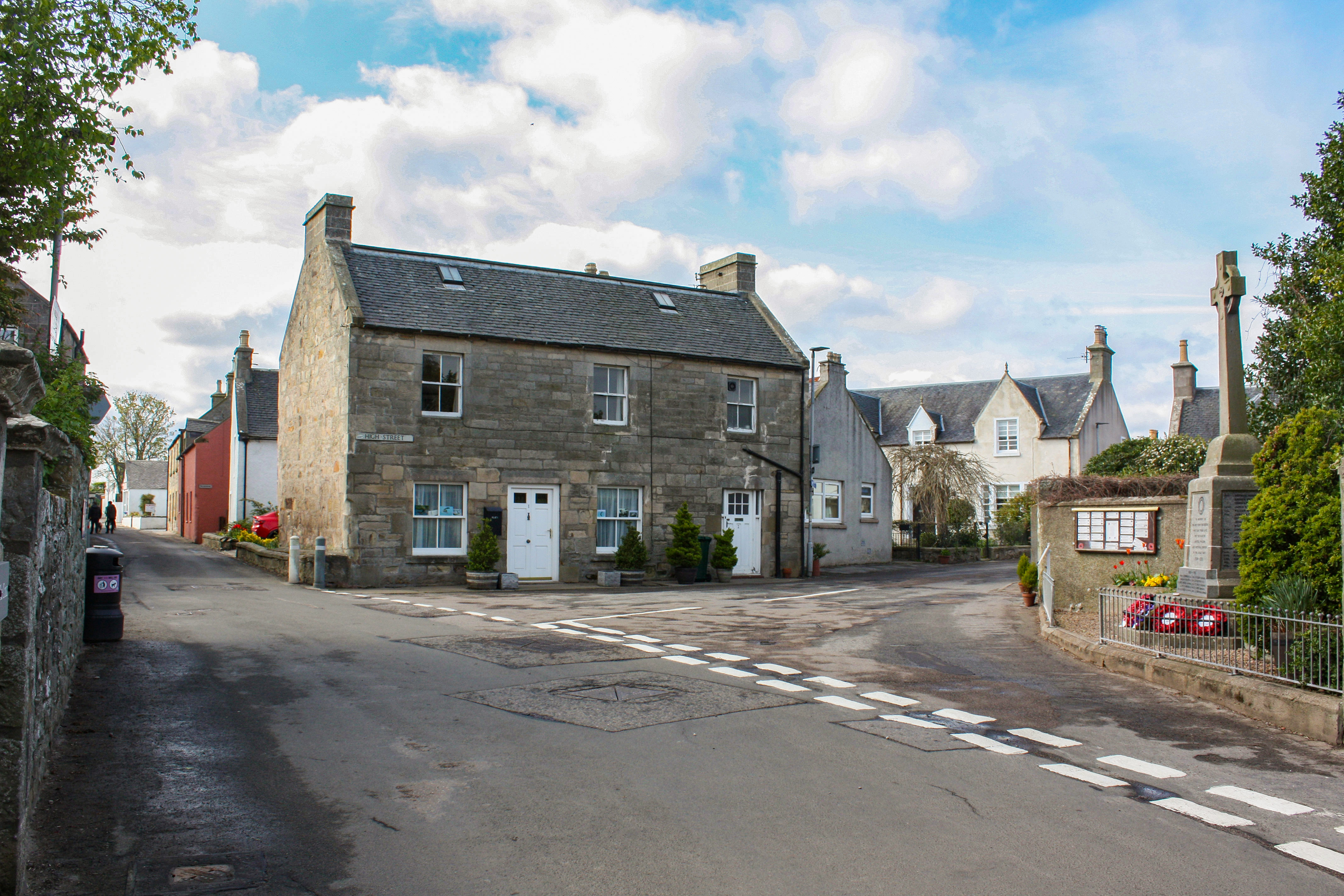
- Garmouth high street

- Location within Moray
- Population: 540 (2020)
- OS grid reference: NJ335641
- Council area: Moray
- Lieutenancy area: Moray
- Country: Scotland
- Sovereign state: United Kingdom
- Post town: FOCHABERS
- Postcode district: IV32
- Police: Scotland
- Fire: Scottish
- Ambulance: Scottish
- UK Parliament: Moray
- Scottish Parliament: Moray

Garmouth (Scottish Gaelic: A' Ghearmaich) is a village in Moray, north east Scotland. It is situated close to the mouth of the River Spey and the coast of the Moray Firth at nearby Kingston (originally called the Port of Garmouth, it was renamed after a number of shipbuilders from Kingston-Upon-Hull found success there).

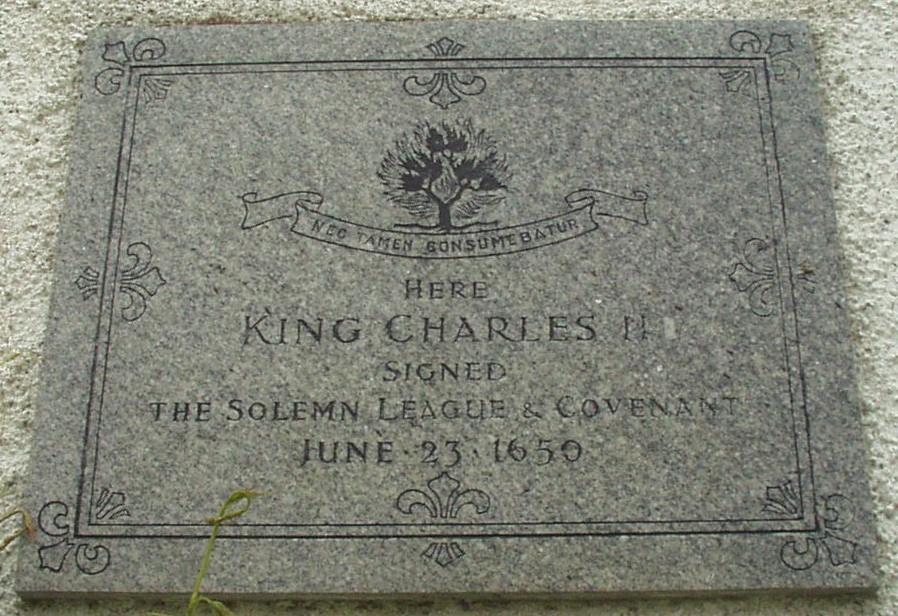
Plaque commemorating the landing of King Charles II at Garmouth

Garmouth has a claim to fame as the landing point of King Charles II on his return from exile in 1650 AD. A plaque in the village commemorates his signing there of the 1638 National Covenant and the 1643 Solemn League and Covenant shortly after coming ashore.

The village is also home to the Maggie Fair, a historical annual event said to be named after Lady Margaret Ker, wife of Sir James Innes, of that ilk, 3rd Baronet, but in fact predating her connection with it – as recorded in the 1950 Tricentenary booklet "The History of Garmouth and Maggie Fair" by Sir Thomas Innes of Learney.

== See also ==
- Garmouth railway station
