= Spey Viaduct =

Railway viaduct in Moray, Scotland

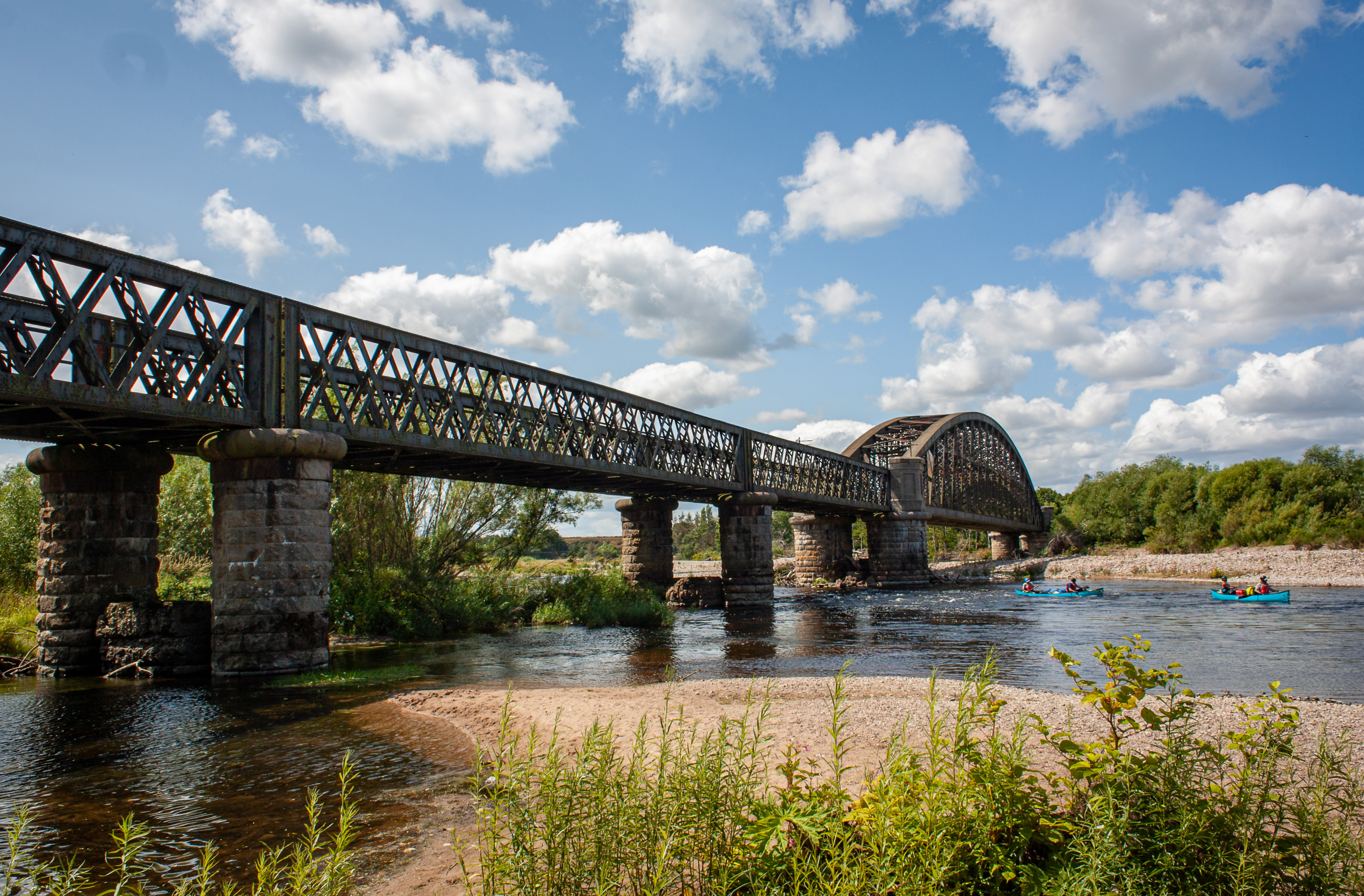
- The Spey Viaduct before its collapse
- Coordinates: 57.6627°N 3.0979°W
- OS grid reference: NJ 34590 64184
- Carried: Moray Coast Trail; 1
- Crossed: River Spey
- Locale: Garmouth
- Other names: Spey Bay Viaduct; Garmouth Viaduct; Speymouth Railway Viaduct
- Named for: River Spey
- Owner: Moray Council

Characteristics
- Total length: 947.5 feet (288.8 m)
- Longest span: 350 feet (110 m)
- No. of spans: 7

History
- Built: 1883–1886
- Construction cost: £40,000 (1886)
- Opened: 1 May 1886
- Collapsed: 14 December 2025
- Closed: 14 December 2025

Listed Building – Category B
- Official name: Speymouth Railway Viaduct
- Designated: 19 August 1981
- Reference no.: LB14873

Location
- Interactive map of Spey Viaduct

Spey Viaduct is a former railway bridge which spans the mouth of the River Spey in northern Scotland. The line opened in 1886, closed to railway traffic in 1968, and has been used as a cycle and footpath since rail closure. The structure is listed as Category B with Historic Environment Scotland. The bridge was built on dry land, with the river diverted beneath it after completion, and it cost £40,000, which was around a seventh of the total cost of the Moray Coast Line. In December 2025, the viaduct partially collapsed into the river below.

== History ==
The design of the bridge was down to Patrick Moir Barnett and the contract for the ironwork on the bridge was awarded to the Blaikie Brothers of Aberdeen. The bridge has three sets of 100-foot (30 m) spans on either side which meet in the middle with a 350 feet (110 m) bowed central truss section. The central section reaches a height above the viaduct's deck of 43 feet (13 m), and the girder tops on the six approach spans are 11 feet (3.4 m) high above the deck. The supports for the bridge are all cylindrical iron pipes at a diameter of 13 feet (4 m) and cladded with stone, though they had to be sunk quite deep (about 50 feet (15 m) below the surface) due to a lack of a suitable bedrock beneath the bridge. The combined length of the viaduct at 950 feet (290 m), (Note: Smith states the actual entire length of the structure to be 947.5 feet (288.8 m).) made it the longest single-track viaduct in Britain. The necessity for such a long viaduct was due to the River Spey becoming a delta in the area as it approached the sea. The bridge is quite low above the water level, and for the most part, covers rocks and grassy islands which are only underwater at times of flooding.

The bridge had been engineered on dry land and the river was diverted under the viaduct after it had been completed so that the main flow of the river would go underneath the western end and the central part of the viaduct, but soon after opening, the river changed its course eastwards underneath the eastern end of the viaduct. This led to a court case brought by the Duke of Richmond for loss of fishing rights and by the Fishery Board for the "diminution in the salmon [stock of the river]." The central truss section largely came to be located over a floodplain in the middle of the river mouth.

The viaduct had a total weight of 588 tonnes (579 long tons; 648 short tons) and was built between 1883 and 1886 at a cost of £40,000 (equivalent to £4,495,000 in 2025) which was a seventh of the overall cost of the whole Moray Coast Line. It was tested by Major Marindin (an inspector from the Board of Trade) on 22 April 1886 when six engines were positioned on the bridge with a combined weight of 420 tonnes (410 long tons; 460 short tons). It was opened for passenger traffic on 1 May 1886, goods services having started earlier.

=== Naming ===
Most documents refer to the bridge as Spey Viaduct; however, Historic Environment Scotland has an official listing for Speymouth Railway Viaduct. It is also known as Spey Bay Viaduct, and Garmouth Viaduct.

Another viaduct which is still in daily railway use on the old Inverness and Aberdeen Junction Railway (now the Aberdeen–Inverness line) is also called Spey Viaduct. This span was opened in August 1858.

== Post rail-closure ==
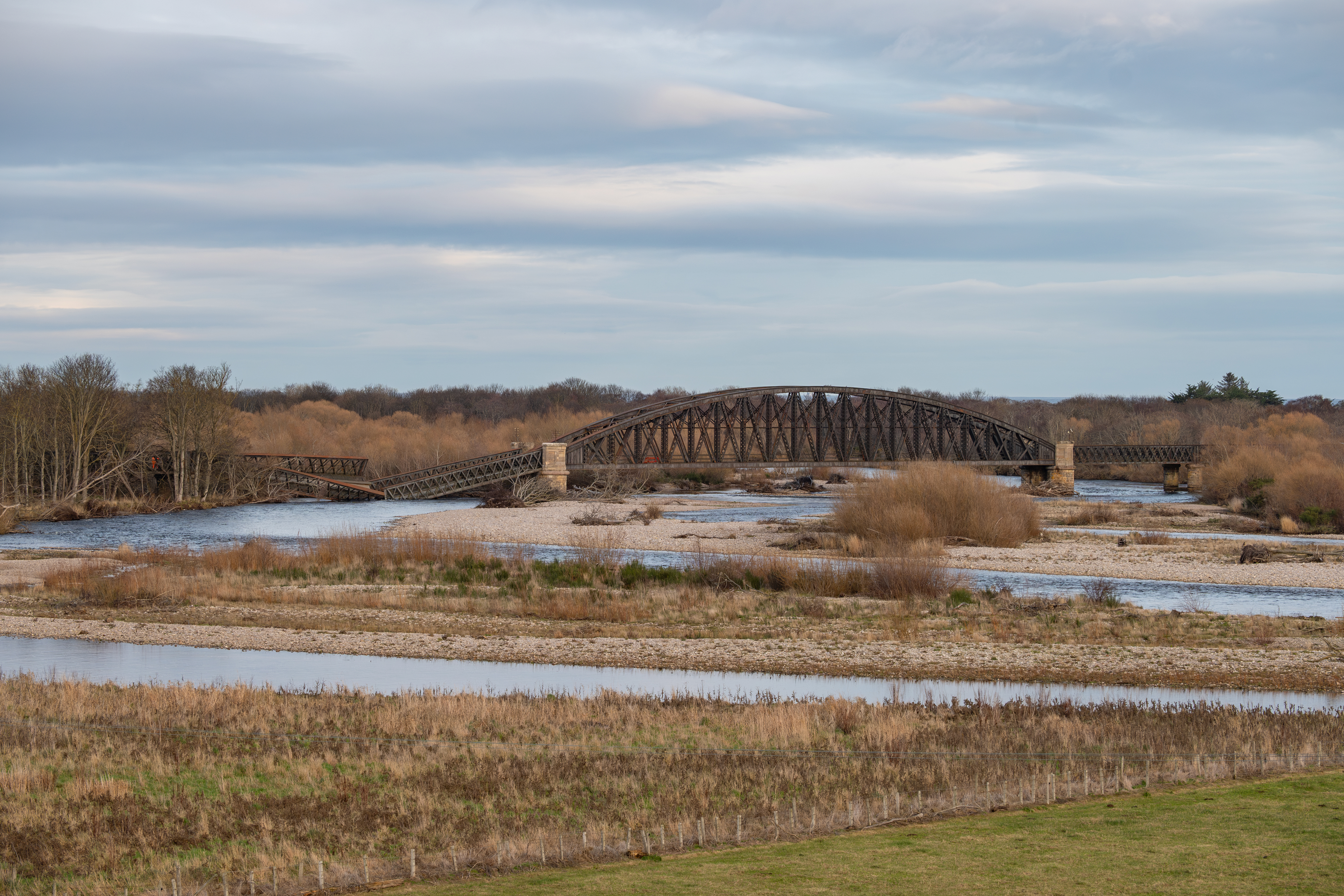
The Spey Viaduct following its collapse

The viaduct closed to rail traffic in 1968, since when it has been maintained and owned by Moray Council, who opened it as a public walkway in 1978. The bridge carries the Moray Coast Trail, and National Cycle Route 1 (NCN1). On 14 December 2025, the viaduct partially collapsed with two of the approach spans falling into the river after the piers had suffered scour from the action of the water passing beneath the bridge. The council have intimated that the finances to repair or replace the bridge may be beyond their means.

== See also ==
- List of bridges in Scotland
