= Speyside Way =

Long-distance path in the Scottish Highlands

- Trail logo
- Length: 137 km (85 mi)
- Location: Scottish Highlands
- Established: 1981; 45 years ago
- Designation: Scotland's Great Trails
- Trailheads: Buckie; Newtonmore
- Use: Hiking
- Elevation gain/loss: 1,485 metres (4,872 ft)
- Season: All year
Trail map

The Speyside Way (Doric: Strathspey Way; Scottish Gaelic: Slighe Shrath Spe) is a long-distance path in the Scottish Highlands. The route begins in Buckie and ends at Newtonmore,137 kilometres (85 mi) away. There is an optional spur leading off the main route to Tomintoul, adding 25 kilometres (16 mi) and 865 metres (2,838 ft) of ascent.

The route primarily follows the River Spey through the scenery of Banffshire, Morayshire and Inverness-shire in Scotland, passing some of the distilleries that produce Speyside single malts. The first section from Buckie to Spey Bay follows the coastline, while the final section from Aviemore to Newtonmore follows most of the route of the former Strathspey Railway. It is listed as one of Scotland's Great Trails by NatureScot, and links directly to two further Great Trails: the Dava Way and the Moray Coast Trail. About 52,750 people use the path every year, of whom about 2,750 complete the entire route. As with the other Great Trails, the Way is waymarked with a symbol showing a thistle in a hexagon.

The Way was opened in 1981, from Spey Bay to Ballindalloch, and was extended over the years to reach Aviemore by 2000. In 2020 the final extension to Newtonmore was completed. In 2021 the route's official website was modernised and its former bootprint logo replaced by a green-blue circle enclosing a stylised distillery and salmon.

Since 1994, the Speyside Way Ultramarathon has been run from Cragganmore distillery in Ballindalloch to Buckie, a distance of 36.5 miles (58.7 km).

== See also ==
- Dava Way
- Moray Coast Trail
