= Drybridge Platform railway station =

Railway station in Moray, Scotland

Drybridge Platform Letterfourie
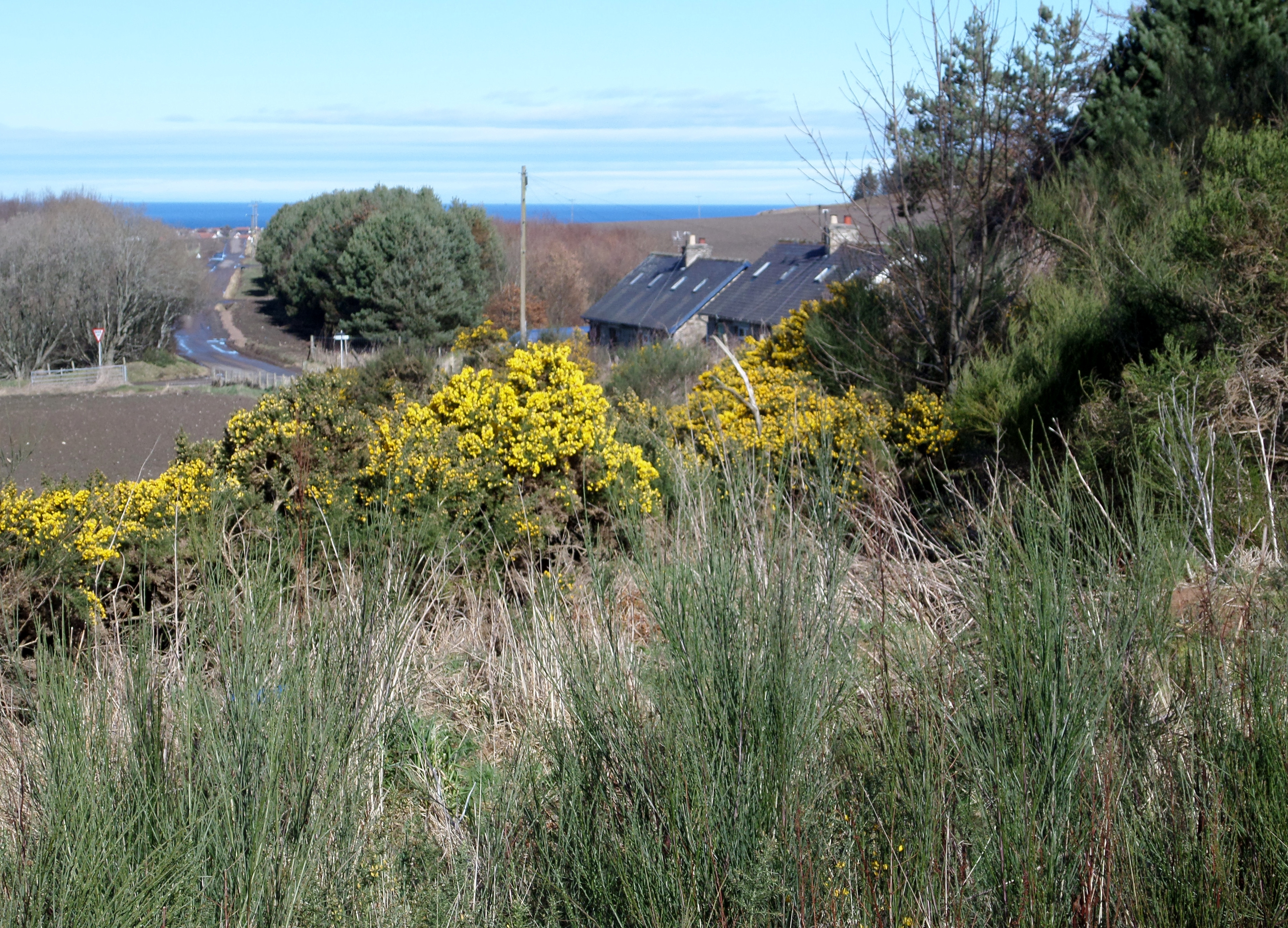
- View from Drybridge or Letterfourie Platform

General information
- Location: Drybridge, Moray; Scotland
- Coordinates: 57.653129°N 2.946597°W
- Grid reference: NJ 435 629
- Platforms: 1

Other information
- Status: Disused

History
- Original company: Highland Railway
- Pre-grouping: Highland Railway
- Post-grouping: London, Midland and Scottish Railway

Key dates
- 1 April 1885: Station opens as 'Drybridge Platform'
- 7 August 1915: Station closes to passengers
- 1928: Station named 'Letterfourlie' by the LMS
Location

Drybridge Platform railway station or Drybridge railway station was a station which served the hamlet of that name in the parish of Rathven and in addition provided transport for the inhabitants of the Parish of Deskford, Scottish county of Moray. It was served by trains on the Buckie and Portessie Branch north of Keith.

The station was renamed Letterfourie station, the title of the nearby estate by the LMS and this name is used on the 1928 and the 1938 OS maps.

== History ==
The station was not included in the tenders issued for the building of the stations even though Drybridge had been included in the list agreed upon on 3 July 1883 by the Highland Railway Board. Following the delivery of a petition from the inhabitants of Drybridge village a station was opened by the Highland Railway on 1 April 1885 at a cost of £210. It was located on the "up" side of the line and was reached via a gate at the roadside and a path through the field.

In 1889 the inhabitants of Drybridge petitioned for a goods station however it was decided that the gradients were too steep and the request was declined. Seven years later a second attempt was made with the same result. In December 1906 it was decided to install a siding about one mile from Drybridge on the "Down" line facing Keith and lying towards Rathven for the delivery of clay and pipes required to construct a reservoir. By March 1909 the works had been completed and the siding was duly lifted.

In 1889 Drybridge was upgraded in status through the appointment of a station master, Alexander Dott, who had been a porter at Buckie and who was to be the only station master for Drybridge. The station did not prosper for it was decided that not all trains should stop at Drybridge and the station became a request stop.

The construction of the GNoSR Moray coast route "effectively doomed the Highland route. Westbound journeys were shorter via the GNSR, and although the route to Aberdeen was longer, the Moray Coast Railway had services that were faster, more frequent and more convenient, with through trains running from Elgin, along the coast and to Aberdeen. As a rather straggly branch line, the Highland route struggled to compete, and the population between Buckie and Keith was too sparse to provide much additional traffic."

=== Suspension of services and final closure ===
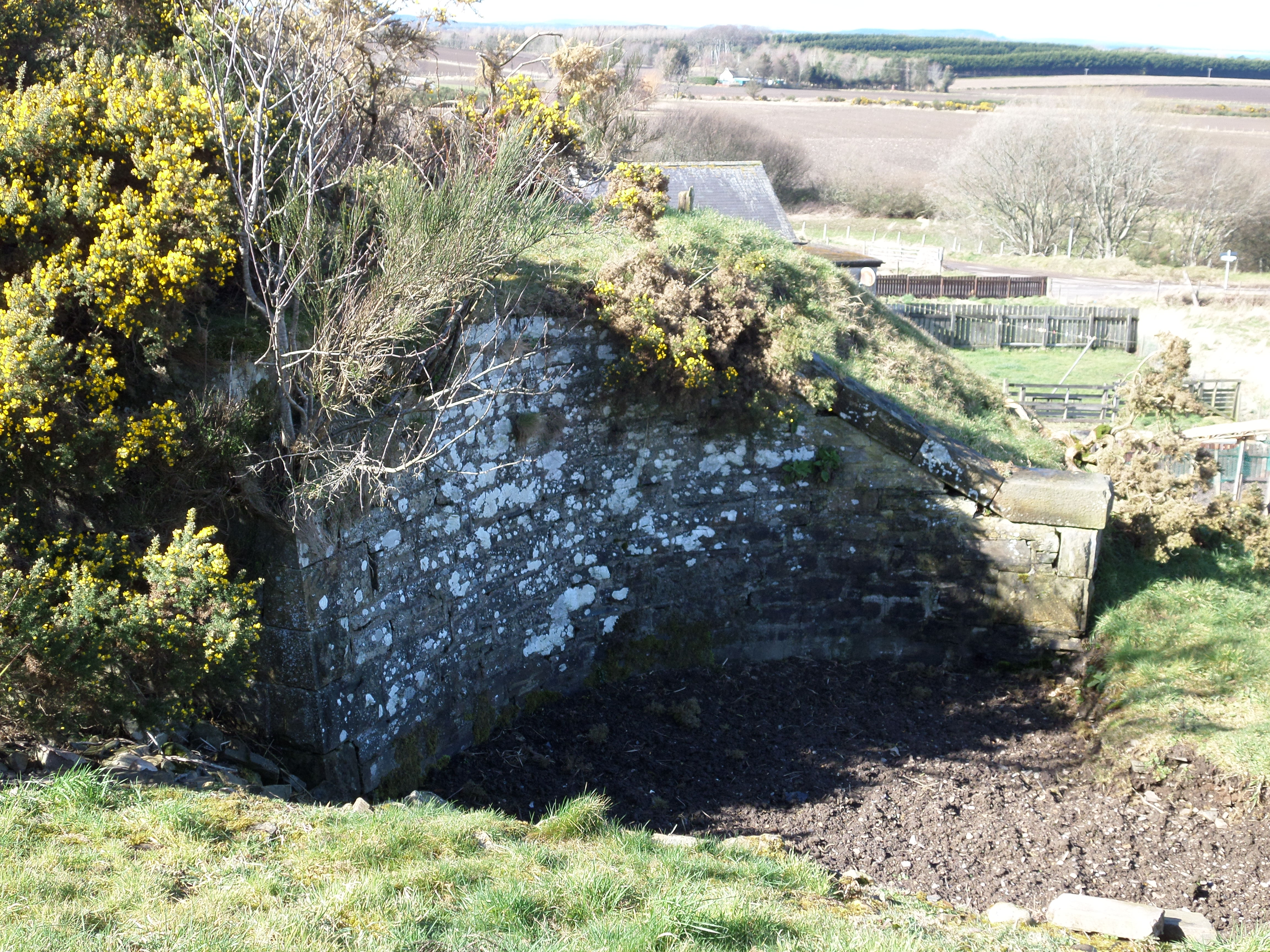
Ruins of the old overbridge.

Drybridge had a short life with services being suspended during World War I on 7 August 1915 and the rails south of Buckie removed for use at Inverness and Invergordon by the Admiralty, the station buildings being left intact as it was hoped to restart services after the war had ended.

The line remained closed in 1923, when the Highland Railway was absorbed by the London, Midland and Scottish Railway (LMS). After this the track was relaid following the removal of whin and gorse scrub and the laying of new ballast, but services were not restarted even though the station was officially renamed 'Letterfourie' in April 1925 due to the presence in Ayrshire of another Drybridge that had passed to the London, Midland and Scottish Railway from the Glasgow and South Western Railway. The track was removed again in 1937. The nearby Aultmore became the terminus of a goods spur from Keith and continued in use until 1966.

Work had begun on the Keith to Portessie line of the Highland Railway on 7 November 1882. Wartime economies led to closure of the line on 7 August 1915 and in 1917 the track between Aultmore (towards Keith) and Portessie was requisitioned by the Admiralty. The Great North of Scotland Railway (GNoSR) re-opened the north and south sections of line by 1919, but the Aultmore to Portessie section (passing through Drybridge) was never re-opened and the track was again removed in 1937 to 'aid the war effort'.

As stated 'Letterfourie station' is recorded at this site on the 1938 OS map with railway track in situ, the name is that of the nearby house and estate. The London, Midland and Scottish Railway (LMS) had renamed the station, but never actually reopened it or this section of the line.

=== Infrastructure ===
The station had a single platform, a small shelter with two sections, a signal in 1902 only and an over bridge on the Rathven side. Drybridge platform was built of timber. In April 1907 the signals were taken out of use at the intermediate stations.

The station buildings consisted of a single platform and a small building consisting of a ticket office and a waiting room. After confirmation of closure the station was sold to one of the demolition workers for £5 and was taken to Keith.

== The site today ==
No remains of the station are to be found at the site, however the gate post survives in situ and the sections of the road leading to the overbridge remain together with remnants of the bridge itself. The style of the nearby cottages suggests that they may have been built for railway workers.

| Preceding station | Historical railways | Following station |
|---|---|---|
| Enzie | Highland Railway; Buckie and Portessie Branch | Rathven |
