= Buckie railway station (Highland Railway) =

Disused railway station in Scotland

Buckie (Highland Railway)
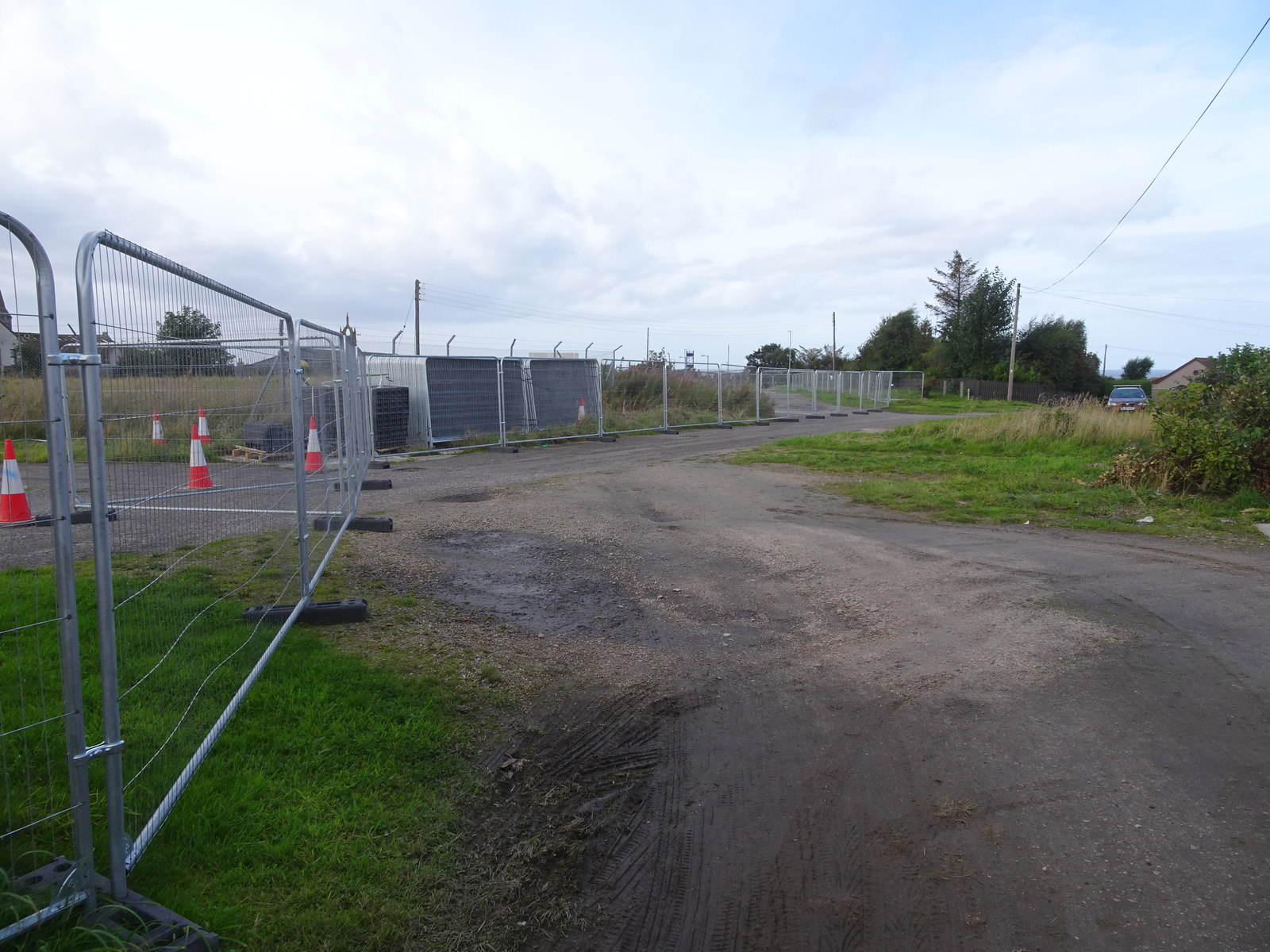

General information
- Location: Buckie, Moray; Scotland
- Coordinates: 57.6670°N 2.9377°W
- Grid reference: NJ 42819 65632
- Platforms: 1

Other information
- Status: Disused

History
- Original company: Highland Railway
- Pre-grouping: Highland Railway
- Post-grouping: London, Midland and Scottish Railway

Key dates
- 1 August 1884: Station opens as 'Buckie'
- 9 August 1915: Station closed to passengers
- 1 April 1944: Closed to goods traffic
Location

Buckie railway station was one of two stations which once served the town of Buckie, in the parish of Rathven, Scottish county of Moray. This Highland Railway station was served by trains on the Buckie and Portessie Branch north of Keith until 1915 and remained open for freight until April 1944.

== History ==
Work had begun on the Keith to Portessie line of the Highland Railway on 7 November 1882. The station was opened by the Highland Railway in 1884 to serve the sizeable town of Buckie but had a short life with services being suspended during World War I on 9 August 1915 In 1917 the track between Aultmore (towards Keith) and Portessie was requisitioned by the Admiralty and the rails south of Buckie removed as far as Aultmore, although it was the intention to reinstate the track and restart services when the war ended. The north and south sections of line were re-opened by 1919 but the central section of the line was still without track in 1923, when the Highland Railway was absorbed by the London, Midland and Scottish Railway (LMS). After this amalgamation the track between Buckie and Aultmore was relaid, however services were not restarted and the track removed again in around 1937.

The line to Aultmore became the terminus of a goods spur from Keith and continued in use until 1966 and the separated stub from Buckie to Portessie survived until 1944 in isolation from the rest of the, by then, London, Midland and Scottish Railway (LMS) system.

The construction of the GNoSR Moray coast route had "effectively doomed the Highland route. Westbound journeys were shorter via the GNSR, and although the route to Aberdeen was longer, the Moray Coast Railway had services that were faster, more frequent and more convenient, with through trains running from Elgin, along the coast and to Aberdeen. As a rather straggly branch line, the Highland route struggled to compete, and the population between Buckie and Keith was too sparse to provide much additional traffic."

=== Infrastructure ===
The station was accessed via East Cathcart Street and stood near the old Cluny Rope and Sail Works and the United Free Church. In the late 1930s it had a single platform, and a sizeable station building which was probably similar in design to the nearby Rathven railway station building. The station agent had a cottage here, a goods shed was on one siding and two other sidings were present in the goods yard. In 1902 the station additionally had a signal box on the Rathven end of the platform and a weighing machine was located in the goods yard.

The station was designed by Murdoch Paterson who also designed the station itself.

== The site today ==
In 2011 the goods shed and the station agent's house still stood.

== See also ==
- Bideford, Westward Ho! and Appledore Railway - another World War I requisitioned line that never re-opened.

Preceding station	Historical railways	Following station
Rathven	Highland Railway; Buckie and Portessie Branch	Portessie
