= Rathven railway station =

Former railway station in Scotland

Rathven

General information
- Location: Rathven, Moray; Scotland
- Coordinates: 57.6670°N 2.9377°W
- Grid reference: NJ 4414 6454
- Platforms: 1

Other information
- Status: Disused

History
- Original company: Highland Railway
- Pre-grouping: Highland Railway
- Post-grouping: London, Midland and Scottish Railway

Key dates
- 1 August 1884: Station opens as 'Rathven'
- 9 August 1915: Station closed to passengers
Location

Rathven railway station was a station which served the hamlet of that name, about a mile away in the parish of Rathven, Scottish county of Moray. It was served by trains on the Buckie and Portessie Branch north of Keith.

== History ==
The station was opened by the Highland Railway in 1884 to serve the small village and rural area of Rathven but had a short life with services being suspended during World War I on 9 August 1915 and the rails south of Buckie removed, although it was hoped to restart services. The line remained closed in 1923, when the Highland Railway was absorbed by the London, Midland and Scottish Railway (LMS). After this the track was relaid, but services were not restarted and the track removed again in 1937. The line to Aultmore became the terminus of a goods spur from Keith and continued in use until 1966.

The station was located next to the turnpike road and in 1915 it was reported that it had handled 3000 tons of goods traffic, mainly grain, meal, coal, potatoes and livestock. It is said that the station had been built at the behest of the Countess of Seafield who used the station to travel to Castle Grant from her home at Cullen House.

Work had begun on the Keith to Portessie line of the Highland Railway on 7 November 1882. Wartime economies led to closure of the line on 9 August 1915 and in 1917 the track between Aultmore (towards Keith) and Portessie was requisitioned by the Admiralty. The Great North of Scotland Railway (GNoSR) re-opened the north and south sections of line by 1919, but the Aultmore to Portessie section (passing through Drybridge) was never re-opened and the track was again removed in 1937.

The construction of the GNoSR Moray coast route "effectively doomed the Highland route. Westbound journeys were shorter via the GNSR, and although the route to Aberdeen was longer, the Moray Coast Railway had services that were faster, more frequent and more convenient, with through trains running from Elgin, along the coast and to Aberdeen. As a rather straggly branch line, the Highland route struggled to compete, and the population between Buckie and Keith was too sparse to provide much additional traffic."

The fair ground for the 'Peter Fair' and extra trains were run on these days.

Since 1871 Inchgower Distillery had been established nearby and Rathven handled all its traffic, together with agricultural produce and livestock.

=== Infrastructure ===
The station had a single stone built platform on the "up" side to the east, a signal box on the platform at the Buckie end and had sizeable and neat wooden station building, which, unlike many of the Great North of Scotland Railway (GNoSR) stations on the nearby Moray Coast line, had a canopy for passenger comfort whilst awaiting trains. A few \additional sidings were present to allow shunting to take place away from the main line, two loading banks and some railway cottages were present at the site, including two porter's cottages all designed by Murdoch Paterson who also designed the station itself.

== The site today ==
The nearby road overbridge has been demolished and houses occupy much of the station's site.

Preceding station	Historical railways	Following station
Drybridge	Highland Railway; Buckie and Portessie Branch	Buckie
