= Enzie railway station =

Former railway station in Scotland

Enzie
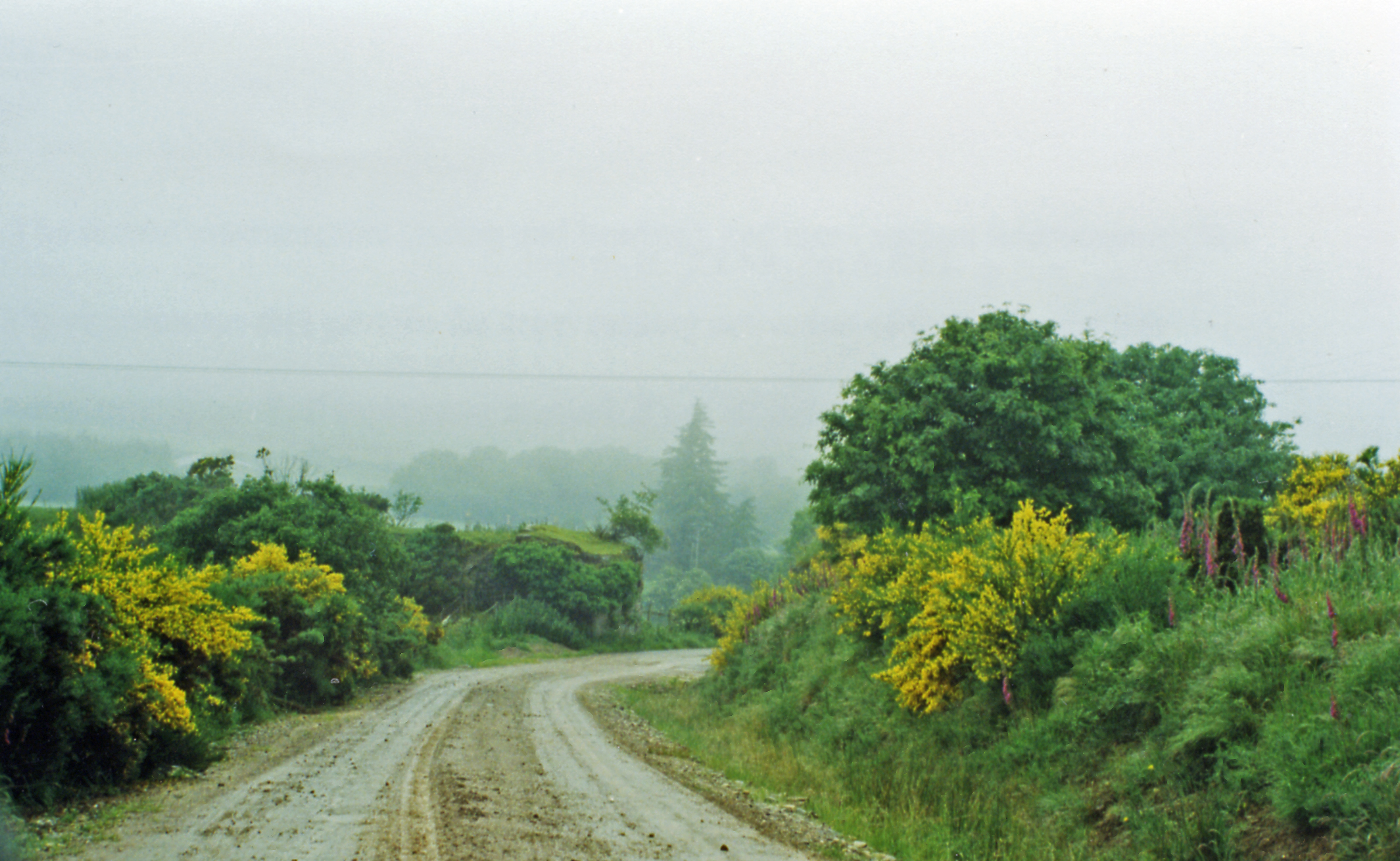
- The site of Enzie station

General information
- Location: Enzie, Moray; Scotland
- Coordinates: 57.6355°N 2.9889°W
- Grid reference: NJ 410 610
- Platforms: 1

Other information
- Status: Disused

History
- Original company: Highland Railway
- Pre-grouping: Highland Railway

Key dates
- 1 August 1884: Station opens as 'Enzie'
- 9 August 1915: Station closes to passengers
Location

Enzie railway station was a station which served the hamlet of Enzie, in the Scottish county of Moray. It was served by trains on the Buckie and Portessie Branch north of Keith. The latter station is now the nearest to Enzie.

== History ==
The station was opened by the Highland Railway in 1884 and had a short life with services being suspended during World War I on 9 August 1915 and the rails south of Buckie removed, although it was hoped to restart services. The line remained closed in 1923, when the Highland Railway was absorbed by the London, Midland and Scottish Railway (LMS). After this the track was relaid, but services were not restarted and the track removed again in 1937. The nearby Aultmore became the terminus of a goods spur from Keith and continued in use until 1966.

Work had begun on the Keith to Portessie line of the Highland Railway on 7 November 1882. Wartime economies led to closure of the line on 9 August 1915 and in 1917 the track between Aultmore (towards Keith) and Portessie was requisitioned by the Admiralty. The Great North of Scotland Railway (GNoSR) re-opened the north and south sections of line by 1919, but the Aultmore to Portessie section passing through Enzie, Drybridge and Rathven was never re-opened and the track was again removed in 1937.

=== Infrastructure ===
The station had a single platform, a signal box and a goods shed with a stationmaster's house nearby. A set of sidings ran towards Aultmore with a weigh machine located to one side. A second signal box was located nearby on the line towards Drybridge Platform. Murdoch Paterson was the architect responsible for the station buildings.

== The site today ==
The station site is now occupied by a house. The original signal box can still be seen, albeit relocated to a residential garden as a feature, down in the village of Clochan some 1/2 mile away.

At the turn-off to the Enzie Station, a memorial to the Landgirls can be found honouring the effort that was made by the women during the wars of the 20th century. This was the first of any kind in Great Britain and was opened by Prince Charles in October 2012. There is a parking area and a bench for reflecting and remembering or enjoying the peaceful location or magnificent views across the Moray Firth.

Preceding station	Historical railways	Following station
Aultmore	Highland Railway; Buckie and Portessie Branch	Drybridge Platform
