= Portessie railway station =

Former railway station in Scotland

Portessie
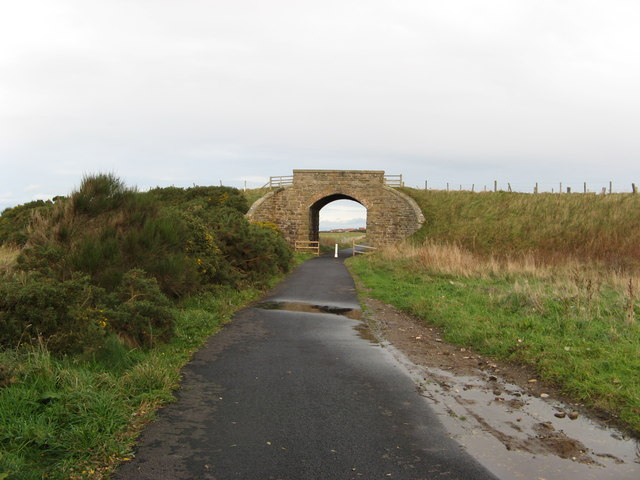
- The course of the old Portessie GNoSR station

General information
- Location: Portessie, Moray; Scotland
- Coordinates: 57.686314°N 2.930036°W
- Grid reference: NJ 4464 6665
- Platforms: 3

Other information
- Status: Disused

History
- Original company: Highland Railway
- Pre-grouping: Highland Railway
- Post-grouping: London, Midland and Scottish Railway

Key dates
- 1 August 1884: Station opens as 'Portessie'
- 1 May 1886: Portessie station and junction opened with the opening of the Moray Coast Railway.
- 9 August 1915: The Highland Railway station closed to passengers
- 1 April 1944: Highland Railway line closed to goods traffic
- 6 May 1968: Station closes to passenger and goods traffic
Location

Portessie railway station was a joint Highland Railway (HR) and Great North of Scotland Railway (GNoSR) station at the junction between the Moray Coast Railway and the Buckie and Portessie Branch which also served the small fishing village of Portessie, in the parish of Rathven, Scottish county of Moray.

The HR station's platform was served by trains on the Buckie and Portessie Branch north of Keith until 1915 and remained open for freight from Buckie station until April 1944. The GNoSR station remained open until 6 May 1968 when it closed for both passenger and goods traffic.

== History ==
=== The Highland Railway ===
Work had begun on the Keith to Portessie line of the Highland Railway on 7 November 1882.The station was opened by the Highland Railway in 1884 to serve the village of Portessie. a short life with services being suspended during World War I on 9 August 1915 and the rails south of Buckie removed as far as Aultmore, although it was the intention to reinstate the track and restart services when the war ended. The central section of the line was still without track in 1923, when the Highland Railway was absorbed by the London, Midland and Scottish Railway (LMS). After this amalgamation the track between Buckie and Aultmore was relaid, however services were not restarted and the track removed again in around 1937.

The separated stub from Buckie to Portessie survived until 1944 in isolation from the rest of the, by then, London, Midland and Scottish Railway (LMS) system.

The construction of the GNoSR Moray coast route had "effectively doomed the Highland route. Westbound journeys were shorter via the GNSR, and although the route to Aberdeen was longer, the Moray Coast Railway had services that were faster, more frequent and more convenient, with through trains running from Elgin, along the coast and to Aberdeen. As a rather straggly branch line, the Highland route struggled to compete, and the population between Buckie and Keith was too sparse to provide much additional traffic."

=== The Great North of Scotland Railway ===
In 1881 the Great North of Scotland Railway put a bill to parliament to extend its Portsoy line along the Moray Firth as far as Buckie. In 1882 the Great North of Scotland applied for permission to build a 25 1/4-mile (40.6 km) line from Portsoy following the coast to Buckie and then running on to Elgin.

In 1923 the Great North of Scotland Railway was absorbed by the London and North Eastern Railway and this company was nationalised in 1948, and services provided by British Railways. The station and line were recommended for closure by Dr Beeching in his report "The Reshaping of British Railways" and closed on 6 May 1968.

The station was host to a LNER camping coach in 1935 and 1936 and possibly one for some of 1934, there were two coaches here from 1937 to 1939. A camping coach was also positioned here by the Scottish Region from 1952 to 1963.

The GNoSR station was served by through trains running between Aberdeen and Elgin. There were no Sunday services.

== Joint station Infrastructure ==
=== The Highland ===
The station had an island platform with a station building that it shared with the GNoSR. The HR had a two bay engine shed, a water tower, a turntable and two exchange sidings. A signal box was originally located on the island platform and a run round or passing loop was present. Following the cessation of passenger services the signal box was closed and one bay was removed from the engine shed. The two lines ran parallel for a short distance before entering the station.

The station was designed by Murdoch Paterson who also designed the station itself.

=== The Great North of Scotland ===
The GNoSR station had two platforms and as stated it shared an island platform with the Highland Railways branch to Keith. The station had a passing loop, a signal box, a wooden station building, a loading bank with two sidings and a London and North Eastern Railway style pedestrian overbridge.

== The site today ==
In 2012 the platforms could still be seen, the trackbed was overgrown and partly infilled. The turntable pit associated with the Highland Railway shed also remained as did the base of the old water tower. The Buckie and Portessie Branch once ran westwards from Portessie, remaining on top of the cliff, passing the Pot O' Linn, skirting the rear of Cliff Terrace and crossing Harbour Street then swinging south and following the curve of Mill Crescent to stop at Buckie 'Highland' station.

== See also ==
- Bideford, Westward Ho! and Appledore Railway - another World War I requisitioned line that never re-opened.

Preceding station	Historical railways	Following station
Buckie	Highland; 1884–1915	Terminus
Buckie	Great North of Scotland	Findochty
