= Cullen railway station =

Former railway station in Scotland

Cullen
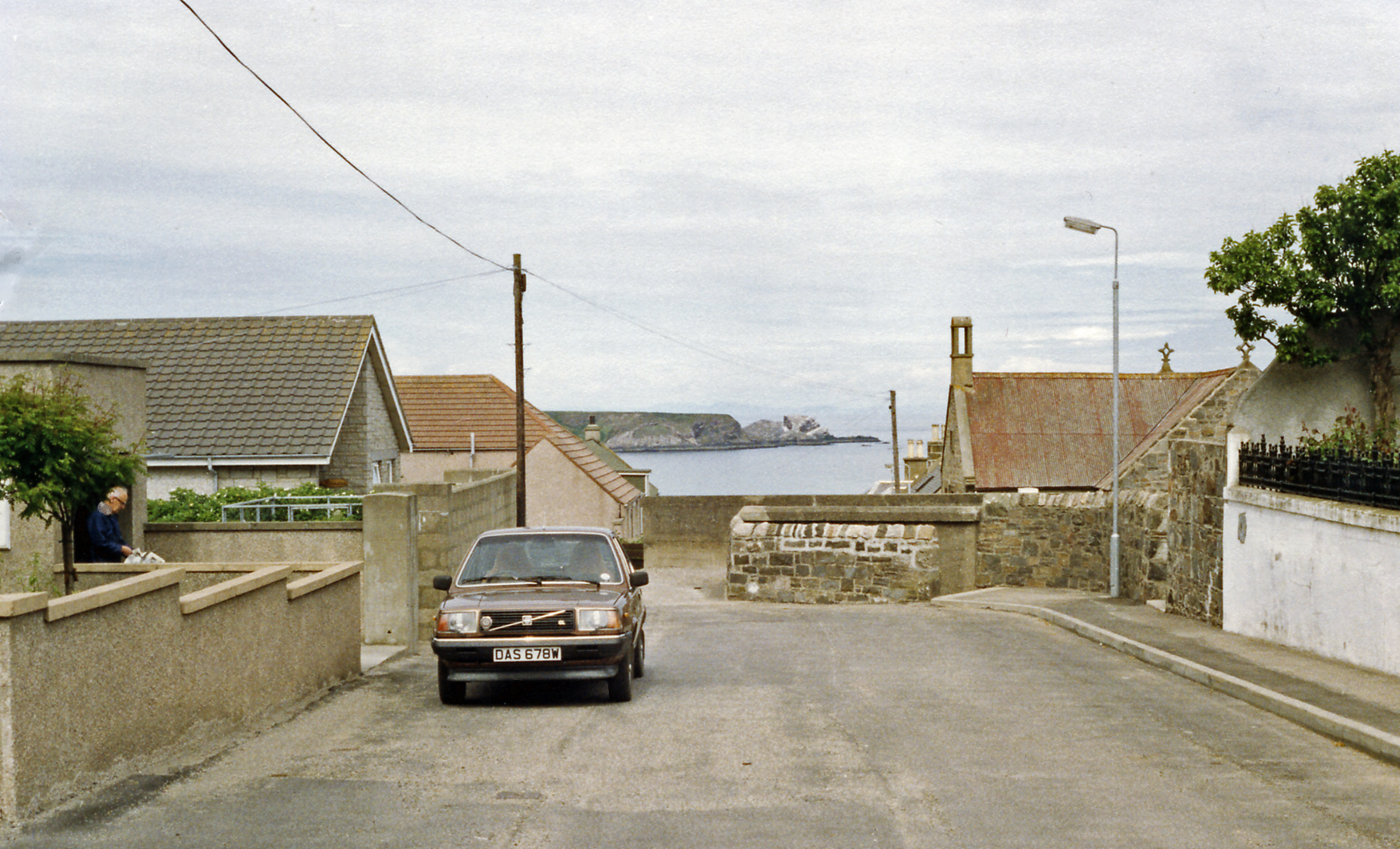
- The site of Cullen station

General information
- Location: Cullen, Moray; Scotland
- Coordinates: 57.692034°N 2.817123°W
- Grid reference: NJ 5138 6720
- Platforms: 1

Other information
- Status: Disused

History
- Pre-grouping: Great North of Scotland Railway
- Post-grouping: London and North Eastern Railway

Key dates
- 1 May 1886: Great North of Scotland station opened
- 6 May 1968: Closed
Location

Cullen railway station was a railway station that served the small fishing village of Cullen, close to Portknockie in Moray. The railway station was opened by the Great North of Scotland Railway (GNoSR) on its Moray Firth coast line in 1886, served by Aberdeen to Elgin trains.

In 1923 the GNoSR became part of the London and North Eastern Railway and at nationalisation in 1948 became part of British Railways. The station and line was recommended for closure by Dr Beeching's report "The Reshaping of British Railways" and closed on 6 May 1968.

== History ==
=== Background ===
In 1881 the Great North of Scotland Railway put a bill to parliament to extend its Portsoy line along the Moray Firth as far as Buckie. In 1882 the Great North of Scotland applied for permission to build a 25 1/4-mile (40.6 km) line from Portsoy following the coast to Buckie and then running on to Elgin.

=== Great North of Scotland Railway ===
The GNoSR station opened as 'Cullen' on 1 May 1886 with the central section of the coast line, served by through Aberdeen to Elgin trains. In 1923 the Great North of Scotland Railway was absorbed by the London and North Eastern Railway. This was nationalised in 1948, and services provided by British Railways. The station and line was recommended for closure by Dr Beeching's in his report "The Reshaping of British Railways" and closed on 6 May 1968.

== Services ==
The GNoSR station was served by through trains running between Aberdeen and Elgin. There were no Sunday services.

== The station infrastructure ==
Cullen station had a single curved platform with the typical wooden style of station building, however it was larger than many of the others with a central canopy between two wings. a passing loop was not provided. The 1902 OS map shows a weighing machine in the goods yard, several sidings and a goods shed. A station agent's or stationmaster's cottage sat near to the station.

The line was predominantly single track apart from a double track section between Buckie and Portessie. Track lifting took place shortly after closure in 1968.

=== The Cullen viaducts ===
Cullen Viaduct is a category B listed structure with eight arches, built to carry a single track, constructed in 1884 and approached by substantial embankments.

=== Station remnants ===
The station was demolished and the site is occupied by housing, however the Cullen railway viaducts were saved from demolition.

== Moray Cycle Route ==
Much of the trackbed of the old railway now forms the Moray Cycle Route.

Preceding station	Historical railways	Following station
Portknockie	Great North of Scotland	Tochieneal
