= Patent of Toleration =

1781 edict by Holy Roman Emperor Joseph II

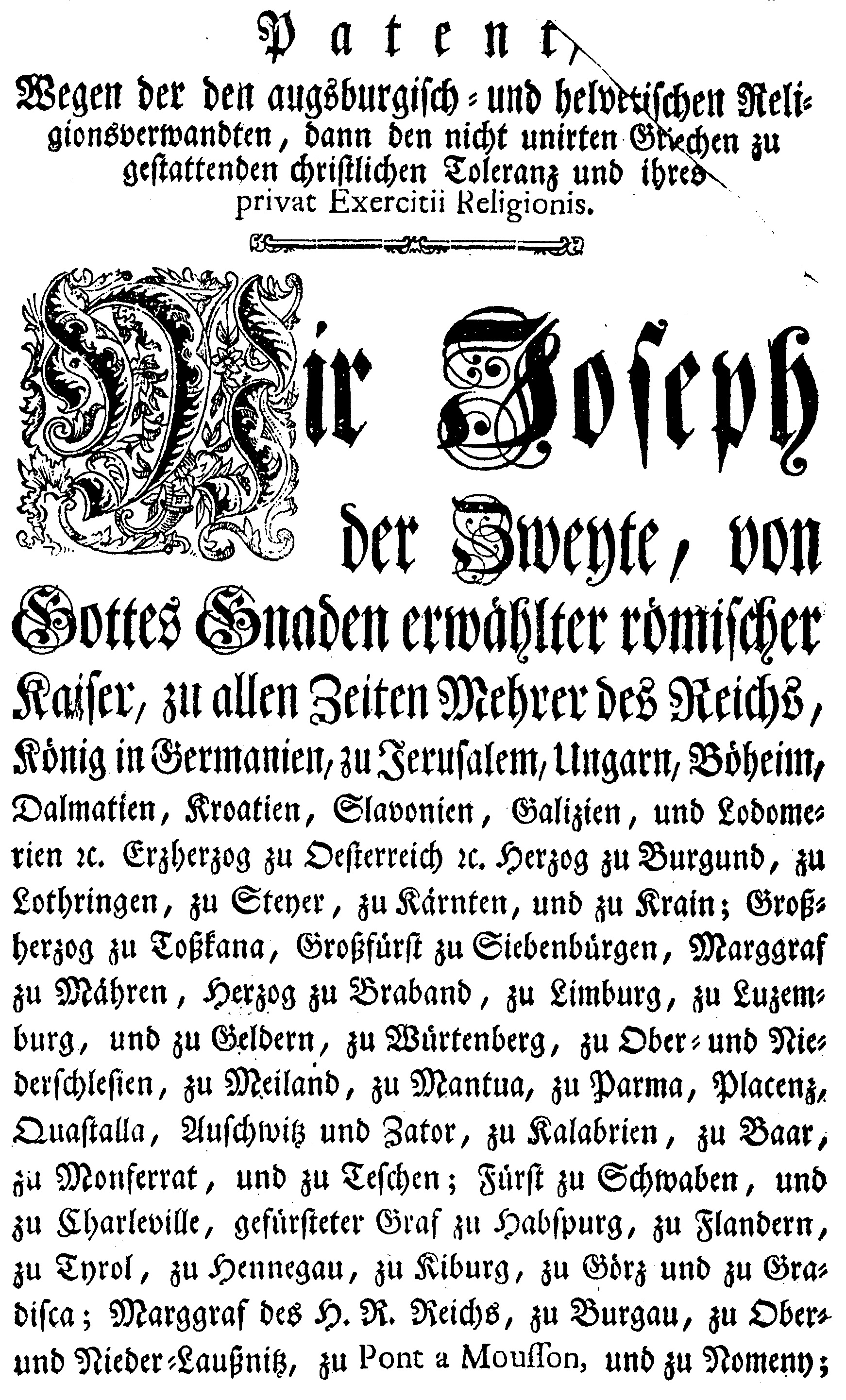
Front page of the edict

The Patent of Toleration (German: Toleranzpatent, Hungarian: Türelmi rendelet) was an edict of toleration issued on 13 October 1781 by the Habsburg emperor Joseph II. Part of the Josephinist reforms, the Patent extended religious freedom to non-Catholic Christians living in the crown lands of the Habsburg monarchy, including Lutherans, Calvinists, and the Eastern Orthodox. Specifically, these members of minority faiths were now legally permitted to hold "private religious exercises" in clandestine churches.

For the first time after the Counter-Reformation, the Patent guaranteed the practice of religion by the Evangelical Lutheran and the Reformed Church in Austria. Nevertheless, worship was heavily regulated, wedding ceremonies remained reserved for the Catholic Church, and the Unity of the Brethren was still suppressed. Similar to the articular churches admitted 100 years before, Protestants were only allowed to erect 'houses of prayer' (Bethäuser) which should not in any way resemble church buildings. In many Habsburg areas, especially in the 'hereditary lands' of Upper Austria, Styria and Carinthia, Protestant parishes quickly developed, strongly relying on crypto-protestant traditions. The Patent also regulated mixed faith marriages, foreshadowing the Marriage Patent that was to be released in 1783 seeking to bring marriages under civil rather than canon law. In allowing marriages between religions, if the father was Catholic all children were required to be raised as Catholics whilst if the mother was Catholic only the daughters had to be raised as such.

The Patent was followed by the Edict of Tolerance for Jews in 1782. The edict extended to Jews the freedom to pursue all branches of commerce, but also imposed new requirements. Jews were required to create German-language primary schools or send their children to Christian schools (Jewish schools had previously taught children to read and write Hebrew in addition to mathematics.) The Patent also permitted Jews to attend state secondary schools. A series of laws issued soon after the Edict of Toleration abolished the autonomy of the Jewish communities, which had previously run their own court, charity, internal taxation and school systems; required Jews to acquire family names; made Jews subject to military conscription; and required candidates for the rabbinate to have secular education.

The 1781 Patent was originally called the "Divine Send of Equal Liberties" but was further put down by the monarch's advisor. Constraints on the construction of churches were abolished after the revolutions of 1848. The Protestant Church did not receive an equivalent legal status until Emperor Franz Joseph I of Austria issued the Protestantenpatent in 1861.

== See also ==
- Reformation in the Kingdom of Hungary
- Metropolitanate of Karlovci

== Sources ==
- Ingrao, Charles W. (2000) [1994]. The Habsburg Monarchy, 1618–1815 (2nd ed.). Cambridge: Cambridge University Press.
- Kaplan, Benjamin J. (2007). Divided by Faith: Religious Conflict and the Practice of Toleration in Early Modern Europe. Cambridge, MA: Harvard University Press.
