= Findochty railway station =

Former railway station in Scotland

Findochty

General information
- Location: Findochty, Moray; Scotland
- Coordinates: 57.69668°N 2.897671°W
- Grid reference: NJ 46590 67783
- Platforms: 1

Other information
- Status: Disused

History
- Pre-grouping: Great North of Scotland Railway
- Post-grouping: London and North Eastern Railway

Key dates
- 1 May 1886: Great North of Scotland station opened
- 6 May 1968: Closed
Location

Findochty railway station was a railway station in the small fishing village of Findochty, Moray about 3 miles to the east of Buckie. The railway station was opened by the Great North of Scotland Railway (GNoSR) on its Moray Firth coast line in 1886, served by Aberdeen to Elgin trains.

In 1923 the GNoSR became part of the London and North Eastern Railway and at nationalisation in 1948 became part of British Railways. The station and line was recommended for closure by Dr Beeching's report "The Reshaping of British Railways" and closed on 6 May 1968.

== History ==
=== Background ===
In 1881 the Great North of Scotland Railway put a bill to parliament to extend its Portsoy line along the Moray Firth as far as Buckie. In 1882 the Great North of Scotland applied for permission to build a 25 1/4-mile (40.6 km) line from Portsoy following the coast to Buckie and then running on to Elgin.

=== Great North of Scotland Railway ===
The GNoSR station opened as 'Findochty' on 1 May 1886 with the central section of the coast line, served by through Aberdeen to Elgin trains. In 1923 the Great North of Scotland Railway was absorbed by the London and North Eastern Railway. This was nationalised in 1948, and services provided by British Railways. The station and line was recommended for closure by Dr Beeching's in his report "The Reshaping of British Railways" and closed on 6 May 1968.

== Services ==
The GNoSR station was served by through trains running between Aberdeen and Elgin. There were no Sunday services.

== The station infrastructure ==
Findochty station had a single platform with the typical wooden station building. A cattle loading dock stood beyond the passenger platform with a single siding. The 1902 OS map shows a signal box on the end of the Portknockie side of the platform, a weighing machine in the goods yard and a station agent's or stationmaster's cottage at the entrance to the station. In 1928 the signal box had been removed. The line was 'dead straight' for a few miles running towards Portknockie.

The line was predominantly single track apart from a double track section between Buckie and Portessie. Track lifting took place shortly after closure in 1968.

=== Station remnants ===
Following a fire in 1975 the station was demolished and houses now occupy the site.

Preceding station	Historical railways	Following station
Portessie	Great North of Scotland	Portknockie
