= Buckie railway station =

Disused railway station in Scotland

Buckie
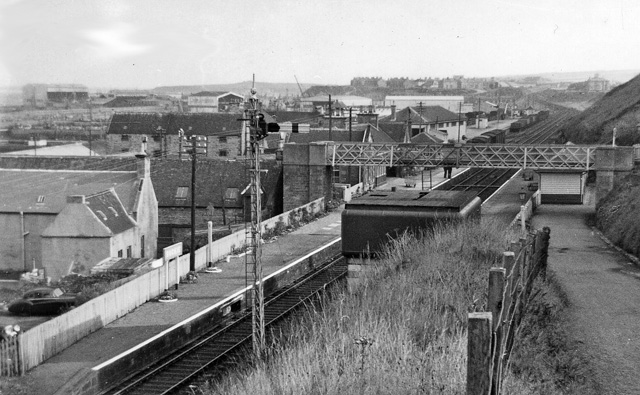
- Great North of Scotland station in 1961

General information
- Location: Buckie, Moray; Scotland
- Coordinates: 57.675°N 2.96°W
- Grid reference: NJ428657
- Platforms: 2

Other information
- Status: Disused

History
- Pre-grouping: Great North of Scotland Railway
- Post-grouping: London and North Eastern Railway

Key dates
- 1 May 1886: Great North of Scotland station opened
- 6 May 1968: Closed
Location

Buckie railway station was a railway station in Buckie, in current day Moray. The station was opened by the Great North of Scotland Railway (GNoSR) on its Moray Firth coast line in 1886, served by Aberdeen to Elgin trains.

The Highland Railway had opened their station named Buckie (H.R.) two years previously, on a branch from Keith, but this closed in 1915.

The GNoSR was absorbed by the London and North Eastern Railway in 1923 and became part of British Railways when the railways were nationalised in 1948. The station and line was recommended for closure by Dr Beeching's report "The Reshaping of British Railways" and closed on 6 May 1968.

== History ==
=== Background ===
The Great North of Scotland Railway introduced a bill to parliament in 1881 to extend its line from Portsoy along the Moray Firth to Buckie, and this was opposed by the Highland Railway and rejected. The following year both the Great North and Highland railways applied to parliament for permission, the Great North for a 25 1/4-mile (40.6 km) line from Portsoy along the coast through Buckie to Elgin, and the Highland for a branch from Keith to Buckie and Cullen. Authority was granted, but in the case of the Highland Railway only for a line as far as Portessie.

=== Great North of Scotland Railway ===
The GNoSR station opened on 1 May 1886 with the central section of the coast line, served by through Aberdeen to Elgin trains. In 1923 the Great North of Scotland Railway was absorbed by the London and North Eastern Railway. This was nationalised in 1948, and services provided by British Railways. The station and line was recommended for closure by Dr Beeching in his report "The Reshaping of British Railways" and closed on 6 May 1968.

== Services ==
The GNoSR station was served by four through trains a day between Aberdeen to Elgin. The speed of trains increased, so that in 1896 Locomotive Magazine was able to record a run from Aberdeen to Elgin that completed the 61 miles (98 km) in 1 1/4 hours.

In summer 1948, Buckie was served by four Aberdeen to Inverness trains, with Buckie about 2 1/2 hours from Aberdeen. There was also a mid-day Keith Town to Inverness service and an evening service from Aberdeen that terminated at Elgin. There were three services from Inverness to Aberdeen, a service from Lossiemouth and Elgin to Aberdeen and a Saturday service from Inverness to Keith that after 19 June was accelerated and extended to Aberdeen. There were no Sunday services.

Preceding station	Historical railways	Following station
Rathven	Highland; 1884–1915	Portessie
Buckpool	Great North of Scotland	Portessie
