= Portknockie railway station =

Former railway station in Scotland

Portknockie

General information
- Location: Portknockie, Moray; Scotland
- Coordinates: 57.701925°N 2.864259°W
- Grid reference: NJ 48589 68341
- Platforms: 2

Other information
- Status: Disused

History
- Pre-grouping: Great North of Scotland Railway
- Post-grouping: London and North Eastern Railway

Key dates
- 1 May 1886: Great North of Scotland station opened
- 6 May 1968: Closed
Location

Portknockie railway station was a railway station that served the small fishing village of Portknockie, close to Cullen in Moray. The railway station was opened by the Great North of Scotland Railway (GNoSR) on its Moray Firth coast line in 1886, served by Aberdeen to Elgin trains.

In 1923, the GNoSR became part of the London and North Eastern Railway and at nationalisation in 1948 became part of British Railways. The line was recommended for closure by Dr Beeching's report "The Reshaping of British Railways" and closed on 6 May 1968.

== History ==
=== Background ===
In 1881, the Great North of Scotland Railway put a bill to parliament to extend its Portsoy line along the Moray Firth as far as Buckie. In 1882, the Great North of Scotland applied for permission to build a 25 1/4-mile (40.6 km) line from Portsoy following the coast to Buckie and then running on to Elgin.

=== Great North of Scotland Railway ===
The GNoSR station opened as 'Portknockie' on 1 May 1886 with the central section of the coast line, served by through Aberdeen to Elgin trains. In 1923, the Great North of Scotland Railway was absorbed by the London and North Eastern Railway. This was nationalised in 1948, and services were provided by British Railways. The station and line was recommended for closure by Dr Beeching's in his report "The Reshaping of British Railways" and closed on 6 May 1968.

== Services ==
The GNoSR station was served by through trains running between Aberdeen and Elgin. There were no Sunday services.

== The station infrastructure ==
Portknockie station had a single platform with the typical wooden station building, a passing loop and two platforms that were offset, connected by a pedestrian overbridge. The 1902 OS map shows a signal box on the end of the Findochty platform and another on the Cullen end of the other platform, a weighing machine in the goods yard, a single siding and a loading dock in line with the village side platform and a station agent's or stationmaster's cottage near the entrance to the station. In 1930 one signal box had been removed.

The line was predominantly single track apart from a double track section between Buckie and Portessie. Track lifting took place shortly after closure in 1968.

=== Station remnants ===
The station was demolished and houses now occupy the site.

== Moray Coast Ride ==
Much of the trackbed of the old railway now forms the Sustrans Moray Cycle Route.

Preceding station	Historical railways	Following station
Findochty	Great North of Scotland	Cullen
