= Clandestine church =

Secret places of worship by religious minorities

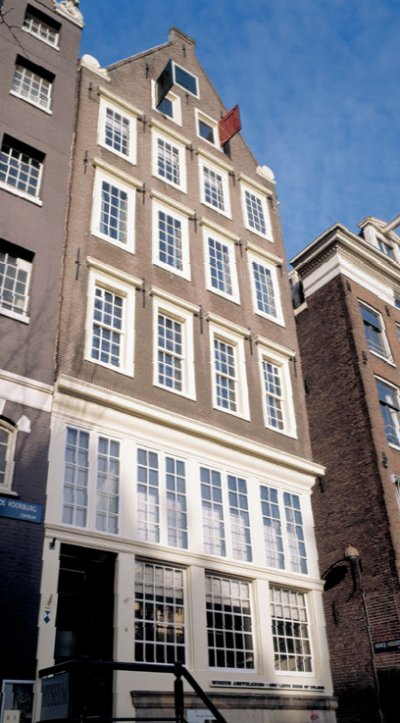
Ons' Lieve Heer op Solder is a house church on the top three floors of this canal house in Amsterdam.

A clandestine church (Dutch: schuilkerk), defined by historian Benjamin J. Kaplan as a "semi-clandestine church", is a house of worship used by religious minorities whose communal worship is tolerated by those of the majority faith on condition that it is discreet and not conducted in public spaces. Schuilkerken are commonly built inside houses or other buildings, and do not show a public façade to the street. They were an important advance in religious tolerance in the wake of the Reformation, an era when worship services conducted by minority faiths were often banned and sometimes penalized by exile or execution.

== History ==
According to historian Benjamin Kaplan, clandestine churches became common in Europe in the wake of the Reformation as a way for governments to permit a degree of religious toleration for minority Christian denominations and Jews. Both political and religious considerations frequently led governments to ban all worship not sanctioned by the state, and in many countries, members of minority religions worshiped together in total secrecy, risking punishment by the state. However, such a regime was frequently difficult to enforce, and as a result, while many jurisdictions permitted only one form of worship, authorities knowingly permitted members of minority faiths to worship privately. In others, the law permitted public worship by minority faiths, but only if it was more or less invisible to the general public.

The 1648 Treaty of Osnabruck, part of the Peace of Westphalia, specified three types of worship: "domestic devotion", public religious services ("exercitium religionis publicum"), and private religious services ("exercitium religionis privatum"). It is into this last category that clandestine churches fall. These churches were characterized by group religious services carried out by clergy "in their own houses or in other houses designated for the purpose," and not "in churches at set hours." Kaplan writes that the pretense of clandestinity "enabled Europeans to accommodate dissent without confronting it directly, to tolerate knowingly what they could not bring themselves to accept fully."

In a surviving Dutch document from 1691, the Regents of the City of Amsterdam specified the terms under which a Catholic church, called the Glabais, could be built by the Franciscans "to avoid giving any offense." The entrance must not be on the Jodenbreestraat, but "behind" on a lesser thoroughfare, the Burgwal. There would be no parking of sleds on the Jodenbreestraat. There was to be no "waiting for another person" on the street after services. The priest was responsible for seeing that no beggars came to ask the worshipers for alms. Services were timed so that there would be no chance of Roman Catholics offending Protestants by meeting them in the streets on their way to Dutch Reformed churches. And, finally, the Catholics must not walk to church in groups, nor carry prayer books, rosaries, or "other offensive objects" in a manner that made them visible to Protestant eyes. Kaplan regards these requirements as typical of those in effect across Europe wherever clandestine churches were permitted.

In 1701, the intendant of Alsace, Félix Le Pelletier de La Houssaye ruled against a complaint brought by an abbe, writing that "The worship which the Jews established in Reichshoffen is not as public as one would have you believe. There is no synagogue per se, only, by a custom long established in this province, when there are seven Jewish families in one locale, those who compose them assemble, without scandal, in a house of their sect for readings and prayers." A line was crossed when an actual building was erected as a prayer house, as the Jews of Biesheim, Wintzenheim, and Hagenthal discovered when each community had a newly built synagogue razed by the Conseil Souverain of Alsace in the 1720s.

Although early clandestine churches were makeshift spaces, by the 17th century some, usually Catholic, churches had constructed elaborately decorated baroque interiors. Artists who painted works commissioned by clandestine churches include Gerard van Honthorst, Abraham Bloemaert, Jan Miense Molenaer, Pieter de Grebber, Claes Corneliszoon Moeyaert and Jan de Bray.

In 1781, under the Patent of Toleration, the Austrian Empire for the first time instituted limited legal toleration of minority faiths, permitting them to conduct "private religious exercises" in clandestine churches. Emperor Joseph II's Patent specified that these clandestine churches might not ring a bell or build bell towers or any public entrance on the street. Vienna's Stadttempel, a synagogue built in 1825 with an extremely handsome interior, is an excellent surviving example. It is completely concealed in the interior of a block of residential buildings.

== Types ==
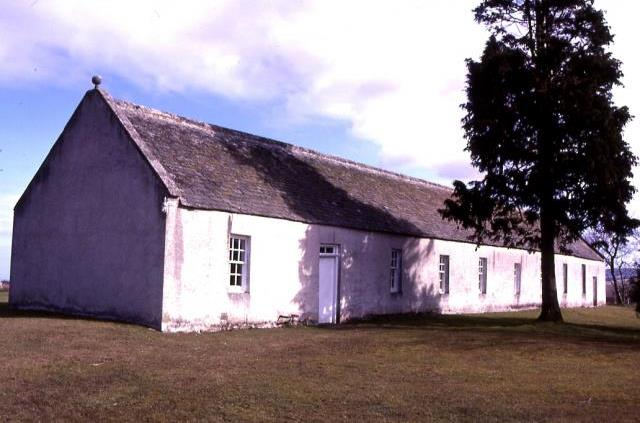
St. Ninian's Church, Tynet, a rural clandestine Catholic church built to resemble a barn

Some are freestanding buildings constructed in rear courtyards. What they share is that they are not readily recognizable as houses of worship by passersby. Such churches were built in large numbers during the time of the Dutch Republic for use by Catholics, Remonstrants, Lutherans, and Mennonites. In cities schuilkerken were especially established in houses and warehouses, whereas in the countryside such churches generally had the appearance of a shed and so became known as Schuurkerken (barn churches). All clandestine churches of necessity lacked exterior markers that would identify them as churches; they had no bells, towers, steeples, crosses, icons or exterior architectural splendor.

=== Rural ===
St. Ninian's Church, Tynet, Scotland, is a typical, rural clandestine Catholic church. Built in 1755, it resembles a long, low barn. It is a dramatic contrast with its replacement, St. Gregory's Church, Preshome, Scotland, the first openly Catholic church to be built in Scotland after the Reformation, whose proud Italian Baroque façade with the date in Latin, "DEO 1788", announces its Catholicism to the world.

=== Freestanding urban ===
Amsterdam's Vrijburg (1629) is a typical freestanding, urban clandestine church. It is built at the center of the block, completely surrounded by houses on all four sides, so that it neither fronts on, nor is visible from, any public street.

=== House churches ===
The church Ons' Lieve Heer op Solder in Amsterdam, currently a museum, is a notable example of a house Catholic church. A Jewish house synagogue survives in Traenheim in Alsace. It is an upstairs room in a half-timbered house renovated for use as a place of public worship in 1723 over the "vociferous" objections of the town's pastor but with the permission of the government. The room still has Hebrew prayers on the walls.

== See also ==
- Barn church
- Embassy chapel
- House church
