= Aultmore railway station =

Former railway station in Moray, Scotland

Aultmore

General information
- Location: Aultmore, Moray; Scotland
- Coordinates: 57.56580°N 3.00126°W
- Grid reference: NJ401532
- Platforms: 2

Other information
- Status: Disused

History
- Original company: Highland Railway
- Pre-grouping: Highland Railway
- Post-grouping: London, Midland and Scottish Railway

Key dates
- 1 January 1884: Station opens as Forgie
- 1 January 1899: Renamed Aultmore
- 9 August 1915: Station closes to passengers
- 3 October 1966: Station closes totally
Location

Aultmore railway station was a station which served the village of Aultmore, in the Scottish county of Moray. It was served by trains on the Buckie and Portessie Branch north of Keith. The latter station is now the nearest to Aultmore. Until 1 January 1899 the station was known as Forgie.

== History ==
Opened by the Highland Railway in 1884 it had a short life, the line closing to passengers in 1915. Aultmore became the terminus of a goods spur from Keith and continued this role until 1966. Alexander Macrae was the stationmaster appointed on 28 October 1904 having been promoted from Inverness station and remaining until closure on 7 August 1915.

== Infrastructure ==
The station had two platforms and loop line with originally a goods siding and loading dock to the north, later a second loading dock and sidings were added on the "down" side. The station building was on the "up" side and was 2.5 miles from Keith railway station. A stationmasters' house was provided as was a porters' house. Located on a gradient of 1 in 60 the gradient eased a little to the north at 1 in 70. On 7 November 1917 the Admiralty requisitioned the track between Aultmore and Portessie for use at Invergordon and Inverness however in June 1918 they also lifted the track between Aultmore and Crooksmill, leaving however the station buildings and sidings intact.

In June 1919 the Highland Railway relaid the section to Aultmore from Crooksmill and resumed goods services at the request of the local authorities. In 1925 the station buildings were restored however they were never used for passenger services. In 1937 the track was simplified and realigned to provide a layout of just two sidings and by this time the platforms had been reduced to just banks of earth. By 10 December 1937 the track between Aultmore and Buckie had once again been lifted. The Keith signal lineman made regular visits to Aultmore to maintain the ground lever frame and the Distillery Manager's Office had a railway telephone for the purposes of ordering the delivery of waggons.

=== Signalling ===
Signalling was by block telegraph and semaphore signals with the first section being Keith West to Forgie (Aultmore), followed by Forgie (Aultmore) to Enzie. The line was usually worked on a 'one engine in steam' principle, special trains being timed so as not to conflict with the regular timetabled services.

== Services ==
The timetable for the first regular services shows four trains in each direction however as they were all "mixed" trains the passengers were required to wait whilst shunting of goods waggons took place. In 1907 the summer timetable showed five trains in each direction, reducing to three in the winter.

A 12:50 pm goods train ran from Portessie to work the goods stations at Buckie and Aultmore, the local goods from Keith being withdrawn. From 1 November 1907 the engine was withdrawn from Portessie and instead a 2:15 pm ran to Aultmore to work the goods station as and when required. A daily 5:00 pm return goods ran from 1919 Services were suspended between 1943 and 1945 and finally ceased in 1966.

== The site today ==
The stationmasters' house is in use as a private home.

Preceding station	Historical railways	Following station
Keith Junction	Highland Railway; Buckie and Portessie Branch	Enzie
