= Barn church =

Type of clandestine church

A barn church or barn chapel is a specific type of clandestine church, built in times that a certain church was illegal but tolerated as long as the churches were not specifically looking like churches. These were no elaborate buildings but simple structures without pews. They were designed to hold rather large kneeling and standing congregations.

In rural areas those clandestine churches usually mimicked a barn, hence the name. In towns and cities people were more creative, hiding churches in houses and warehouses.

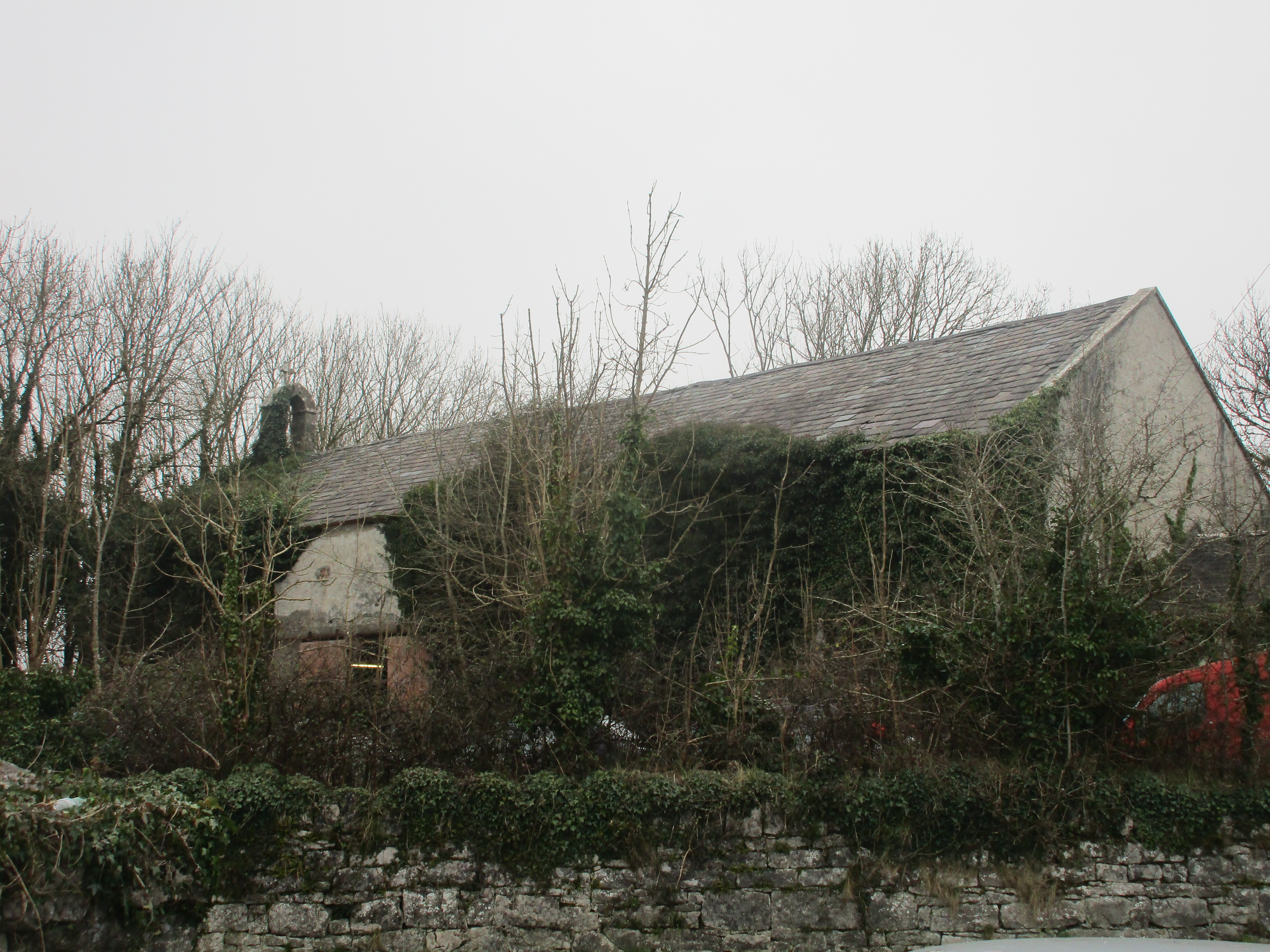
Former barn church in Kilnaboy, County Clare, Ireland

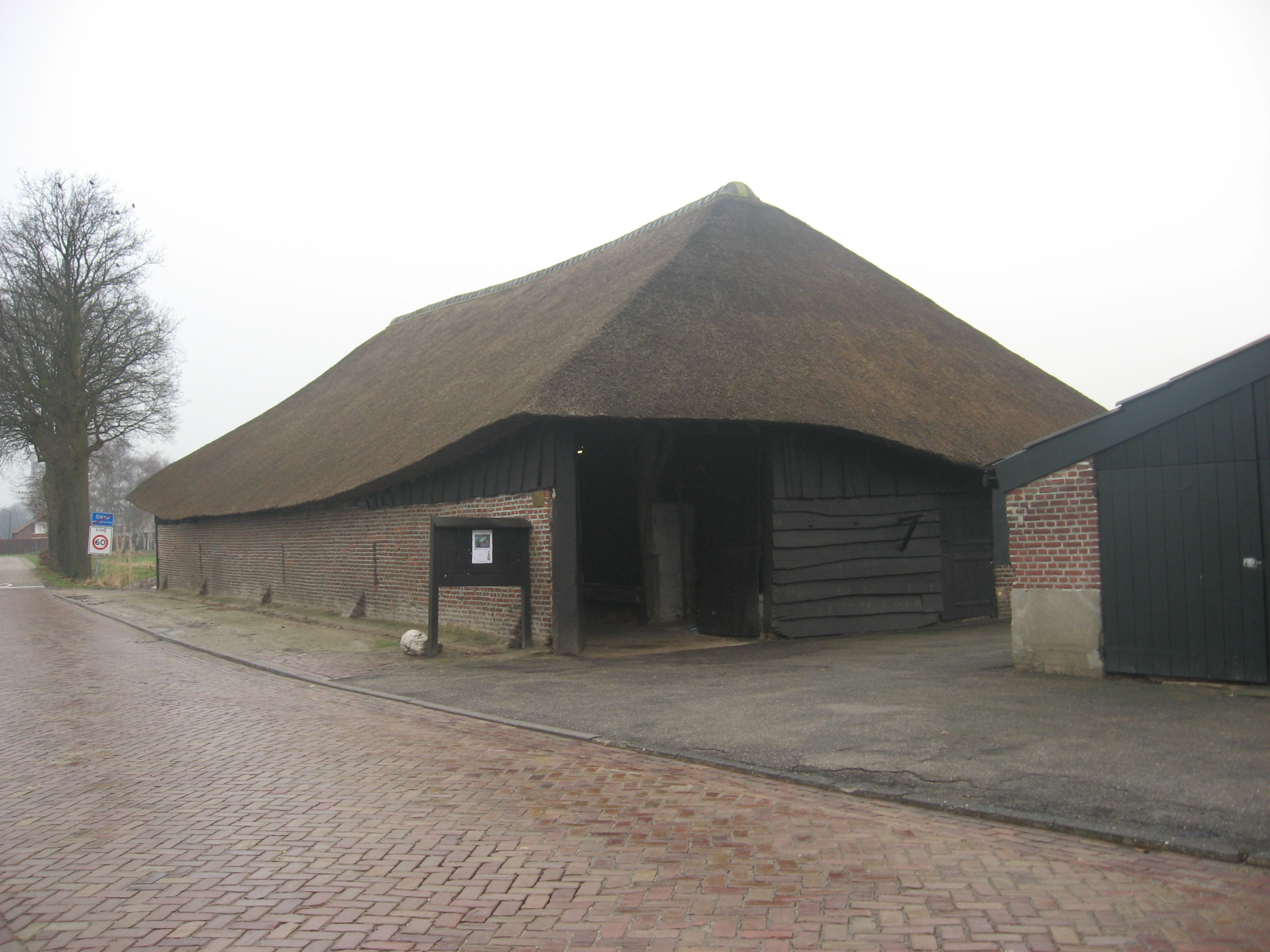
Example of a former Barn church in The Netherlands
