= Félix Le Pelletier de La Houssaye =

French politician (1663–1723)

Félix Le Pelletier de la Houssaye (25 March 1663, Paris – 20 September 1723, Paris) was a French statesman who became Controller-General of Finances.

From a family with a long history of service to the French king, Le Pelletier de la Houssaye held several posts, including Intendant (representative of the royal power in the provinces), a post he held in Soissons (1694), at Montauban in Rouergue (1698 - 1700) and at Strasbourg in Alsace (1700 - 1715).

Under the Regency, the protection of d'Aguessau allowed him to enter the entourage of Philippe II, Duke of Orléans, whose properties he administered.

After the flight of John Law, he was named Controller-General of Finances on 12 December 1720. He also became Provost and Master of Ceremonies of the Order of the Holy Spirit on 25 March 1721.

In 1701, while Intendant of Alsace, Le Pelletier de la Houssaye issued a ruling permitting Jewish worship in clandestine synagogues in response to a complaint brought by an abbé. It reads, "The worship which the Jews established in Reichshoffen is not as public as one would have you believe. There is no synagogue per se, only, by a custom long established in this province, when there are seven Jewish families in one locale, those who compose them assemble, without scandal, in a house of their sect for readings and prayers."

== Sources ==
A. de Maurepas and A.Boulant, Les ministres et les ministères du siècle des Lumières, 1715-1789, Paris : Christian, 1996
