= Vrijburg =

Historic clandestine church in Amsterdam

Coordinates: 52°22′38″N 4°53′14″E

Vrijburg is a historic clandestine church concealed behind a row of houses fronting on the Keizersgracht, Amsterdam. It is situated in the center of the block, with houses on all four sides and no frontage on any public street.

Vrijburg was built between 1629 and 1631 to serve Amsterdam's Remonstrant Protestants, who were not allowed to hold worship services in a manner visible by the public. Unlike many clandestine churches, the Vrijburg is a substantial, freestanding building. It is a two-story building with arched windows and even a small rose window made of brick over frame. The elegant, basilica form neoclassical interior has two sets of galleries. To secure its position, the congregation acted over time to purchase almost all of the surrounding houses, one served as a parsonage and the others were hired out.

Nowadays, the building houses the debating center "Rode Hoed".
