= St Ninian's Church, Tynet =

Roman Catholic church in Moray, Scotland

Coordinates: 57.6369°N 3.0420°W

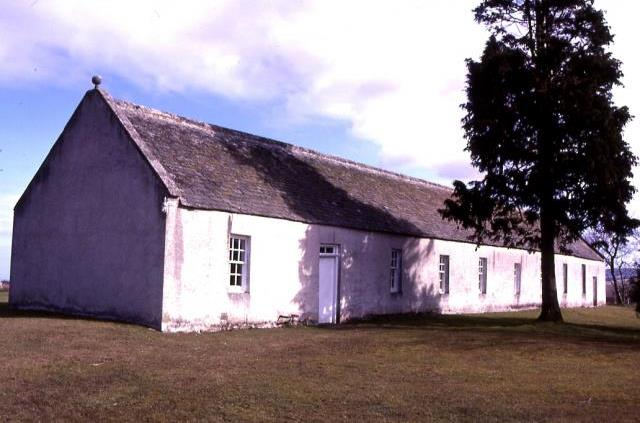

St Ninian's Church, Tynet is a historic Roman Catholic clandestine church located at Tynet about 4 miles to the west of Buckie, Scotland in the Enzie region. Erected in 1755, it is the oldest surviving Roman Catholic church built in Scotland after the Reformation.

== Architecture ==
St Ninian's looks like a long, low barn or like a row of simple cottages because it was a clandestine church designed to look anonymous at a time when Catholic worship was tolerated in Britain and many other Protestant lands on the condition that worship take place in out-of-the way churches so as not to offend Protestant sensibilities. St Ninian's is a superbly preserved example of a clandestine church. The church has a simple whitewashed interior with a foyer and a single large room. A possibly reused doorway with Corinthian columns leads from the foyer and baptistry to the church proper. The simple wooden pews and confessional are painted grey. A simple octagonal pulpit with a sounding board dates to 1787.

== History ==
St Ninian's replaced a church located in St Ninian's burial ground, Chapelford, destroyed by soldiers in 1728. Before the construction of St Ninian's, services were held on an occasional basis, often at night in barns conducted by priests who travelled disguised as farmers.

At the time the church was constructed, the building was an extremely modest private house owned by a "poor woman." Although the existence of a Roman Catholic congregation and the fact that they intended to construct a space in which to conduct communal worship was not a secret, in keeping with the conditions under which Catholic worship was tolerated in Scotland, Father Godsman purchased the house, on land owned by the Gordon family, and announced that he was "making an additione (sic) as a cot for his sheep." In its original form, the building was thatched and the windows were not glazed. Glass windows and a slate roof were added by Father George Matheson in 1779, as conditions eased for Roman Catholics in Scotland. Father Matheson added a ball finial on the building's west gable. The building was restored in 1951.

St Ninian's is still a consecrated church, although it was supplanted as the leading church in the parish by St Gregory's, Preshome in 1788. The church is protected as a category A listed building.
