= Aultmore =

Coordinates: 57.566°N 03.001°W

Aultmore: Scottish Gaelic: An t-Allt Mòr
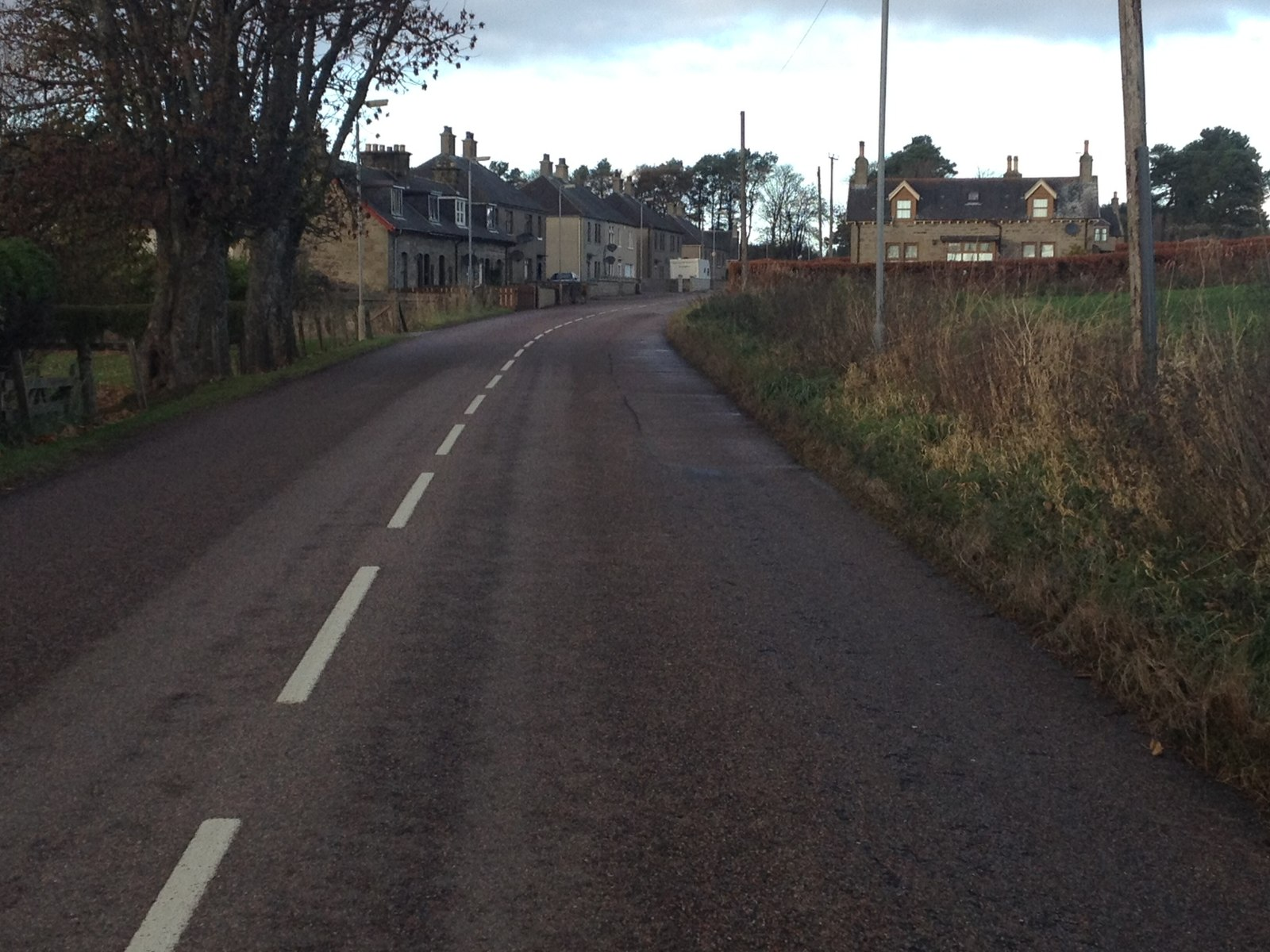
- B9016 at Aultmore

- Location within Moray
- OS grid reference: NJ4053
- Council area: Moray
- Lieutenancy area: Banffshire
- Country: Scotland
- Sovereign state: United Kingdom
- Police: Scotland
- Fire: Scottish
- Ambulance: Scottish

Aultmore (from Scottish Gaelic "An t-Allt Mòr", meaning the "Big Burn") is a village in Moray, Scotland, near Keith.
