= Rathven =

Coordinates: 57.678°N 2.934°W

Rathven: Scottish Gaelic: An Rathan; Scots: Raffin
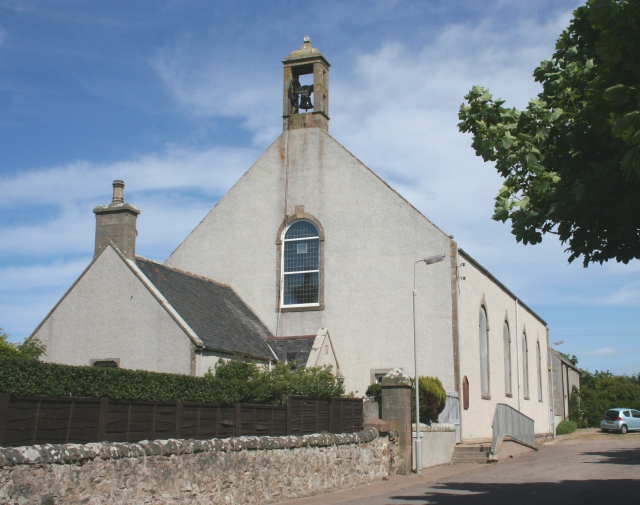
- Rathven Kirk

- Location within Moray
- OS grid reference: NJ444657
- Council area: Moray
- Lieutenancy area: Banffshire
- Country: Scotland
- Sovereign state: United Kingdom
- Post town: BUCKIE
- Postcode district: AB56
- Dialling code: 01542
- Police: Scotland
- Fire: Scottish
- Ambulance: Scottish
- UK Parliament: Aberdeenshire North and Moray East
- Scottish Parliament: Moray

Rathven (Scots: Raffin, Scottish Gaelic: An Rathan, meaning the fortlet) is an ecclesiastical parish, village and former civil parish in the historic County of Banff, now in Moray, Scotland. The civil parish was last used as a census subdivision in 2001, with a population of 12,378, The former burgh of Buckie is the largest settlement in the parish, which also includes Findochty and Portknockie.

== Churches ==
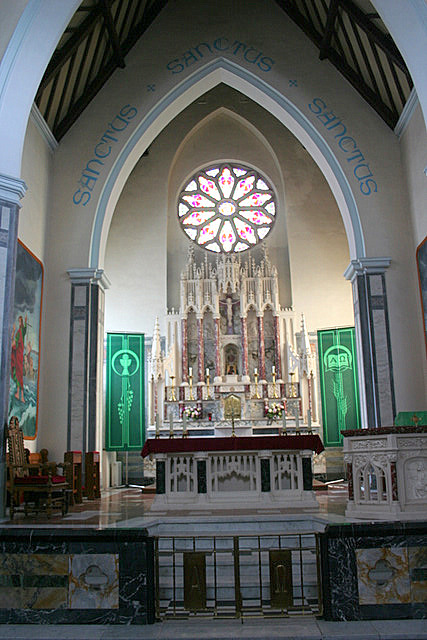
View of the altar of St. Peter's Church, Rathven

A medieval church dedicated to St Peter was built before the Reformation. The Rannas Aisle of 1612 is all that remains of the early church. This was built by the Hays of Rannas.

In 1224, John Bisset, linked to the church, built a leper hospital. This was later converted into a Bedesman Hospital. At the time of the Reformation the church was under the control of St Mary's Collegiate Church in Cullen.

The Roman Catholic St Peter's Church is in the town of Buckie. It is sometimes inaccurately referred to as a cathedral. St Gregory's Church, Preshome and St Ninian's Church, Tynet are served from here. The church was built in 1851–7 to a design by Bishop James Kyle and Alexander and William Reid. In 1907 the chancel, altar and baptistry were altered by Charles Jean Ménart, who also designed St Aloysius Church, Glasgow.

== Notable people ==
George Hay was the first post-Reformation minister of the parish and served as Moderator of the General Assembly of the Church of Scotland in March 1571.

Rev William Scrogie, minister from 1649 to 1667, leaving to take his position as Bishop of Argyll.

The Addison family in Rathven can be traced back to the 17th century and this branch includes the Canadian-Czech philanthropist, Vincent Peter Addison (d. 2007) and the travel writer, David M. Addison whose latest work "Confessions of a Banffshire Loon" contains much information about the Addisons of Rathven as well as the Addisons of nearby Portknockie where Joseph Addison was the first Provost. There are also a couple of chapters on the Gordons of Letterfourie who were the lairds of Rathven.

== See also ==
- Rathven railway station
