= St Gregory's Church, Preshome =

Catholic church in Moray, Scotland

Coordinates: 57°38′21″N 2°59′24″W

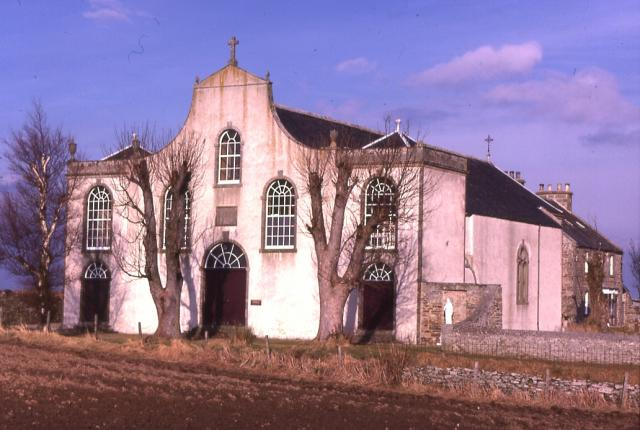
St. Gregory's Church, Preshome

St. Gregory's Church is a Roman Catholic church at Preshome near Buckie in north-east Scotland. It is protected as a category A listed building.

Built in 1788, St. Gregory's was the first church building to be openly built by Catholics in Scotland since the Reformation of 1560. Catholic worship had previously been confined to private homes and clandestine churches. St Ninian's, a Catholic church at nearby Tynet, was erected in 1755 but was built to resemble a cottage.

The design of the church was intended to make a statement of the pride that Catholics took in their faith. Therefore, the church has an elegant Italian Baroque façade that proclaims its Catholicism by being stylistically unique in Scotland. The pedimented gable sports classical urn finials and the Latin date "DEO 1788." The design of the church has been credited to Father John Reid, with later additions by Peter Paul Pugin. Inside, the reredos incorporates a painting of St Gregory by Caracci, a gift from the Earl of Findlater.
