= Benjamin J. Kaplan =

American historian (born 1960)

Benjamin Jacob Kaplan (born 31 January 1960) is a historian and professor of Dutch history at University College London and the University of Amsterdam.

He taught at University of Iowa. He is a 2011 Guggenheim Fellow.

According to The New York Times, in his 2007 book Religious Conflict and the Practice of Toleration in Early Modern Europe, Kaplan "maintains that religious toleration declined from around 1550 to 1750," and that Europeans responded by devising "intricate boundaries allowing them to live more or less peaceably with neighbors whose rival beliefs were anathema."

He received his PhD from Harvard University.

== Books ==
- Divided by Faith: Religious Conflict and the Practice of Toleration in Early Modern Europe. Harvard University Press. 2007. ISBN 978-0-674-02430-4.
- Calvinists and Libertines: confession and community in Utrecht, 1578-1620, Clarendon Press, 1995, ISBN 978-0-19-820283-7
- Benjamin J. Kaplan; Marybeth Carlson; Laura Cruz, eds. (2009). Boundaries and their meanings in the history of the Netherlands. BRILL. ISBN 978-90-04-17637-9.
- Benjamin J. Kaplan, Bob Moore, Henk Van Nierop, Judith Pollmann, (eds.) Catholic Communities in Protestant States: Britain and the Netherlands C.1570-1720, Manchester University Press, 2009, ISBN 978-0-7190-7906-1
