= Keith railway station =

Railway station in Moray, Scotland

Keith Scottish Gaelic: Baile Chè
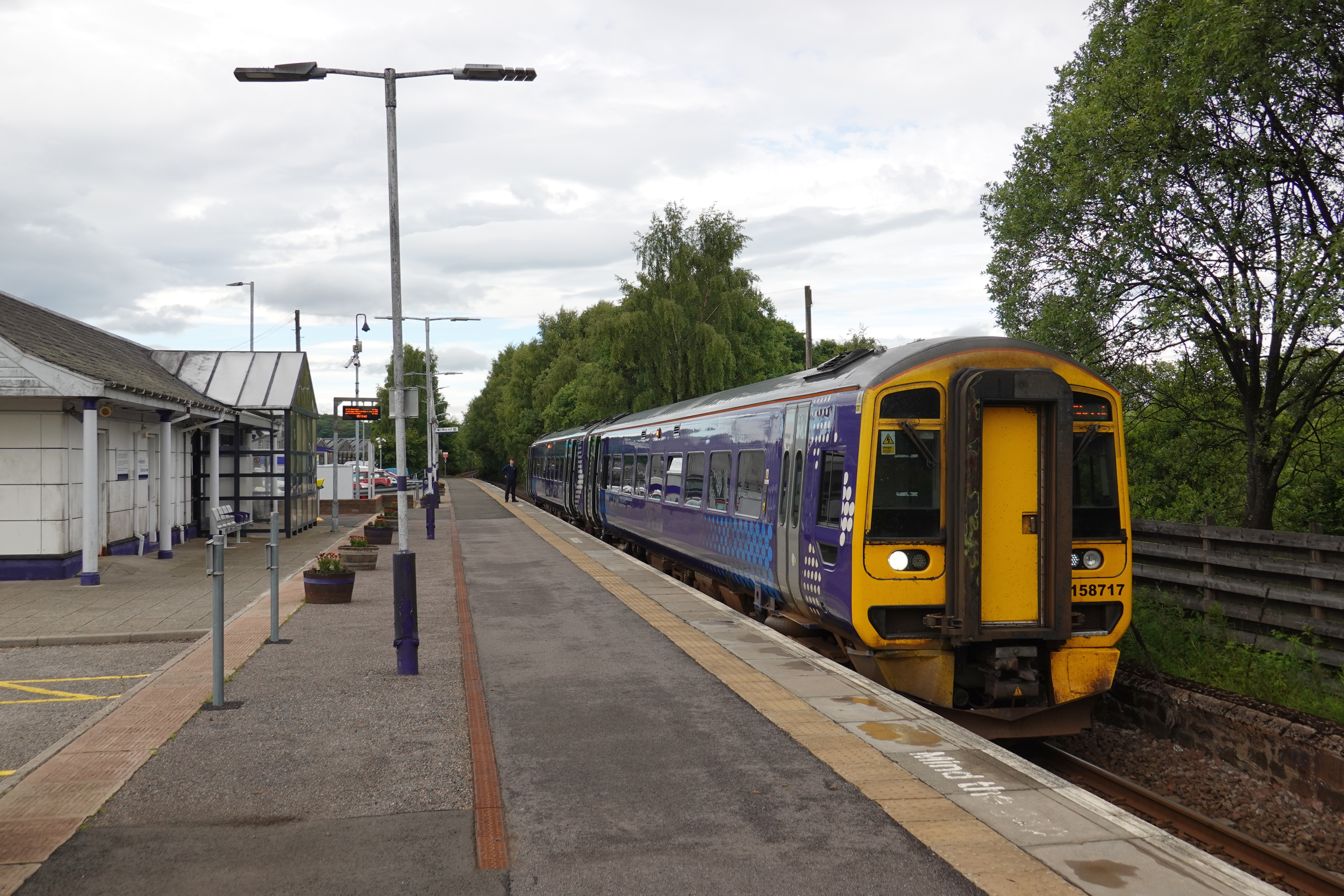

General information
- Location: Keith, Moray; Scotland
- Coordinates: 57.5514°N 2.9542°W
- Grid reference: NJ430516
- Managed by: ScotRail
- Platforms: 1

Other information
- Station code: KEH

History
- Original company: Great North of Scotland Railway
- Pre-grouping: Great North of Scotland Railway, Highland Railway
- Post-grouping: London, Midland and Scottish Railway

Key dates
- 10 October 1856: Opened

Passengers
- 2020/21: ▼10,934
- 2021/22: ▲47,084
- 2022/23: ▲55,948
- 2023/24: ▲71,474
- 2024/25: ▲76,798
Location
Notes
- Passenger statistics from the Office of Rail and Road

Keith railway station is a railway station serving the town of Keith, Moray, Scotland. The station is managed by ScotRail and is on the Aberdeen to Inverness Line, between Huntly and Elgin, measured 53 miles 8 chains (85.5 km) from Aberdeen, or 30 miles 20 chains (48.7 km) from Forres.

== History ==
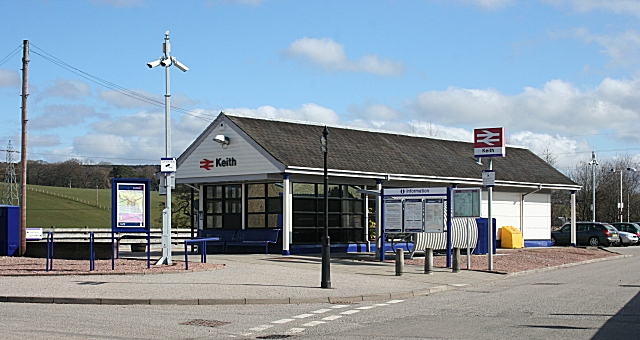
The exterior of the station

The station was originally owned by the Highland Railway and was known as Keith Junction, the line from the west having opened by the Inverness and Aberdeen Junction Railway in 1858 and becoming part of the Highland Railway in 1865. It was the point where the line from Inverness made an end-on junction with the Great North of Scotland Railway from Aberdeen (which opened in 1856) to enable exchange of goods and passengers. As built, it was located in the vee of the routes to Inverness and to Dufftown (which diverges to the southwest here) and had four platforms - one through one for each route, plus two east facing bays for GNSR services. It was taken over by the London, Midland and Scottish Railway at the 1923 Grouping and then became part of the Scottish Region of British Railways upon nationalisation in 1948.

Today only a single platform remains in full-time use, though the Dufftown branch platform (numbered 1) is available if required for turning back trains from the Aberdeen direction (though no trains are scheduled to do so in the current timetable). The bays have been filled in, having been abandoned and tracks lifted in the early 1970s after the closure of the Moray Coast Line (for which the station was a terminus). A signal box (which retains the name Keith Junction) remains at the eastern end to control a passing loop on the single track main line beyond the station, the now little-used goods yard (formerly used by trains accessing the nearby Chivas Regal whisky plant) and the stub of the Dufftown branch.

The Dufftown and Craigellachie line was closed to passengers by British Railways in May 1968 as a result of the Beeching Axe. The line has since been preserved as the Keith and Dufftown Railway (reopening in 2000/01), but the link between it and the national network was severed by Railtrack in 1998 - two 60-foot track panels having been removed as a condition of the transfer of the branch to the K&DR. The preservation society hopes to reinstate the connection and the still-extant but disused section beyond to Keith Town at some point in the future and run through trains from here to Dufftown, which would see platform 1 return to regular use. Discussions with regard to this were held between the K&DRA, the local MSP Richard Lochhead and Transport Scotland in the autumn of 2015.

The old station buildings were replaced by new ones in 1988 in a rebuilding programme costing £200,000 (equivalent to £560,000 in 2025).

== Facilities ==
The station has good facilities for its rural location, with a part-time-staffed ticket office, accessible toilet, ticket machine, two car parks, bench, bike racks and help point. The station has four methods of step-free access.

== Passenger volume ==
Passenger Volume at Keith
	2004–05	2005–06	2006–07	2007–08	2008–09	2009–10	2010–11	2011–12	2012–13	2013–14	2014–15	2015–16	2016–17	2017–18	2018–19	2019–20	2020–21	2021–22	2022–23	2023–24	2024–25
Entries and exits	66,531	70,599	68,963	75,036	77,354	77,030	89,690	94,336	95,002	97,033	102,074	98,666	91,992	89,948	81,112	68,102	10,934	47,084	55,948	71,474	76,798

The statistics cover twelve month periods that start in April.

== Services ==
As of May 2026, there is a basic two-hourly frequency in each directions (with peak extras), to Inverness northbound and Aberdeen southbound, giving a total of 11 trains each way. The first departure to Aberdeen each weekday and Saturday continues south to Edinburgh Waverley. On Sundays there are five trains each way.

Preceding station	National Rail	Following station
Huntly	ScotRail; Aberdeen to Inverness Line	Elgin
	Historical railways	
Strathisla Mills	Great North of Scotland Railway; Keith and Dufftown Railway	Terminus

== Future Proposals ==
In addition to the potential reinstatement of the Dufftown branch, Transport Scotland have published proposals to improve the facilities here. This could see the existing passing loop extended through the station and a second platform built north of the current one. Other upgrades planned for the station include a bus interchange, taxi drop-off point and car park extension.
