= Buckie and Portessie Branch =

Railway line in Scotland

Overview
- Locale: Scotland
- Dates of operation: 1 August 1884–31 December 1922
- Successor: London Midland and Scottish Railway

Technical
- Track gauge: 4 ft 8 1/2 in (1,435 mm)

The Buckie and Portessie Branch was a railway branch line in Scotland, built by the Highland Railway to serve an important fishing harbour at Buckie, in Banffshire. It connected with the rival Great North of Scotland Railway at Portessie.

The line opened from Keith, in 1884, and it was 13 miles (21 km) in length. The fish traffic was significant, but there was little intermediate agricultural business; whisky distilleries were established from 1897 and provided useful business for the line.

In 1915 the government had the line closed to release the track, which was requisitioned for use in Admiralty sidings elsewhere. After 1919 consideration was given to reopening the entire line to all traffic, but this was never done, and only short lengths at each end operated to serve industrial premises. The entire line closed in 1966.

== Earlier railways ==
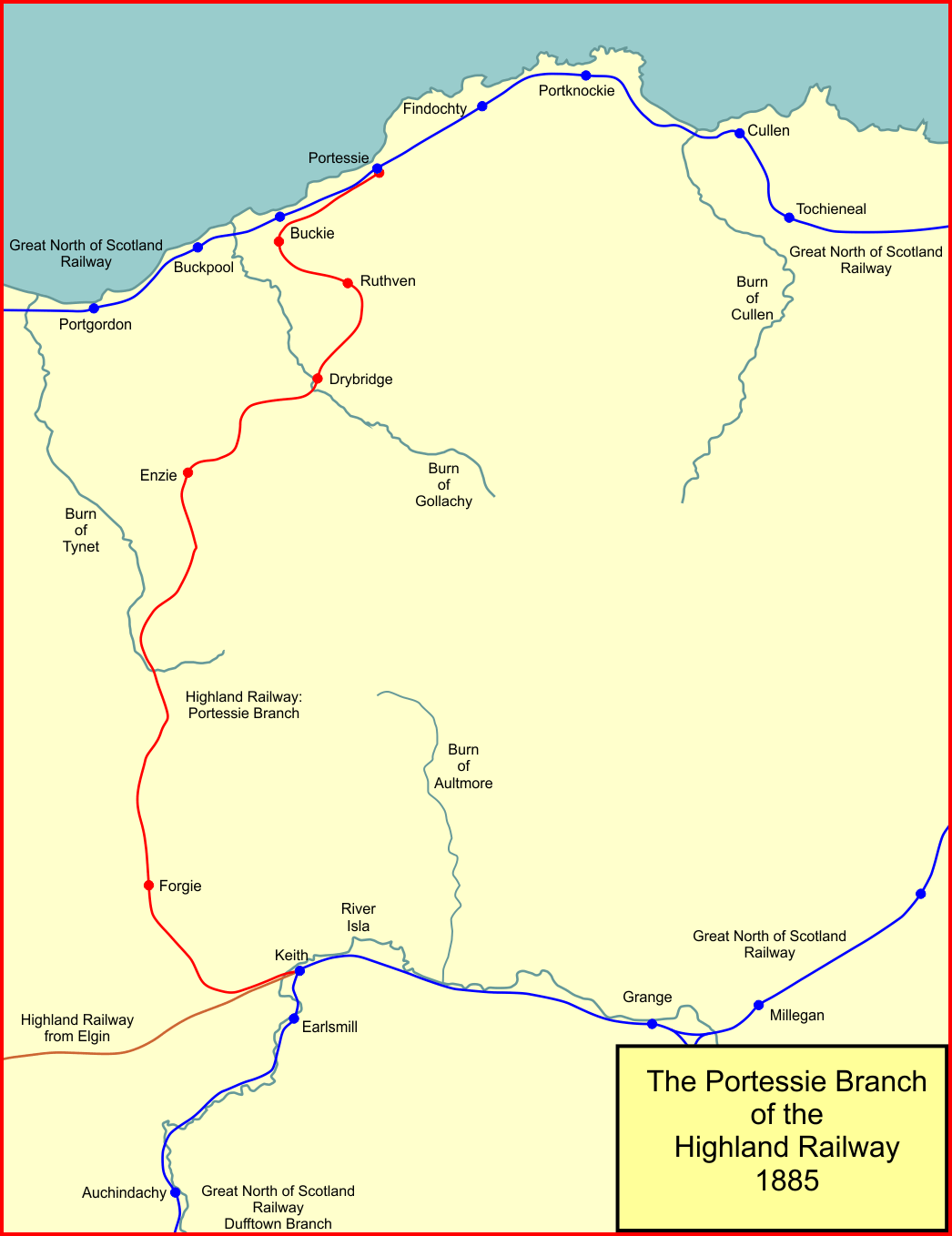
System map of the Buckie branch 1885

Aberdeen received a railway connection from the south in 1850. A connection to Inverness was seen as an important objective, and the Great North of Scotland Railway (GNoSR) was formed in 1845 to build a line between those places. However the cost would have been considerable, and the GNoSR was unable to raise the capital needed to build the line throughout. It resigned itself to building only from Aberdeen to Huntly, later extended to Keith. It reached Keith in 1856. Interests in Inverness were disappointed that they were to be deprived of a railway, and the formed a company to bridge the gap. At first this was the Inverness and Nairn Railway, opened in 1855. This was followed by the Inverness and Aberdeen Junction Railway (I&AJR) which took over the working of the Nairn company, and it operated trains from Inverness to Keith, joining the GNoSR there in 1858. For some time there were no through passenger trains, and passengers changed trains at Keith. The two companies, the GNoSR and the I&AJR had many disagreements, and their relationship was not harmonious.

As the point of linkage on the trunk line between Inverness and Aberdeen, Keith assumed a certain importance. Over time the network of routes in the area developed, and in particular, in 1863 the Inverness and Perth Junction Railway (I&PJR) was opened, from Forres southwards. It was friendly to the Inverness and Aberdeen Junction Railway, and therefore much important traffic was abstracted from the GNoSR. As a sort of retaliation, the GNoSR developed or encouraged other routes in the area, but without penetrating the Inverness companies' dominance in their own area. The I&AJR and the I&PJR merged in 1865 and the combined company formed the Highland Railway later the same year.

== A line to Buckie ==
In the 1860s three schemes were put forward sporadically to connect Buckie to the emerging railway network in the area, but none of these early schemes attracted much support.

The coastal region was the home to the herring fishing industry, but the absence of satisfactory harbour facilities and transport links limited it. In 1876 the Cluny Estates put in hand the construction of a harbour at Buckie; this was ready in 1880. It revolutionised the volume of fishing activity locally, immediately tripling the landings of herring. The establishment of the harbour encouraging the acquisition of larger fishing boats now that they did not have to be hauled up the foreshore; and trawling became the dominant method, bringing in a bigger catch than the former drifters. The rise in the fishing landings demanded a railway connection.

The Great North of Scotland Railway proposed a line running west along the coast from Portsoy, where it already had a branch terminus, to Portgordon. This would run through Buckie and incidentally connect numerous minor fishing locations in addition. A bill was submitted to Parliament for the 1881 session. The Highland Railway decided to oppose the bill for this line as a tactical measure, advocating a branch line from Keith to Portessie via Buckie. The GNoSR bill was thrown out in Parliament, with the preamble not proven.

The Highland Railway and the GNoSR considered their positions and both submitted bills for the 1882 session, and the agreed not to oppose one another's bills. The Highland proposed a line from Keith to Buckie and Portessie, extending eastward along the coast nearly to Cullen. The GNoSR scheme was for a line all along the coast from Portsoy to Elgin; this would be known as the Moray Coast Railway.

== Authorisation ==
Highland Railway Act 1882
- Act of Parliament
- Parliament of the United Kingdom
- Long title: An Act to authorise the Highland Railway Company to construct a railway from Keith to Buckie; and for other purposes.
- Citation: 45 & 46 Vict. c. cxxiv

Dates
- Royal assent: 12 July 1882

Text of statute as originally enacted

The two companies' bills went through, receiving royal assent on 12 July 1882 as the Highland Railway Act 1882 (45 & 46 Vict. c. cxxiv) and the Great North of Scotland (Buckie Extension) Railway Act 1882 (45 & 46 Vict. c. cxxvi); the Highland Buckie branch was to be 13 miles 3 furlongs (21.5 km) long. Additional share capital in the amount of £100,000 was authorised. The GNoSR route along the coast, authorised on the same day, was to be known as the Buckie Extension Railway; it would be over 25 miles (40 km) in length, including a long viaduct over the River Spey. The Highland Railway Act 1882's scheme did not now extend east of Portessie, obtaining running powers over the (future) GNoSR line instead. The GNoSR got running powers to Elgin over the Highland Railway line from Keith, a big prize for them. However each company's running powers did not come into effect unless both companies exercised them. The Highland certainly did not want the GNoSR over the main line to Elgin, so it did not exercise its own powers over the GNoSR line.

Ross comments on the uncertain purpose of the Highland's Buckie branch:

The 'HR Buckie Line' was intended to tap the fish trade of the Banffshire ports, but it is hard to see why it was thought necessary to build it. Some notion of making the most of the company's position at Keith presumably played a part, as well as a reluctance to see the Great North monopolise a rich fish trade.

The line climbed from the level of the River Spey at Keith to an altitude of 670 feet, through rather undeveloped country, then descending again to sea level at Buckie.

== Opening and early operation ==
Major Marindin made the usual inspection for the works for the Board of Trade on Wednesday 30 July 1884; he stated that he was satisfied with the works, and the line could be opened forthwith. The annual Keith Show was to take place on the following day, Thursday 31 July, and a heavily-patronised excursion ran from Portessie to Keith and back on that day. The ordinary public service started on Friday 1 August 1884. There were four mixed trains each way daily, with a journey time of 40 minutes, later eased to 50 minutes. A fish train (not requiring the Board of Trade consent) had been run on Tuesday 29 July.

Intermediate stations were at Forgie, Enzie, Rathven, and Buckie. Two crossing loops were provided, at Forgie and Enzie, but after an altercation with the Board of Trade, which demanded that the line should be worked by the staff system as well as by block telegraph, the Highland announced it would be worked by a single engine instead. The engine power was provided by one or more of three 2-4-0T locomotives that had been built by the Highland Railway at Lochgorm. They were later converted to 4-4-0Ts.

The inhabitants of Drybridge petitioned the Highland Railway board for a station, and this was agreed to. It opened on 1 April 1885. It was on a gradient of 1 in 60.

== Opening of the Great North of Scotland line ==
The Great North of Scotland Railway had its coast line authorised at the same time as the Highland branch, but the GNoSR line was considerably longer. It finally opened on 3 May 1886. It provided full station facilities at Portessie, and the Highland was allocated a platform there, in place of its primitive temporary station.

== Development of traffic ==
In July 1897 a new distillery at Aultmore started production. Its premises were adjacent to Forgie Station; two extra sidings were laid down to accommodate the distillery traffic. Houses were built there for the workers’ families, and on 1 January 1899, the name of Forgie station was changed to Aultmore.

== World War I ==
In July 1914, the hostilities of World War I started. Many young men joined the military, and this had a massive depletion effect on railway operation. The Highland Railway decided to close the Buckie branch to release men and matériel, and this took effect on 7 August 1915. However it was reported that the rolling stock released was no more than one engine, two passenger carriages, a passenger brake van and goods brake van.

After a few months a conditional (as required) goods service was reinstated on the branch. However in 1917 the Government ordered distilleries to cease production, and the residual goods business on the line was virtually nothing. The authorities now requisitioned the track and the end of that year, and it was removed; it was used on Admiralty lines on the Cromarty Firth.

At the cessation of hostilities, some reinstatement of track took place, and the line between Keith and Aultmore was back in operation at the end of 1919. Portessie to Buckie reopened on 3 November 1919, operated by the Great North of Scotland Railway, which had itself reinstated the track on the Highland Railway solum. Replacement of the track in the intervening gap was considered in 1920, but the Company decided against it.

== Grouping of the railways, and possible reopening throughout ==
In 1923 the railways of Great Britain were "grouped" into one or other of four new, large companies, by the force of the Railways Act 1921 (11 & 12 Geo. 5. c. 55). The Highland Railway was a constituent of the new London, Midland and Scottish Railway, while the GNoSR was a constituent of the London and North Eastern Railway (LNER).

Later in 1923 the question of reopening the entire branch was revived, and this time it was agreed to do it. Government grants assisted in this, and some requisitioned track was supplied, in some cases Midland Railway rails of better quality than the former Highland Railway material. However the anticipated reopening was repeatedly delayed.

In March 1926 a bus service started operation between Keith and Buckie. On 4 May 1926, railway workers participated in what became known as the General Strike, and the government encouraged the use of alternative forms of transport. This had the lasting effect of transferring business permanently away from rail. When the strike was over, the railway industry implemented deep economy measures, and the revival of the Keith to Portessie line was no longer possible.

From 10 April 1933 the LNER (former GNoSR) goods service to Buckie was transferred to the LNER station. In 1937 the track between Aultmore and Buckie was removed and sold; the stub from Buckie (exclusive) to Portessie had been laid by the GNoSR and was left for the time being.

During the first part of World War II, the Aultmore distillery continued to be served from the Keith end until 1943, when once again the Government required cessation of production. This was reinstated together with the rail service, in 1945.

== Nationalisation, and the end ==
In 1948 the railways were taken into national ownership, under British Railways. This seems to have triggered recovery of the stub of route at Portessie. The declining income from the residue of the branch line meant that final closure was inevitable, and on 3 October 1966 the whole line was closed.

== Locations ==
- Keith; Great North of Scotland Railway station;
- Forgie; opened 1 August 1884; renamed Aultmore 1 January 1899; closed 9 August 1915;
- Enzie; opened 1 August 1884; closed 9 August 1915;
- Drybridge; opened 1 April 1885; closed 9 August 1915;
- Rathven; opened 1 August 1884; closed 9 August 1915;
- Buckie; opened 1 August 1884; closed 9 August 1915;
- Portessie; temporary Highland Railway platform at first, opened 1 August 1884; closed 9 August 1915; then GNoSR station.
