= Portessie =

Fishing village in Scotland

Coordinates: 57.685°N 2.941°W

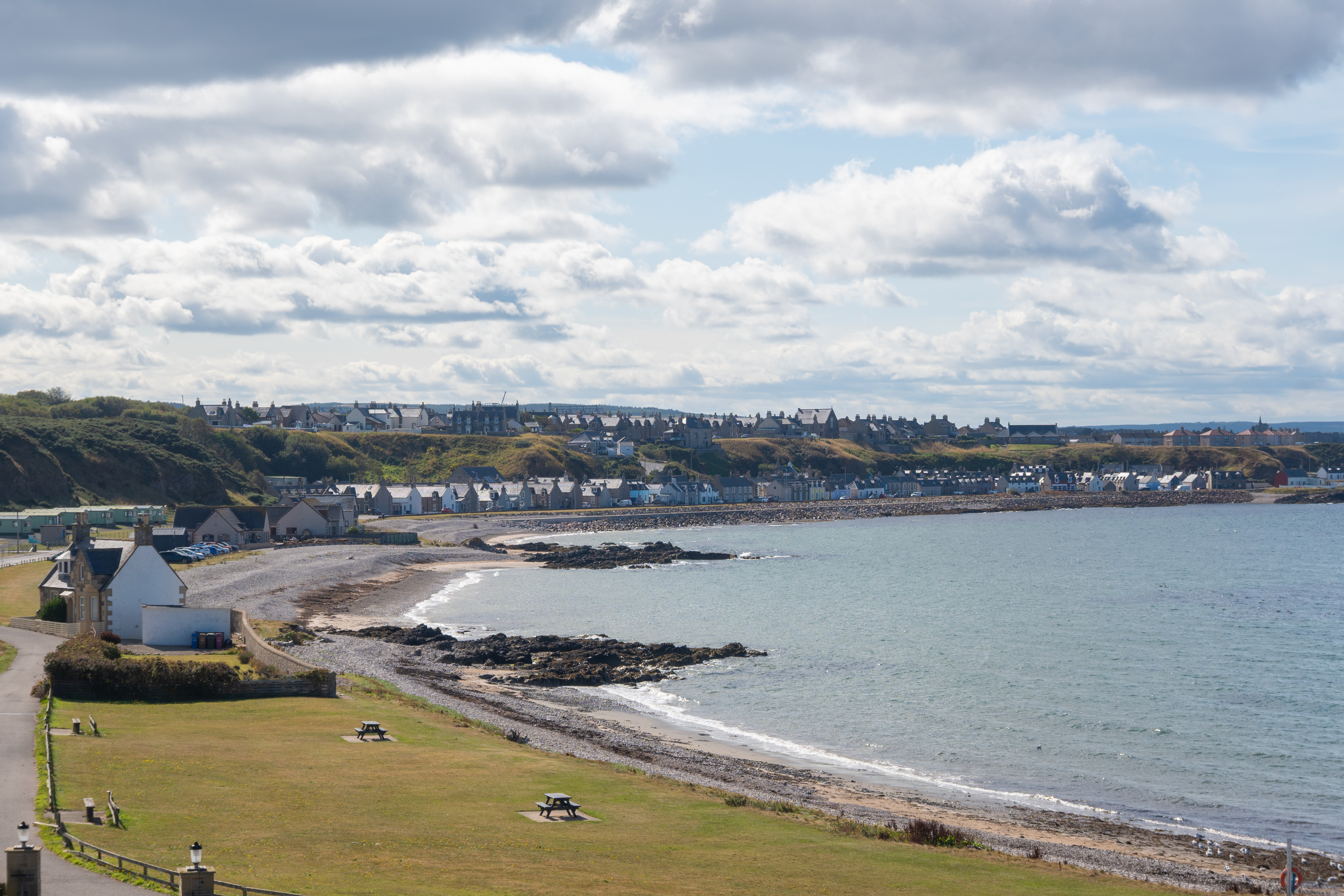
Portessie

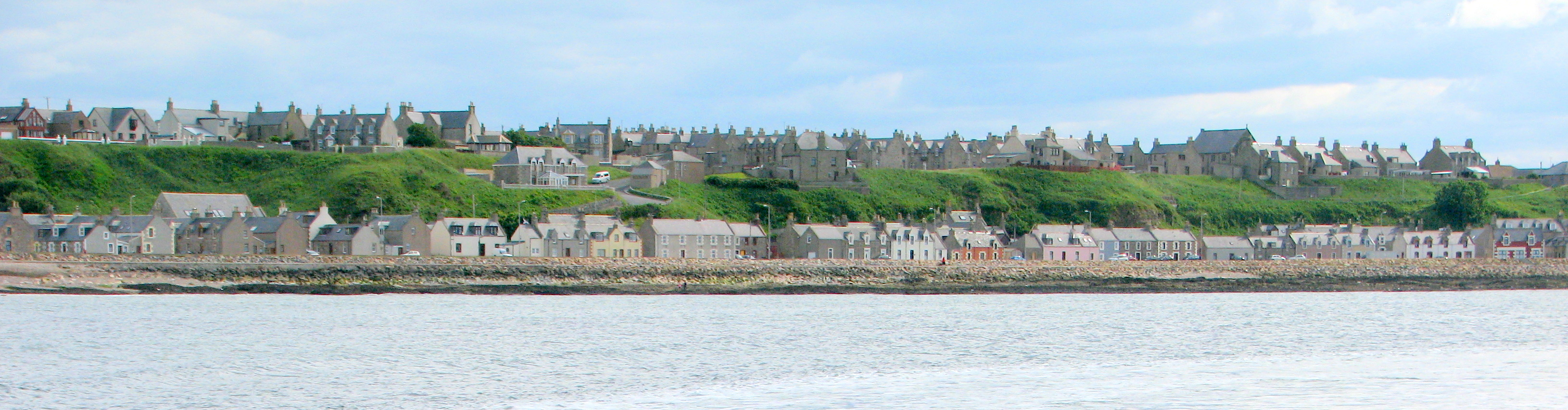
Panoramic view

Portessie (Scots: Peterhythe or The Sloch, Scottish Gaelic: An Sloc) is a small fishing village east of Buckie, on the north-east coast of Scotland between Buckie and Findochty.

== Fishing ==
The Annual Report of the Fishery Board for 1906 explains the mode of operation in Portessie: "No fish landed at this creek. Fishermen prosecute the fishing all the year round at other stations, and they had a prosperous season". In the report for 1907 we learn that "the fish caught by the fishermen of this creek are all landed at Buckie harbour. There were eight steam drifters built for this creek during the year, the fleet now comprising 23 vessels". In 1912, in a statement which covers all of the ports in the Buckie district, it is reported that "The majority of the fishermen are employed exclusively at herring fishing for the greater part of the year at the various centres in Scotland, England and Ireland. Line fishing is carried on by the older fishermen, who are employed more or less all the year round".

Fishery Statistics

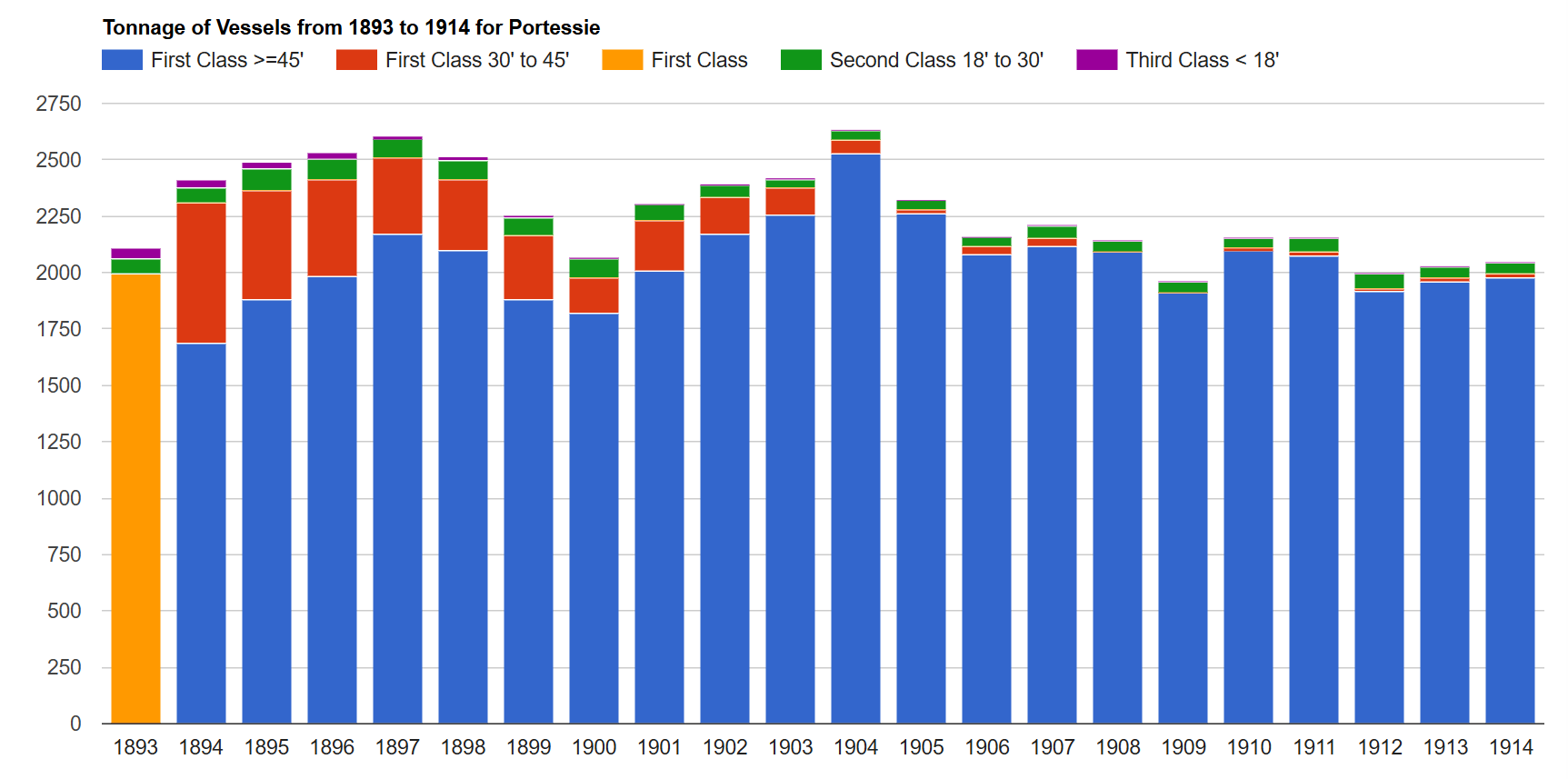
Tonnage of vessels

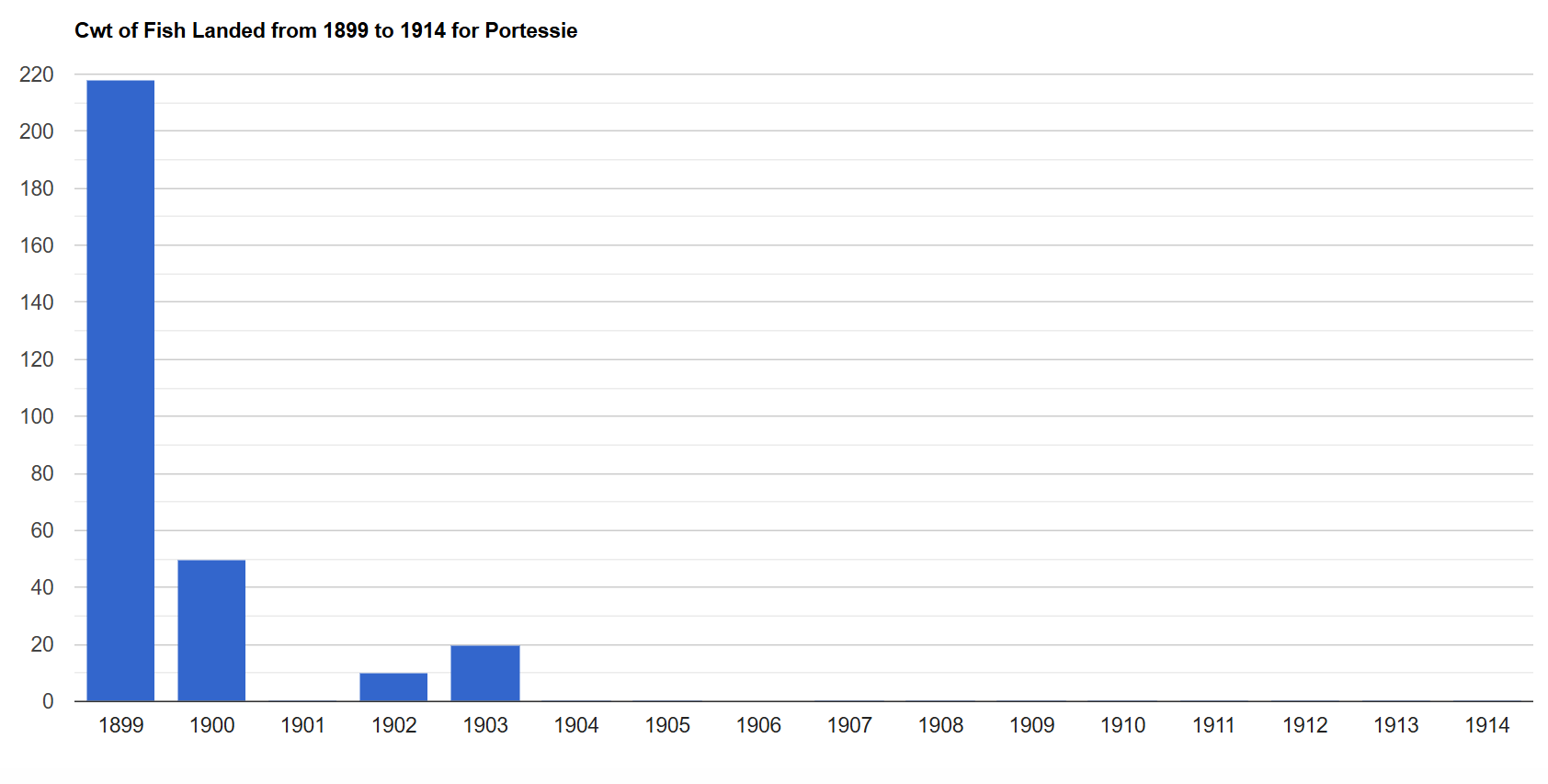
Cwt of fish landed (excluding shellfish)

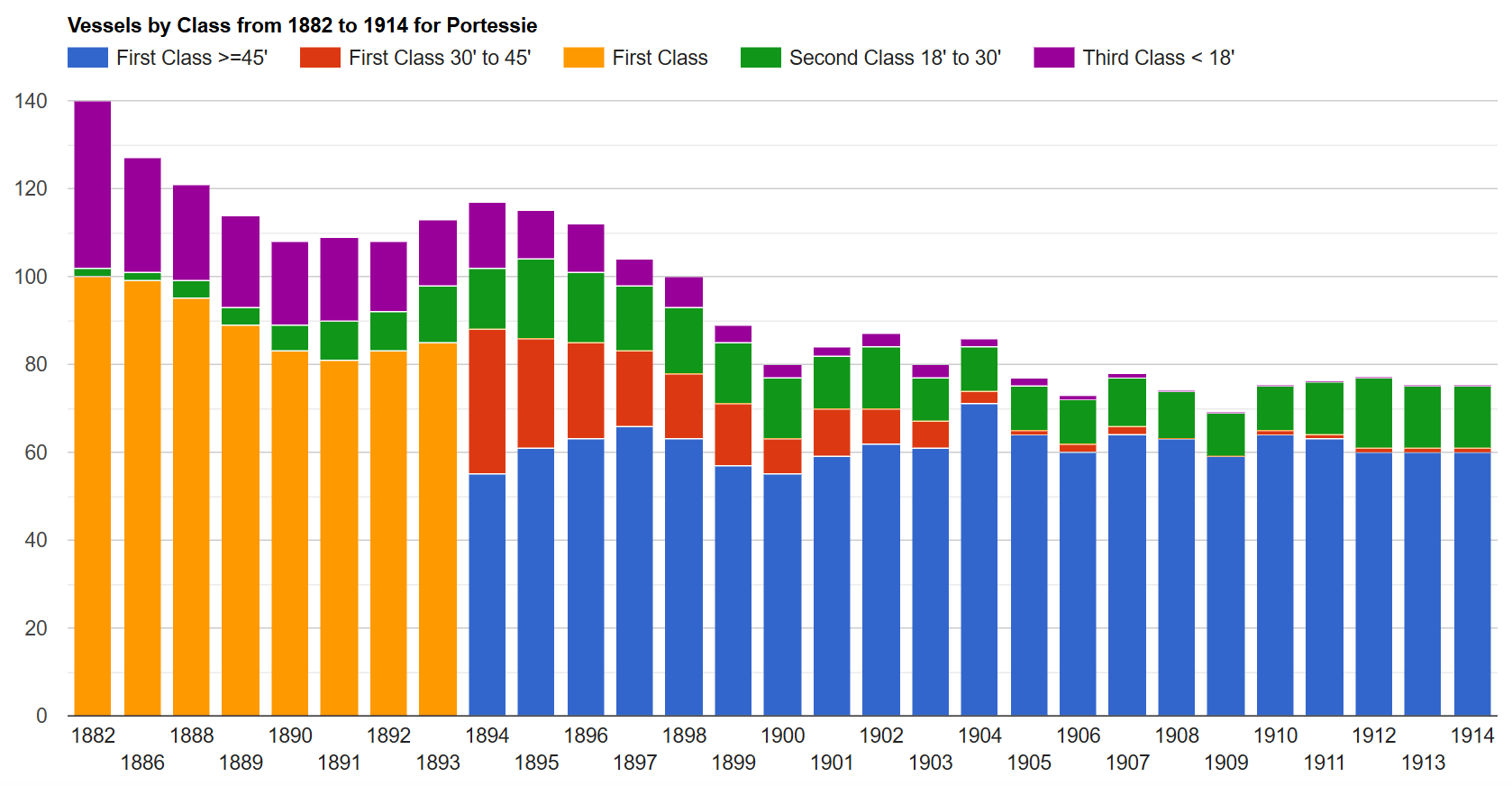
Vessels by class

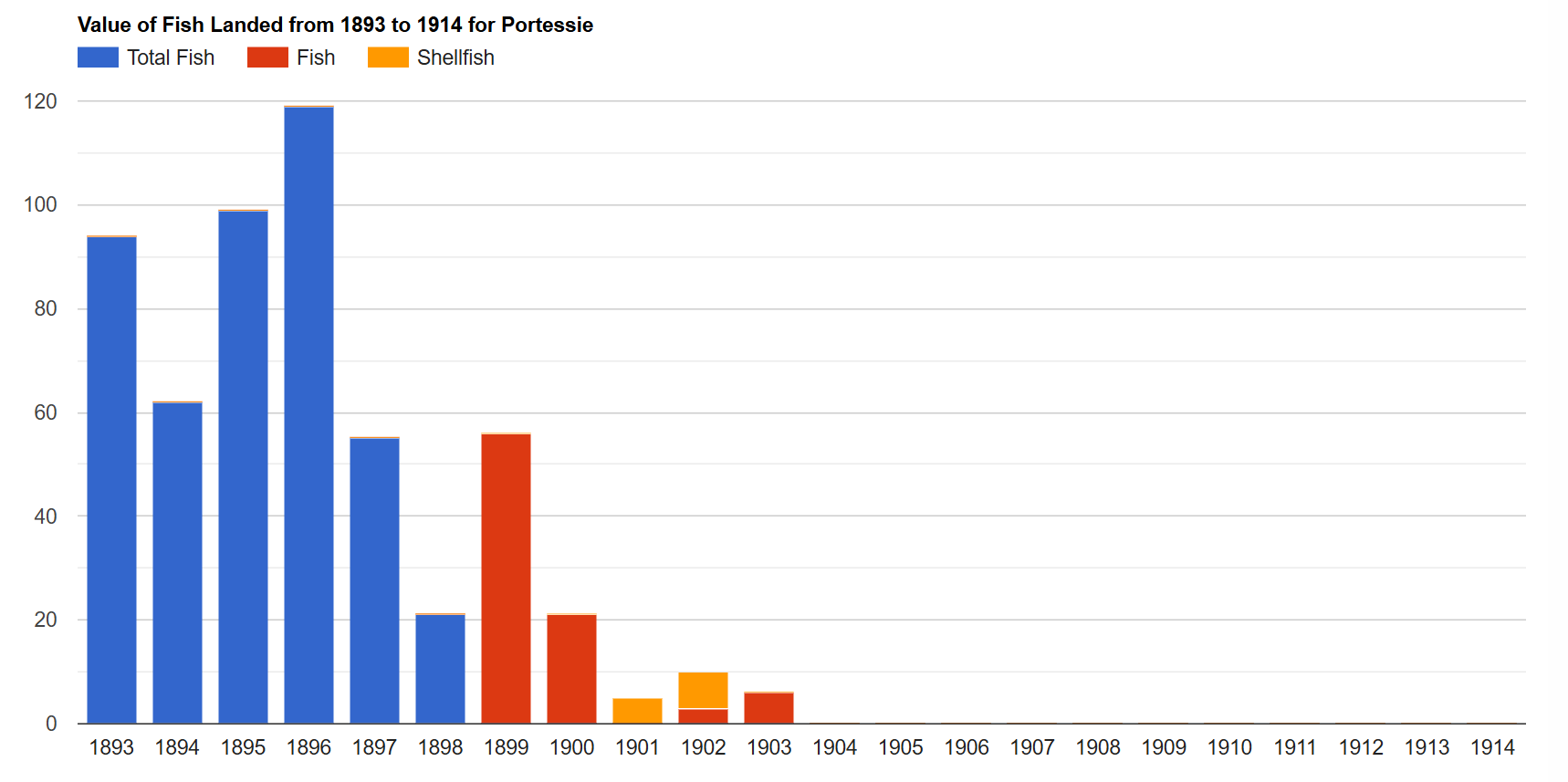
Value (£) of fish landed

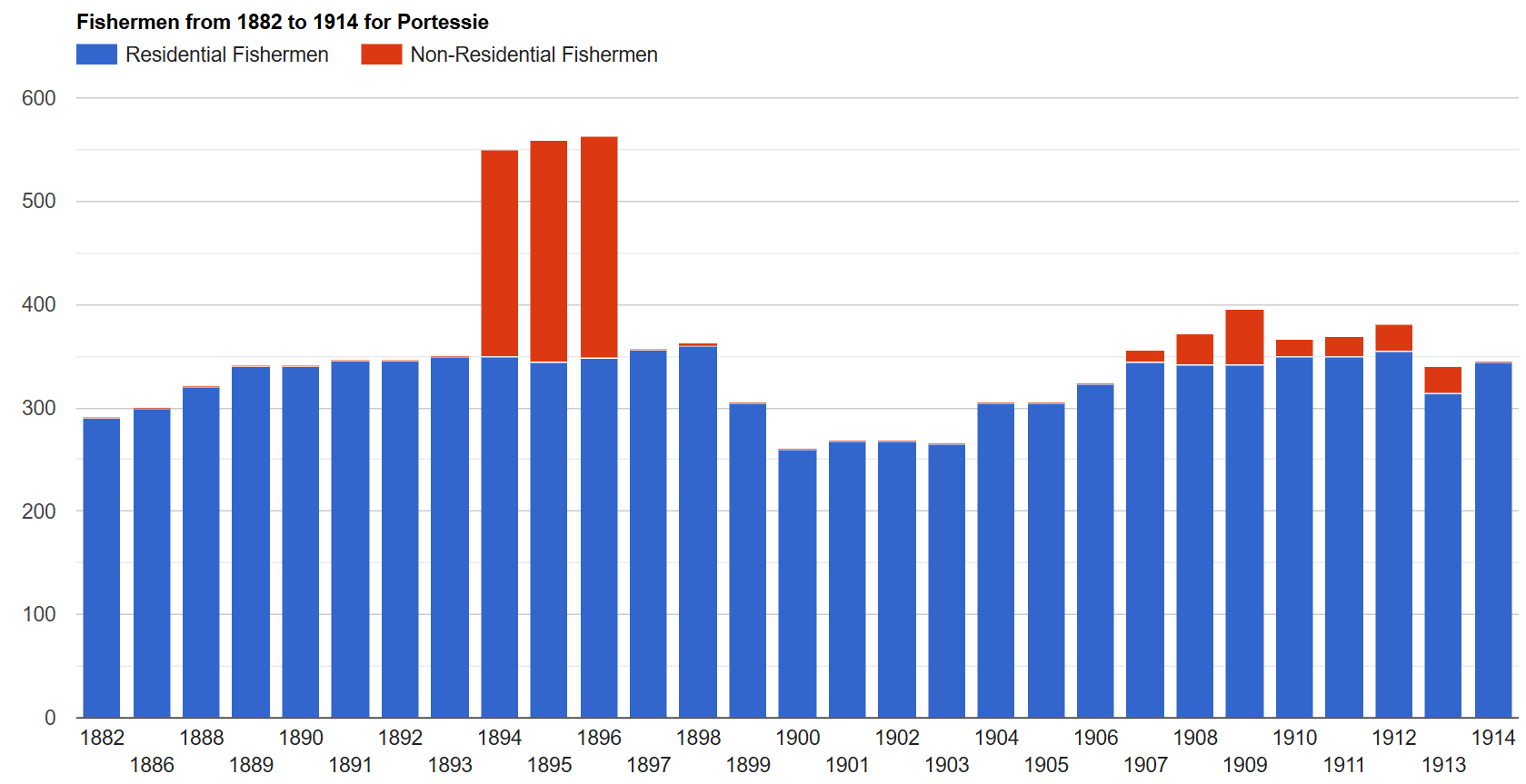
Fishermen

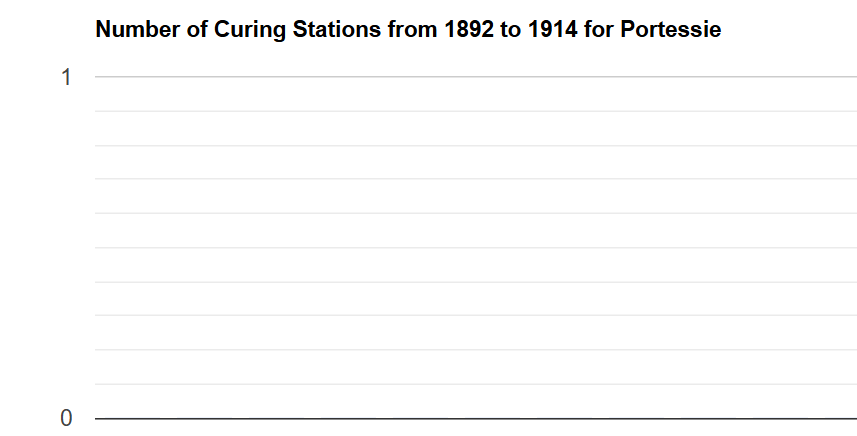
Placeholder - no curing stations

== See also ==
- Portessie railway station
