= List of Great North of Scotland Railway stations =

The communities that were served by the Great North of Scotland Railway

When, on 1 January 1923, the Great North of Scotland Railway (GNoSR) merged with other railways to become the London and North Eastern Railway, it owned 333 1/3 miles (536.4 km) of line. Its main line, from Aberdeen in Scotland to Elgin via Keith, served branches to Fraserburgh and Peterhead, Alford, Oldmeldrum, Macduff, Banff, Boat of Garten and Lossiemouth. The GNoSR operated two routes to Elgin, one via Moray Firth, known as the Coast line, and another via Keith and Craigelliache; these connected with the Highland Railway at Keith and Elgin for services to Inverness. Another line, used by the reigning monarch when they travelled to Balmoral Castle, connected Aberdeen with Ballater.

== Main line ==
The first section of Great North of Scotland's main line opened in 1854 from Kittybrewster to Huntly and was extended two years later to Keith. A through route to Inverness was formed in 1858 when was to become the Highland Railway reached the station and a junction was formed. Services ran to a terminus in Aberdeen at Waterloo from 1856 before Aberdeen joint station opened in 1867. The line was extended at the country end to Dufftown in 1862. Meanwhile, the Morayshire Railway had built a line from Rothes to Craigellachie, and subsequently linked this line to its Elgin station in 1862. This was connected to the GNoSR when the Strathspey Railway opened in 1863.

The GNoSR ran suburban services between Aberdeen and Dyce from 1887 and 1937. The old GNoSR main line west of Keith and the Coast line closed on 6 May 1968; on the same day services were withdrawn from minor intermediate stations. Currently the Aberdeen to Inverness Line uses the former Great North of Scotland Railway line as far Keith, with intermediate stations at Dyce, Inverurie, Insch, Huntly and Keith, before continuing over the former Highland Railway route to Inverness.

Station	Distance	Opened	Closed	Notes
Aberdeen	0 miles (0 km)	4 November 1867	—	
Schoolhill	3/8 mile (0.60 km)	1887	5 April 1937	
Hutcheon Street	7/8 mile (1.4 km)	1 July 1887	5 April 1937	
Waterloo	—	1 April 1856	4 November 1867	Original station in the city, 1 3/4 miles (2.8 km) from Kittybrewster.
Kittybrewster	1 3/8 miles (2.2 km)	20 September 1854	6 May 1968	Branch from Waterloo joins main line. Opened as Aberdeen Kittybrewster, moved and name changed to Kittybrewster in 1856, moved again in 1867.
Don Street	2 1/4 miles (3.6 km)	1 July 1887	5 April 1937	
Woodside	2 5/8 miles (4.2 km)	1858	5 April 1937	
Persley	3 1/4 miles (5.2 km)	1903	5 April 1937	Renamed Persley Halt in 1926
Bucksburn	4 1/8 miles (6.6 km)	20 September 1854	5 March 1957	Spelt Buxburn until 1897
Bankhead	4 5/8 miles (7.4 km)	1 July 1887	5 April 1937	
Stoneywood	5 1/8 miles (8.2 km)	1 July 1887	5 April 1937	
Dyce	6 1/4 miles (10.1 km)	20 September 1854	6 May 1968	Junction for the Buchan section from 1861, moved 200 metres (660 ft) when the branch opened. Reopened 15 September 1984 on site of first station.
Pitmedden	8 1/4 miles (13.3 km)	1874	7 December 1964	
Kinaldie	10 1/2 miles (16.9 km)	1 December 1854 (Note: Butt (1995, p. 133) lists opening date as November 1854.)	7 December 1964	
Kintore	13 1/4 miles (21.3 km)	20 September 1854	7 December 1964	Junction for the Alford branch
Inverurie	16 miles (26 km)	20 September 1854	—	Junction for the Oldmeldrum branch. Opened as Inverury, renamed in 1866, moved 805 metres (2,641 ft) south in 1902.
Inveramsay	20 1/2 miles (33.0 km)	5 September 1857	1 October 1951	Junction for the Macduff branch
Pitcaple	20 1/4 miles (32.6 km)	20 September 1854	6 May 1968	
Oyne	24 1/2 miles (39.4 km)	20 September 1854	6 May 1968	
Buchanstone	25 3/4 miles (41.4 km)	1 December 1854	September 1866	
Insch	27 1/2 miles (44.3 km)	20 September 1854	—	
Wardhouse	31 miles (50 km)	1 December 1854	5 June 1961	
Kennethmont	32 3/4 miles (52.7 km)	20 September 1854	6 May 1968	
Gartly	35 3/4 miles (57.5 km)	20 September 1854	6 May 1968	Sometimes described as Gartly for Lumsden and Strathdon.
Huntly	40 3/4 miles (65.6 km)	20 September 1854	—	
Rothiemay	45 1/4 miles (72.8 km)	10 October 1856	6 May 1968	
Cairnie Junction	48 1/4 miles (77.7 km)	May 1897	6 May 1968	Named Cairnie Platform before June 1919.
Grange	48 3/4 miles (78.5 km)	10 October 1856	6 May 1968	Interchange for Portsoy and Banff until the Coast line opened in 1886 with through services from Aberdeen.
Keith Junction	53 1/4 miles (85.7 km)	10 October 1856	—	Junction with the Highland Railway to Inverness from 18 August 1858.
Keith Town	54 miles (87 km)	21 February 1862	6 May 1968	Earlsmill until 1897
Auchindachy	56 3/4 miles (91.3 km)	21 February 1862	6 May 1968	Botriphnie until 1862
Drummuir	59 1/2 miles (95.8 km)	21 February 1862	6 May 1968	
Dufftown	64 miles (103 km)	21 February 1862	6 May 1968	
Craigellachie	68 miles (109 km)	1 July 1863	6 May 1968	Junction for the Strathspey branch. Opened as Strathspey Junction, renamed in 1864.
Dandaleith	68 3/4 miles (110.6 km)	23 December 1858	6 May 1968	Named Craigellachie until 1864.
Rothes	71 miles (114 km)	23 August 1858	6 May 1968	Served by a link to Orton until 31 July 1866
Birchfield	74 miles (119 km)	c. 1871	7 May 1956	
Coleburn	75 1/2 miles (121.5 km)	5 June 1863	After July 1926	Use restricted and renamed Coleburn April 1867
Longmorn	77 3/4 miles (125.1 km)	1 January 1862	6 May 1968	
Elgin	80 3/4 miles (130.0 km)	10 August 1852	—	Coast line and Lossiemouth branch, and a through line to the Highland Railway

== Buchan section ==
The Formartine and Buchan Railway built the 29 miles (47 km) from Dyce to Old Deer (renamed Mintlaw in 1867) via Maud, which opened on 18 July 1861, Maud becoming a junction when the 16-mile (26 km) line to Fraserburgh opened on 24 April 1865. The line was worked by the GNoSR from opening, who absorbed the original railway company on 1 August 1866. A branch from Ellon to Cruden Bay and Boddam opened in 1897. The line was closed to passengers on 4 October 1965 and completely 8 October 1979.

Station	Distance	Opened	Closed	Notes
Dyce	0 miles (0 km)	6 1/4 miles (10.1 km) from Aberdeen on the main line		
Parkhill	1 1/4 miles (2.0 km)	18 July 1861	3 April 1950	
Elrick SB	3 3/4 miles (6.0 km)			
Newmachar	5 1/4 miles (8.4 km)	18 July 1861	4 October 1965	Originally New Machar
Udny	8 1/4 miles (13.3 km)	18 July 1861	4 October 1965	
Logierieve	10 miles (16 km)	18 July 1861	4 October 1965	Briefly Newburgh Road on opening.
Esslemont	11 1/2 miles (18.5 km)	18 July 1861	15 September 1951	
Ellon	13 1/4 miles (21.3 km)	18 July 1861	4 October 1965	Junction with Cruden section. Known as Ellon for Cruden until 1897.
Arnage	16 3/4 miles (27.0 km)	18 July 1861	4 October 1965	
Auchnagatt	20 3/4 miles (33.4 km)	18 July 1861	4 October 1965	
Maud	25 miles (40 km)	18 July 1861	4 October 1965	Junction with Peterhead branch. Opened as Brucklay, renamed New Maud Junction on 24 April 1865, Maud Junction in April 1866, and Maud 21 September 1925.
Strichen	30 3/4 miles (49.5 km)	24 April 1865	4 October 1965	
Mormond	33 1/4 miles (53.5 km)	24 April 1865 (Note: Butt (1995, p. 163) has opening date in 1870.)	4 October 1965	
Lonmay	35 3/4 miles (57.5 km)	24 April 1865	4 October 1965	
Rathen	38 1/4 miles (61.6 km)	24 April 1865	4 October 1965	
Philorth	39 1/2 miles (63.6 km)	24 April 1865	4 October 1965	Private station, not in public timetable until 1926.
Fraserburgh	41 miles (66 km)	24 April 1865	4 October 1965	

== Cruden section ==
The GNoSR opened a branch from Ellon to Boddam on 2 August 1897 to serve a hotel and golf complex it was building at Cruden Bay. The line closed to passengers on 31 October 1932 and completely on 7 November 1945.

Station	Distance	Opened	Closed	Notes
Ellon	0 miles (0 km)	13 1/4 miles (21.3 km) from Dyce on the Buchan section		
Auchmacoy	3 1/2 miles (5.6 km)	2 August 1897	31 October 1932	
Pitlurg	5 1/2 miles (8.9 km)	2 August 1897	31 October 1932	
Hatton	8 1/4 miles (13.3 km)	2 August 1897	31 October 1932	
Cruden Bay	10 1/4 miles (16.5 km)	2 August 1897	31 October 1932	
Bullers O'Buchan	12 miles (19 km)	1900	31 October 1932	
Longhaven	13 1/2 miles (21.7 km)	2 August 1897	31 October 1932	
Boddam	15 1/2 miles (24.9 km)	2 August 1897	31 October 1932	

== Peterhead branch ==
The line from Dyce to Old Deer (renamed Mintlaw in 1867) was opened on 18 July 1861 by the Formartine and Buchan Railway, and extended the 9 miles (14 km) to Peterhead the following year. The railway was worked by the GNoSR from opening, who absorbed the Formartine and Buchan on 1 August 1866. The branch closed to passengers on 3 May 1965 and completely in 1970.

Station	Distance	Opened	Closed	Notes
Maud	0 miles (0 km)	25 miles (40 km) from Dyce on the Buchan section		
Mintlaw	4 miles (6.4 km)	18 July 1861	3 May 1965	Opened as Old Deer
Longside	7 1/4 miles (11.7 km)	3 July 1862	3 May 1965	
Newseat	9 1/2 miles (15.3 km)	3 July 1862	3 May 1965	Variously New Seat and Newseat Halt
Inverugie	11 miles (18 km)	3 July 1862	3 May 1965	
Peterhead	13 miles (21 km)	3 July 1862	3 May 1965	

== St Combs Light Railway ==
The GNoSR opened the St Combs Light Railway from Fraserburgh to St Combs on 1 July 1903, and it closed on 3 May 1965.

Station	Distance	Opened	Closed	Notes
Fraserburgh	0 miles (0 km)	Terminus of the Buchan section		
Kirkton Bridge	1 mile (1.6 km)	c. July 1904	3 May 1965	Opened as Kirton Bridge Halt, renamed June 1908
Philorth Bridge Halt	2 1/4 miles (3.6 km)	1 July 1903	3 May 1965	
Cairnbulg	3 5/8 miles (5.8 km)	1 July 1903	3 May 1965	Known as Inverallochy until 1 September 1903.
St Combs	5 1/8 miles (8.2 km)	1 July 1903	3 May 1965	

== Alford branch ==
The Alford Valley Railway from Kintore to Alford opened on 21 March 1859, worked by the GNoSR, with whom it merged on 1 August 1866. The line closed to passengers on 2 January 1950 and to goods in 1966.

Station	Distance	Opened	Closed	Notes
Kintore	0 miles (0 km)	On main line, 13 1/4 miles (21.3 km) from Aberdeen		
Paradise Sidings	3 3/4 miles (6.0 km)			Private
Kemnay	4 1/2 miles (7.2 km)	21 March 1859	2 January 1950	
Monymusk	7 1/2 miles (12.1 km)	21 March 1859	2 January 1950	
Tillyfourie	10 3/4 miles (17.3 km)	1860	2 January 1950	
Whitehouse	13 miles (21 km)	21 March 1859	2 January 1950	
Alford	16 miles (26 km)	21 March 1859	2 January 1950	

== Oldmeldrum branch ==
The Inverury and Old Meldrum Junction Railway from Inverurie to Old Meldrum opened on 26 June 1856, worked by the GNoSR, with whom it merged on 1 August 1866. The line closed to passengers on 2 November 1931 and to goods on 3 January 1966.

Station	Distance	Opened	Closed	Notes
Inverurie	0 miles (0 km)	On main line, 16 miles (26 km) from Aberdeen		
Lethenty	2 1/4 miles (3.6 km)	1 July 1856	2 November 1931	
Fingask Platform	3 1/2 miles (5.6 km)	1866	2 November 1931	In some timetable as Fingask.
Old Meldrum	5 1/4 miles (8.4 km)	1 July 1856	2 November 1931	Opened as Oldmeldrum, name changed about 1902.

== Macduff branch ==
Authorised in 1855 and sponsored by the Great North, the Banff, Macduff and Turriff Junction Railway opened a line from Inveramsay to Turriff in 1857, and another company, the Banff, Macduff and Turriff Extension built and opened an extension to Banff & Macduff nearly two years later. The railways were worked by the GNoSR from opening, and merged with it on 1 August 1866. The short extension to Macduff was opened by the GNoSR in 1872, the original terminal closed and demolished. The branch closed to passengers on 1 October 1951, the section north of Turriff completely on 1 August 1961 and completely on 3 January 1966.

Station	Distance	Opened	Closed	Notes
Inveramsay	0 miles (0 km)	On main line, 20 1/2 miles (33.0 km) from Aberdeen		
Wartle	3 3/4 miles (6.0 km)	5 September 1857 (Note: Butt (1995, p. 241) lists the opening date as 5 August 1857)	1 October 1951	
Rothie-Norman	7 1/2 miles (12.1 km)	5 September 1857	1 October 1951	Opened as Rothie, renamed Rothie-Norman 1 March 1870
Fyvie	10 3/4 miles (17.3 km)	5 September 1857	1 October 1951	
Auchterless	14 miles (23 km)	5 September 1857	1 October 1951	
Turriff	18 miles (29 km)	5 September 1857	1 October 1951	
Plaidy	22 1/2 miles (36.2 km)	4 June 1860	22 May 1944	
King Edward	24 3/4 miles (39.8 km)	4 June 1860	1 October 1951	
Banff & Macduff		4 June 1860	1 July 1872	
Banff Bridge	29 1/2 miles (47.5 km)	1 July 1872	1 October 1951	
Macduff	29 3/4 miles (47.9 km)	1 July 1872	1 October 1951	

== Coast line ==
The railway from Grange to Portsoy via Tillynaught was opened by the Banff, Portsoy and Strathisla Railway on 30 July 1859, with full services from 2 August following a derailment on the opening day. The GNoSR operated services from 1863; these ran from Grange to Banff with a connection at Tillynaught. This became an alternate route from Aberdeen to Elgin when the coast line had fully opened in 1886, a new curve allowing direct access from Aberdeen. Cairnie Platform (later Cairnie Junction) was built to allow trains to divide, with portions for Elgin via Craigellachie and the Coast Line. Direct access to Grange from the line was withdrawn after the curve closed on 7 March 1960 and the line closed completely on 6 May 1968.

Station	Distance	Opened	Closed	Notes
Cairnie Junction	0 miles (0 km)	On main line, 48 1/4 miles (77.7 km) from Aberdeen		
Knock (Note: Millegan railway station is listed in Vallance (1991, Appendix 4), 1 1/4 miles (2.0 km) from Cairne Junction, but not listed on Butt (1995, p. 160) or Jowett (1989, map 15))	3 1/4 miles (5.2 km)	30 July 1859	6 May 1968	
Glenbarry	4 1/2 miles (7.2 km)	30 July 1859	6 May 1968	Opened as Barry, closed in 1863. Reopened as Glenbarry in 1872.
Cornhill	7 3/4 miles (12.5 km)	30 July 1859	6 May 1968	
Tillynaught	10 miles (16 km)	30 July 1859	6 May 1968	
Portsoy	12 3/4 miles (20.5 km)	30 July 1859	6 May 1963	Station moved in 1884.
Glassaugh	14 3/4 miles (23.7 km)	1 April 1884	21 September 1953	
Tochieneal	17 miles (27 km)	1 April 1884	1 October 1951	
Cullen	18 1/4 miles (29.4 km)	1 May 1886	6 May 1968	
Portknockie	20 1/4 miles (32.6 km)	1 May 1886	6 May 1968	
Findochty	21 1/2 miles (34.6 km)	1 May 1886	6 May 1968	
Portessie	23 miles (37 km)	1 August 1884	6 May 1968	Also used by Highland Railway services from Keith before 1915.
Buckie	24 1/4 miles (39.0 km)	1 May 1886	6 May 1968	
Buckpool	25 1/4 miles (40.6 km)	1 May 1886	7 March 1960	Known as Nether Buckie before 1 January 1887.
Portgordon	26 3/4 miles (43.0 km)	1 May 1886	6 May 1968	Known as Port Gordon before 1938.
Spey Bay	29 miles (47 km)	1 May 1886	6 May 1968	Known as Fochabers and Spey Bay before 1 January 1918.
Garmouth	30 1/4 miles (48.7 km)	12 August 1884	6 May 1968	
Urquhart	33 1/2 miles (53.9 km)	12 August 1884	6 May 1968	
Calcots	36 miles (58 km)	12 August 1884	6 May 1968	
Lossie Junction SB	36 miles (58 km)	12 August 1884		Junction with the Lossiemouth branch
Elgin	39 miles (63 km)	10 August 1852	—	Main line via Craigellachie, Lossiemouth branch and a connection with the Highland Railway

== Banff branch ==
This was served from Grange until the Coast line opened in 1886, when services connected at Tillynaught. The branch closed to passengers on 6 July 1964 and completely on 6 May 1968.

Station	Distance	Opened	Closed	Notes
Tillynaught	0 miles (0 km)	On Coast Line 10 miles (16 km) from Cairnie Junction		
Ordens	1 1/4 miles (2.0 km)	30 July 1859	6 July 1964	Opened as Ordens. Service restricted after October 1863, renamed Ordens Platform by 1911 and service restored and renamed Ordens Halt on 14 July 1924
Ladysbridge	3 1/2 miles (5.6 km)	30 July 1859	6 July 1964	Opened as Lady's Bridge, renamed June 1886
Bridgefoot Halt	4 3/4 miles (7.6 km)	1914	6 July 1964	
Golf Club House	5 1/4 miles (8.4 km)	1914	6 July 1964	Also known as Banff Golf Club House
Banff	6 miles (9.7 km)	30 July 1859	6 July 1964	Known as Banff Harbour until June 1926.

== Speyside section ==
The Strathspey Railway opened on 1 July 1863 between Dufftown and Abernethy (later called Nethy Bridge), via Strathspey Junction (later called Craigellachie) where it joined an extension of the Morayshire Railway. The line from Dufftown north through Craigellachie became the main line, and the railway south to Nethy Bridge, (later extended to Boat of Garten) the branch line. The Strathspey was absorbed by the Great North of Scotland Railway in 1866. The line closed to passengers on 18 October 1965, the section south of Aberlour completely on 4 November 1968 and the remaining section completely 15 November 1971.

Station	Distance	Opened	Closed	Notes
Craigellachie	0 miles (0 km)	On main line, 68 miles (109 km) from Aberdeen		
Aberlour	2 1/4 miles (3.6 km)	1 July 1863	18 October 1965	
Dailuaine Halt (Note: Opened after the GNoSR had become part of the LNER.)	4 3/4 miles (7.6 km)	1934	18 October 1965	
Carron	5 1/2 miles (8.9 km)	1 July 1863	18 October 1965	
Imperial Cottages	6 miles (9.7 km)	15 June 1959	18 October 1965	
Knockando House	6 3/4 miles (10.9 km)	1 September 1869	18 October 1965	Private platform, known as Knockando until 1905.
Gilbey's Cottages	7 3/4 miles (12.5 km)	Summer 1959	18 October 1965	
Knockando	8 miles (13 km)	1899	18 October 1965	Known as Dalbeallie until 1905.
Blacksboat	10 1/4 miles (16.5 km)	1 July 1863	18 October 1965	
Ballindalloch	12 miles (19 km)	1 July 1863	18 October 1965	
Advie	15 1/4 miles (24.5 km)	1 July 1863	18 October 1965	Moved 1868.
Dalvey Farm	17 3/4 miles (28.6 km)	15 June 1959	18 October 1965	
Dalvey		1 July 1863	1 September 1868	Originally spelt Dalvie.
Cromdale	21 miles (34 km)	1 July 1863	18 October 1965	
Grantown-on-Spey	24 miles (39 km)	1 July 1863	18 October 1965	Opened as Grantown, renamed Grantown-on-Spey 1 June 1912 and Grantown-on-Spey East 5 June 1950
Ballifurth Farm	26 1/2 miles (42.6 km)	15 June 1959	18 October 1965	
Nethy Bridge	28 1/2 miles (45.9 km)	1 July 1863	18 October 1965	Opened as Abernethy, renamed in 1867.
Broomhill Junction	30 1/4 miles (48.7 km)			
Boat of Garten	33 1/4 miles (53.5 km)	3 August 1863	18 October 1965	The Strathspey Railway reached here on 1 August 1866. Joint station with Highland Railway.

== Lossiemouth branch ==
The Lossiemouth branch was built by the Morayshire Railway from its Elgin station on 10 August 1852. Worked by the GNoSR since 1863, the Morayshire Railway was absorbed by the GNoSR in August 1881. The line was closed to passengers on 6 April 1964 and completely two years later.

Station	Distance	Opened	Closed	Notes
Lossie Junction; Signal Box	0 miles (0 km)	On Coast Line 1 mile (1.6 km) from Elgin		
Linksfield	1/2 mile (0.80 km)	10 August 1852	1859	Request stop, did not appear in timetables after 1859.
Greens of Draine	2 1/2 miles (4.0 km)	10 August 1852	1859	Request stop, did not appear in timetables after 1859.
Lossiemouth	4 1/2 miles (7.2 km)	10 August 1852	6 April 1964	

== Deeside section ==
The Deeside Railway opened from Ferryhill to Banchory on 8 September 1853 and services were extended to Guild Street when this opened the following year. A new company, the Aboyne Extension opened the line to Aboyne in 1859, and the Aboyne & Braemar Railway extended the line to Ballater in 1866. The Aberdeen joint station became the terminus when this opened in 1867. The Deeside Railway was leased by the GNoSR from 1866 who absorbed the Deeside Railway on 1 August 1875 and the Aboyne & Braemar Railway on 31 January 1876. The line closed to passengers on 28 February 1966, the section west of Culter completely on 18 July 1966 and the remaining section completely 2 January 1967.

Station	Distance	Opened	Closed	Notes
Aberdeen (Joint)	0 miles (0 km)	4 November 1867	—	
Ferryhill Junction signal box	5/8 mile (1.0 km)			
Holburn Street	1 3/8 miles (2.2 km)	2 July 1894	5 April 1937	
Ruthrieston	1 3/4 miles (2.8 km)	January 1856	5 April 1937	Closed 1876–1885
Pitfodels	3 miles (4.8 km)	2 July 1894	5 April 1937	
Cults	3 5/8 miles (5.8 km)	8 September 1853	28 February 1966	Station moved 1855.
West Cults	4 1/8 miles (6.6 km)	1 August 1894	5 April 1937	
Bieldside	4 3/4 miles (7.6 km)	1 June 1897	5 April 1937	
Murtle	5 3/8 miles (8.7 km)	8 September 1853	5 April 1937	
Milltimber	6 1/4 miles (10.1 km)	1854	5 April 1937	
Culter	7 3/8 miles (11.9 km)	8 September 1853	28 February 1966	
Drum	9 3/4 miles (15.7 km)	January 1854	10 September 1951	
Park	10 3/4 miles (17.3 km)	8 September 1853	28 February 1966	
Mills of Drum	13 miles (21 km)	8 September 1853	1 January 1863	
Crathes	14 1/4 miles (22.9 km)	8 September 1853	28 February 1966	Private platform, replaced Mills of Drum as public station from 1863
Banchory	16 3/4 miles (27.0 km)	8 September 1853	28 February 1966	Station moved in 1859 and 1902
Dee Street Halt	17 1/2 miles (28.2 km)	6 February 1961	28 February 1966	
Glassel	21 3/8 miles (34.4 km)	2 December 1859	28 February 1966	
Torphins	23 3/4 miles (38.2 km)	2 December 1859	28 February 1966	
Lumphanan	26 7/8 miles (43.3 km)	2 December 1859	28 February 1966	
Dess	29 1/2 miles (47.5 km)	2 December 1859	28 February 1966	
Aboyne	32 1/4 miles (51.9 km)	2 December 1859	28 February 1966	
Dinnet	36 3/4 miles (59.1 km)	17 October 1866	28 February 1966	
Cambus O'May	39 3/8 miles (63.4 km)	1876	28 February 1966	
Ballater	43 1/4 miles (69.6 km)	17 October 1866	28 February 1966	

== Notes and references ==
=== Books ===
- Butt, R. V. J. (October 1995). The Directory of Railway Stations: details every public and private passenger station, halt, platform and stopping place, past and present (1st ed.). Sparkford: Patrick Stephens Ltd. ISBN 978-1-85260-508-7. OCLC 60251199. OL 11956311M.
- Jowett, Alan (March 1989). Jowett's Railway Atlas of Great Britain and Ireland: From Pre-Grouping to the Present Day (1st ed.). Patrick Stephens Ltd. ISBN 1-8526-0086-1.
- Vallance, H. A. (27 June 1991). Great North of Scotland railway. The History of the Railways of the Scottish Highlands vol 3. David St John Thomas. ISBN 978-0-946537-60-0.
