= Knock railway station (Scotland) =

Former railway station in Scotland

Knock (Banffshire)

General information
- Location: Banff, Aberdeenshire, Aberdeenshire; Scotland
- Coordinates: 57.563759°N 2.760216°W
- Grid reference: NJ 553 545
- Platforms: 1 (2)

Other information
- Status: Disused

History
- Original company: Banff, Portsoy and Strathisla Railway
- Pre-grouping: Great North of Scotland Railway
- Post-grouping: London and North Eastern Railway

Key dates
- 30 July 1859: Opened
- 6 May 1968: Closed to passengers
Location

Knock railway station was an intermediate stop situated on the Great North of Scotland Railway (GNoSR) line from Grange and Cairnie Junction to Tillynaught. Knock served the rural community and later the Knockdhu Distillery in Banffshire. The line northwards ran to Tillynaught where it split to reach Banff by a branch line or Elgin by the Moray Coast line.

Knock was opened in 1859 by the Banff, Portsoy and Strathisla Railway, and in 1867 was absorbed by the GNoSR who took over the line and then operating it until grouping in 1923. Passing into British Railways ownership in 1948, the line was, like the rest of the ex-GNoSR lines along the Moray coast, considered for closure as part of the Beeching report and closure notices were issued in 1963.

== Station infrastructure ==
In 1894 the station had three sidings, a passing loop and two platforms with a signal box on the 'up' platform, singled by 1968. The OS map of 1867 shows a basic station with a shelter, a single platform and only one siding on the opposite side of the road over bridge from the 1902 station that served the distillery in addition to the needs of the rural community. In 1902 the Knockdhu Distillery is shown with sidings, goods shed, signal box and two platforms with a footbridge.

In 2011 the platform remained near the Knockdhu distillery together with the old Loading docks however the road over bridge had been demolished.

Preceding station	Historical railways	Following station
Millegin; Towards Grange	Great North of Scotland; Banff branch 1884–1886	Glenbarry; Towards Banff

== See also ==
- List of Great North of Scotland Railway stations
