= Millegin railway station =

Former railway station in Scotland

Millegin Millagan
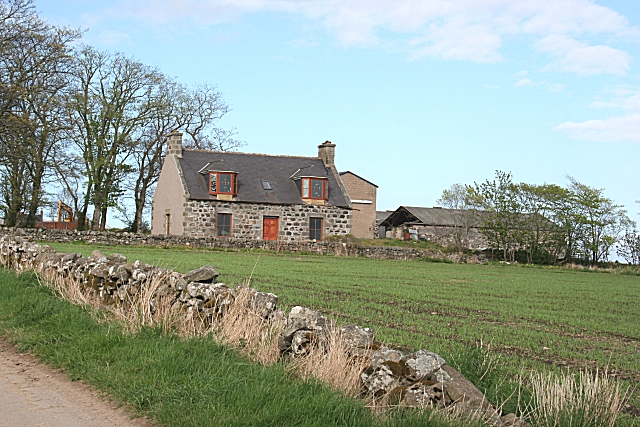
- Millegin near Bridge of Millegin

General information
- Location: Banff, Aberdeenshire, Aberdeenshire; Scotland
- Coordinates: 57.545593°N 2.809213°W
- Grid reference: NJ 516 508
- Platforms: 1

Other information
- Status: Disused

History
- Original company: Banff, Portsoy and Strathisla Railway
- Pre-grouping: Great North of Scotland Railway

Key dates
- 30 July 1859: Opened
- October 1860: Closed to passengers
Location

Millegin railway station, Millagan railway station or later Millegin Siding was briefly an intermediate stop situated on what became the Great North of Scotland Railway (GNoSR) line from Grange and Cairnie Junction to Tillynaught. Millegin served the rural community and the nearby saw mill in Banffshire. The line northwards ran to Tillynaught where it split to reach Banff by a branch line or Elgin by the Moray Coast line.

Millegin was opened in 1859 by the Banff, Portsoy and Strathisla Railway, and closed to passengers in October 1860, remaining as a freight siding that was however lifted by 1902. The line passed into British Railways ownership in 1948 and was, like the rest of the ex-GNoSR lines along the Moray coast, considered for closure as part of the Beeching report, closure notices were issued in 1963.

== Station infrastructure ==
In 1867 the OS map shows that the station had closed and only a siding was present with a loading dock, by 1902 the siding had been lifted.

No physical remains of the station or siding are visible on site.

Preceding station	Historical railways	Following station
Grange; Towards Grange	Great North of Scotland; Banff branch	Knock; Towards Banff

== See also ==
- List of Great North of Scotland Railway stations
