= Glenbarry railway station =

Railway station in Aberdeenshire, Scotland

Glenbarry Barry
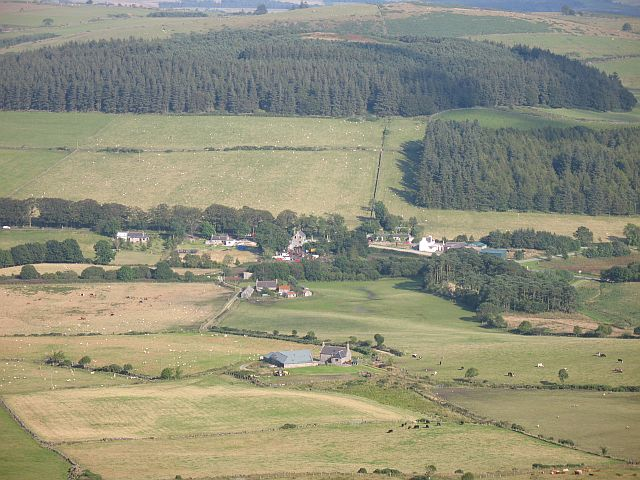
- Glenbarry

General information
- Location: Banff, Aberdeenshire, Aberdeenshire; Scotland
- Coordinates: 57.580412°N 2.746515°W
- Grid reference: NJ 553 545
- Platforms: 2

Other information
- Status: Disused

History
- Original company: Banff, Portsoy and Strathisla Railway
- Pre-grouping: Great North of Scotland Railway
- Post-grouping: London and North Eastern Railway

Key dates
- 30 July 1859: Opened
- October 1863: Closed
- 19 February 1872: Reopened as Glenbarry
- 6 May 1968: Closed to passengers
Location

Glenbarry railway station, previously known as Barry was an intermediate stop with a passing loop situated on the Great North of Scotland Railway (GNSR) line from Cairnie Junction to Tillynaught. There were two platforms at Glenbarry that served the nearby hamlet that lies in what was once Banffshire. The line northwards ran to Tillynaught where it split to reach Banff by a branch line or Elgin by the Moray Coast line.

Barry was opened in 1859 by the Banff, Portsoy and Strathisla Railway, and in 1867 was absorbed by the GNSR who took over the line, closed 'Barry' in 1863, reopening it as 'Glenbarry' in 1872 and then operating it until grouping in 1923. Passing into British Railways ownership in 1948, the line was, like the rest of the ex-GNSR lines along the Moray coast, considered for closure as part of the Beeching report and closure notices were issued in 1963. Passenger services were withdrawn in May 1968 whilst freight had ceased on 2 November 1964.

== Station infrastructure ==
In 1902 the OS map shows the presence of a water tower, weighing machine, two sidings in a goods yard with a goods shed, two platforms with a footbridge, ticket office, shelters and a signal box. A road over bridge is located nearby. The signal box was operational until 25 June 1966.

The base of the old water tower survived in 1988.

== See also ==
- List of Great North of Scotland Railway stations

Preceding station	Historical railways	Following station
Knock; Towards Grange	Great North of Scotland; Banff branch 1884–1886	Cornhill; Towards Banff
