= Lady's Bridge (disambiguation) =

Lady's Bridge or similar terms may refer to:

- Lady's Bridge, a bridge in Sheffield, England
- Lady's Bridge (album) (2007), by Richard Hawley
- Ladysbridge, County Cork, Ireland, a village
- Ladysbridge railway station, near Banff, Aberdeenshire, Scotland
- Ladysbridge Hospital, near Banff, Aberdeenshire, Scotland, a mental health facility
- Ladybridge High School, Bolton, England
- Waterloo Bridge, a bridge in London, England

== See also ==
- Women's Bridge (disambiguation)
