= Ordens railway station =

Former railway station in Scotland

Ordens Ordens Halt
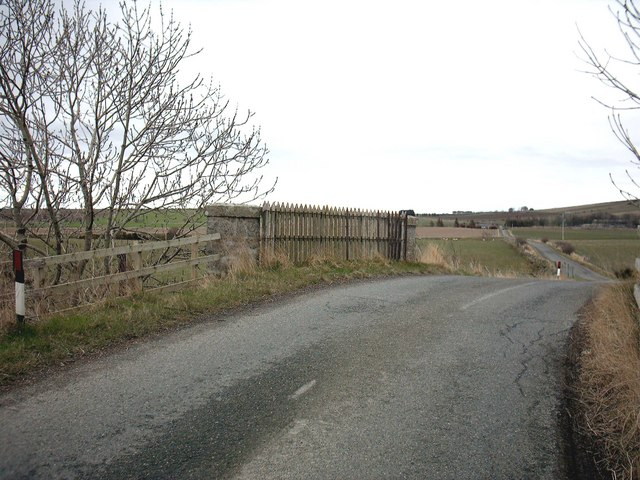
- The bridge near the site of the station in 2006

General information
- Location: Banff, Aberdeenshire, Aberdeenshire; Scotland
- Coordinates: 57.647787°N 2.634485°W
- Grid reference: NJ 362 862
- Platforms: 1

Other information
- Status: Disused

History
- Original company: Banff, Portsoy and Strathisla Railway
- Pre-grouping: Great North of Scotland Railway
- Post-grouping: London and North Eastern Railway

Key dates
- 30 July 1859: Opened as Ordens
- October 1863: Service restricted
- 1911: Reopened as Ordens Platform
- 14 July 1924: Renamed Ordens Halt and service restored
- 6 July 1964: Closed to all traffic
Location

Ordens railway station was opened in 1859, its services restricted and renamed Ordens Platform railway station by 1911 and finally Ordens Halt railway station in 1924 with a restored service. The station was close to a farm of that name and served a very rural locality. The line from Tillynaught opened in 1859 and a temporary terminus opened on 30 July 1859 and a permanent station opened in 1860. There was a single platform.

The Great North of Scotland Railway (GNoS) took over the line in 1867 and operated it until grouping in 1923. Passing into British Railways ownership in 1948, the line was, like the rest of the former GNoS lines along the Moray coast, considered for closure as part of the Beeching report and closure notices were issued in 1963. Passenger services were withdrawn in 1964 and the entire line, including Banff station finally closed in 1968.

== Station infrastructure ==
The station sat next to a road overbridge and in 1866 had a shelter and a siding with a loading dock. By 1902 the siding had been lifted and the loading dock abandoned, together with its entrance off the road, the station now being known as 'Ordens Platform', with a smaller shelter and no signalling indicated. In 2011 the station hut and platform remained and the hut still had part of the name "Ordens" painted at the back.

== Services ==
Opened as conditional halt in 1859 Ordens ceased to appear in the timetables by 1864. The station reappeared in Bradshaw's Guide between January 1917 and October 1920, but it may have remained as a conditional and unadvertised stop before this time. Ordens appeared in the LNER timetables from 14/7/24 and services continued until closure.

Preceding station	Historical railways	Following station
Tillynaught; Towards Grange	Great North of Scotland; Banff branch	Ladysbridge; Towards Banff

== See also ==
- List of Great North of Scotland Railway stations
