= List of listed buildings in Boyndie =

This is a list of listed buildings in the parish of Boyndie in Aberdeenshire, Scotland.

== List ==
Name	Location	Date Listed	Grid Ref. (Note: Sometimes known as OSGB36, the grid reference (where provided) is based on the British national grid reference system used by the Ordnance Survey. • "Guide to National Grid". Ordnance Survey. • "Get-a-map". Ordnance Survey.)	Geo-coordinates	Notes	LB Number (Note: Historic Environment Scotland assign a unique alphanumeric identifier to each designated site in Scotland, for listed buildings this always begins with "LB", for example "LB12345".)	Image
Whitehills, 7 Knock Street				57°40′42″N 2°34′45″W	Category C(S)	3229	Upload Photo
Inverboyndie Bridge Over The Burn Of Boyndie				57°40′06″N 2°33′28″W	Category B	3236	Upload Photo
Inverboyndie St Brandon's Church (Old Parish Church Of Scotland) And Burial Ground				57°40′10″N 2°33′38″W	Category B	3237	Upload Photo
Whitehills, 12 West End				57°40′39″N 2°35′07″W	Category C(S)	3167	Upload Photo
Whitehills, 15 Knock Street				57°40′42″N 2°34′40″W	Category C(S)	3194	Upload Photo
Whitehills, 6 Knock Street				57°40′41″N 2°34′44″W	Category C(S)	3197	Upload Photo
Whitehills, 22 Knock Street				57°40′42″N 2°34′37″W	Category C(S)	3203	Upload Photo
Whitehills, 1 Low Shore				57°40′38″N 2°35′05″W	Category C(S)	3206	Upload Photo
Whitehills, 4 Low Shore				57°40′38″N 2°35′03″W	Category B	3209	Upload Photo
Whitehills, 8 Low Shore				57°40′38″N 2°35′01″W	Category C(S)	3213	Upload Photo
Whitehills, 8 Boyne Street				57°40′38″N 2°35′04″W	Category C(S)	3222	Upload Photo
Whitehills, Chapel Street, Methodist Chapel, Enclosing Walls And Gatepiers				57°40′38″N 2°34′52″W	Category B	3223	Upload Photo
Whitehills, 13 Knock Street, Corein Cott				57°40′42″N 2°34′41″W	Category C(S)	3232	Upload Photo
Mill Of Boyndie Farmhouse				57°39′56″N 2°33′48″W	Category B	3242	Upload Photo
Whitehills, Seafield Street, Trinity Church (Church Of Scotland)				57°40′32″N 2°34′48″W	Category B	3165	Upload another image See more images
Whitehills, 14 West End, Honey Cottage				57°40′38″N 2°35′06″W	Category C(S)	3169	Upload Photo
Whitehills, 11 Low Shore				57°40′38″N 2°34′59″W	Category C(S)	3175	Upload Photo
Whitehills, 13, 14 Low Shore, Cuil-Na-Mara				57°40′39″N 2°34′59″W	Category C(S)	3176	Upload Photo
Whitehills, 25 Low Shore				57°40′39″N 2°34′56″W	Category B	3185	Upload Photo
Whitehills, 32 Low Shore				57°40′39″N 2°34′54″W	Category C(S)	3192	Upload Photo
Whitehills, 33 Low Shore				57°40′39″N 2°34′54″W	Category C(S)	3193	Upload Photo
Whitehills, 8 Knock Street				57°40′41″N 2°34′43″W	Category C(S)	3198	Upload Photo
Whitehills, 18 Knock Street				57°40′42″N 2°34′39″W	Category C(S)	3202	Upload Photo
Whitehills, 3 Low Shore				57°40′38″N 2°35′04″W	Category C(S)	3208	Upload Photo
Boyndie Airfield, Operations Block				57°39′31″N 2°37′56″W	Category B	49836	Upload Photo
Whitehills, 6 Boyne Street				57°40′38″N 2°35′05″W	Category C(S)	3221	Upload Photo
Lintmill Bridge Over The Burn Of Boyne				57°40′21″N 2°39′37″W	Category C(S)	3240	Upload Photo
Mains Of Baldavie House				57°38′21″N 2°38′11″W	Category B	3241	Upload Photo
Whitehills, 15 Low Shore				57°40′39″N 2°34′59″W	Category C(S)	3177	Upload Photo
Whitehills, 26 Low Shore				57°40′39″N 2°34′55″W	Category C(S)	3186	Upload Photo
Whitehills 10 And 10A Knock Street, Knock House And Garden Walls				57°40′41″N 2°34′42″W	Category B	3199	Upload Photo
Whitehills, Low Shore/ Seafield Street, Seafield Estate Girnal/Warehouse				57°40′43″N 2°34′47″W	Category B	3205	Upload Photo
Whitehills, 3 Boyne Street				57°40′37″N 2°35′06″W	Category C(S)	3216	Upload Photo
Whitehills, 4 Boyne Street				57°40′37″N 2°35′06″W	Category C(S)	3217	Upload Photo
Whitehills, Chapel Street, Seafield Arms Hotel, Garden Walls And Gatepiers				57°40′37″N 2°34′51″W	Category B	3224	Upload Photo
Whitehills, 34 Low Shore				57°40′40″N 2°34′55″W	Category C(S)	3163	Upload Photo
Whitehills, 22 Seafield Street, Greystones And Garden Walls				57°40′38″N 2°34′48″W	Category B	3166	Upload Photo
Whitehills, 19 Low Shore				57°40′39″N 2°34′58″W	Category C(S)	3181	Upload Photo
Whitehills, 17 Knock Street				57°40′43″N 2°34′39″W	Category C(S)	3195	Upload Photo
Whitehills, 16 Knock Street				57°40′42″N 2°34′39″W	Category C(S)	3201	Upload Photo
Whitehills, 10 Boyne Street				57°40′37″N 2°35′03″W	Category C(S)	3219	Upload Photo
Whitehills, 1 Knock Street				57°40′41″N 2°34′47″W	Category B	3226	Upload Photo
Whitehills, 3 Knock Street				57°40′42″N 2°34′46″W	Category C(S)	3227	Upload Photo
Whitehills, 23 Ogilvie Street				57°40′39″N 2°34′54″W	Category C(S)	3164	Upload Photo
Whitehills, 9 Low Shore				57°40′38″N 2°35′00″W	Category B	3173	Upload Photo
Whitehills, 10 Low Shore, Drumfergue				57°40′38″N 2°35′00″W	Category C(S)	3174	Upload Photo
Whitehills, 18 Low Shore				57°40′38″N 2°34′57″W	Category C(S)	3180	Upload Photo
Whitehills, 24 Low Shore				57°40′39″N 2°34′56″W	Category C(S)	3184	Upload Photo
Whitehills, 31 Low Shore				57°40′39″N 2°34′55″W	Category C(S)	3191	Upload Photo
Whitehills, 19 Knock Street				57°40′43″N 2°34′38″W	Category B	3196	Upload Photo
Whitehills, 24 Knock Street				57°40′42″N 2°34′36″W	Category C(S)	3204	Upload Photo
Whitehills, 2 Low Shore				57°40′38″N 2°35′04″W	Category C(S)	3207	Upload Photo
Whitehills, 5 Low Shore And Store				57°40′38″N 2°34′59″W	Category C(S)	3210	Upload Photo
Scotsmill Mill And Former Steading				57°40′37″N 2°39′18″W	Category B	3215	Upload Photo
Whitehills, 11 Boyne Street				57°40′37″N 2°35′03″W	Category C(S)	3220	Upload Photo
Whitehills, Harbour Place, Lifeboat House And Slipway				57°40′47″N 2°34′43″W	Category B	3225	Upload another image See more images
Whitehills, 9 And 9A Knock Street				57°40′42″N 2°34′44″W	Category C(S)	3230	Upload Photo
Whitehills, 11 Knock Street, Elaness				57°40′42″N 2°34′43″W	Category C(S)	3231	Upload Photo
Boyndie Parish Church (Church Of Scotland), Former Beadle's Cottage And Steading				57°39′46″N 2°36′06″W	Category B	3234	Upload Photo
Ladysbridge Hospital, Troup, Administration And Moor Newton Blocks				57°39′46″N 2°35′19″W	Category B	3238	Upload another image
Whitehills, 13 West End				57°40′38″N 2°35′07″W	Category C(S)	3168	Upload Photo
Whitehills, 17 West End				57°40′38″N 2°35′07″W	Category C(S)	3171	Upload Photo
Whitehills, 16 Low Shore				57°40′38″N 2°34′58″W	Category C(S)	3178	Upload Photo
Whitehills, 21 Low Shore				57°40′39″N 2°34′58″W	Category B	3182	Upload Photo
Whitehills, 28 Low Shore				57°40′40″N 2°34′55″W	Category C(S)	3188	Upload Photo
Whitehills, 6 Low Shore				57°40′38″N 2°35′02″W	Category C(S)	3211	Upload Photo
Scotsmill Bridge Over The Burn Of Boyne				57°40′37″N 2°39′19″W	Category B	3214	Upload Photo
Whitehills, 7 Boyne Street				57°40′37″N 2°35′04″W	Category C(S)	3218	Upload Photo
Whitehills, 5 Knock Street				57°40′42″N 2°34′45″W	Category C(S)	3228	Upload Photo
Boyndie Church Of Scotland Manse				57°39′48″N 2°36′02″W	Category B	3235	Upload Photo
Lintmill Of Boyne, Old Lintmill And Garden Wall At South				57°40′11″N 2°39′34″W	Category C(S)	3239	Upload Photo
Whitehills, 27 Low Shore				57°40′39″N 2°34′56″W	Category C(S)	3187	Upload Photo
Whitehills, 29 Low Shore				57°40′40″N 2°34′55″W	Category C(S)	3189	Upload Photo
Whitehills, 24A Low Shore				57°40′39″N 2°34′56″W	Category C(S)	40	Upload Photo
Whitehills, 7 Low Shore				57°40′38″N 2°35′02″W	Category C(S)	3212	Upload Photo
'Art Caput', Boyndie				57°39′48″N 2°36′09″W	Category B	3233	Upload Photo
Whitehills, 15 West End				57°40′38″N 2°35′07″W	Category C(S)	3170	Upload Photo
Whitehills, 18 West End				57°40′38″N 2°35′06″W	Category C(S)	3172	Upload Photo
Whitehills, 17 Low Shore Stormcrest				57°40′39″N 2°34′58″W	Category B	3179	Upload Photo
Whitehills, 22 Low Shore				57°40′38″N 2°34′56″W	Category C(S)	3183	Upload Photo
Whitehills, 30 Low Shore				57°40′40″N 2°34′55″W	Category C(S)	3190	Upload Photo
Whitehills, 14 Knock Street				57°40′42″N 2°34′40″W	Category C(S)	3200	Upload Photo
Boyndie Airfield, Control Tower				57°39′59″N 2°38′01″W	Category B	49835	Upload Photo

== Key ==
The scheme for classifying buildings in Scotland is:

- Category A: "buildings of national or international importance, either architectural or historic; or fine, little-altered examples of some particular period, style or building type."
- Category B: "buildings of regional or more than local importance; or major examples of some particular period, style or building type, which may have been altered."
- Category C: "buildings of local importance; lesser examples of any period, style, or building type, as originally constructed or moderately altered; and simple traditional buildings which group well with other listed buildings."

In March 2016 there were 47,288 listed buildings in Scotland. Of these, 8% were Category A, and 50% were Category B, with the remaining 42% being Category C.

== See also ==
- List of listed buildings in Aberdeenshire
