= Golf Club House Halt railway station =

Former railway station in Scotland

Golf Club House Halt Banff Golf Club House Halt
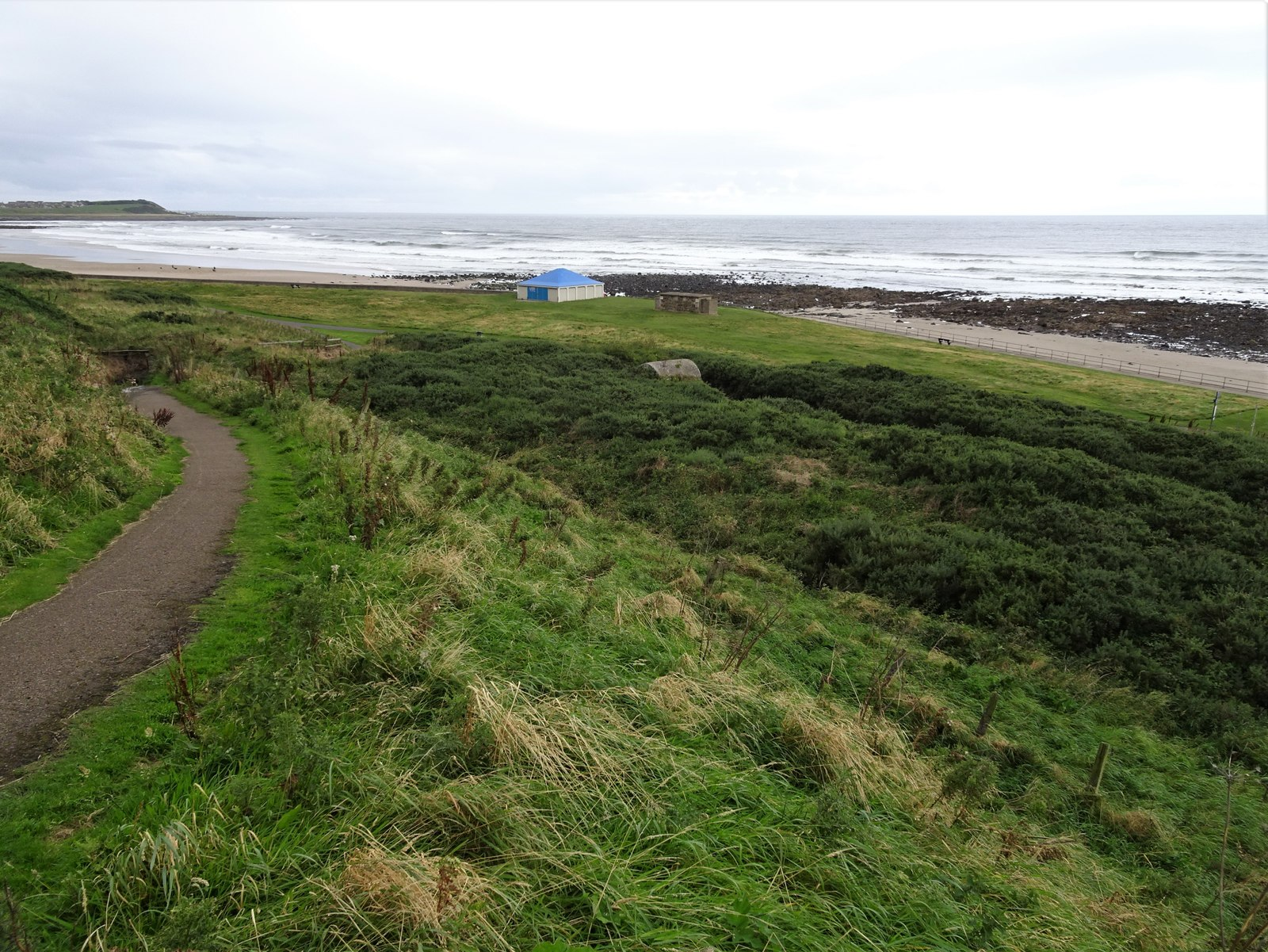
- The site of the station in 2019

General information
- Location: Banff, Aberdeenshire, Aberdeenshire; Scotland
- Coordinates: 57.669103°N 2.539777°W
- Grid reference: NJ 678 645
- Platforms: 1

Other information
- Status: Disused

History
- Pre-grouping: Great North of Scotland Railway
- Post-grouping: London and North Eastern Railway

Key dates
- 1902: 'Links Halt' present
- 1914: Platform Opened
- 6 July 1964: Closed to passengers
- 1968: Line closed to all traffic
Location

Golf Club House Halt railway station, also known as Banff Golf House Halt railway station was opened in 1914. The halt was located close to the town of Banff's golf club on the links. The line from Tillynaught opened in 1859 and a temporary terminus opened at Banff on 30 July 1859 and a permanent station opened in 1860. There was a single platform at the Golf Club House Halt, located on the shore side of the line and no provision for goods traffic. The OS map of 1902 shows a 'Halt' at the site of the 1914 platform without indicating any structure at the site.

Banff Links was the terminus of the line until 1860 when the harbour station was opened.

The Great North of Scotland Railway (GNoS) took over the line in 1867 and operated it until grouping in 1923. Passing into British Railways ownership in 1948, the line was, like the rest of the former GNoS lines along the Moray coast, considered for closure as part of the Beeching report and closure notices were issued in 1963. Passenger services were withdrawn in July 1964 and the entire line finally closed to all traffic in 1968. Old postcards show how handy the station was for the large numbers of visitors who used the beach in the summer months.

== Station infrastructure ==
The halt was a simple structure with a short wooden platform, on the sea side of the single track line with no shelter or provision for goods traffic, closing in 1964 with no remains surviving on site. The golf club house was nearby. The OS map of 1902 does shows a Links Halt at the site of the 1914 platform without indicating any structures at the site.

== Micro-history ==
One source states that a Banff Harbour Halt existed between the Golf Club House Halt and Banff railway station at the top of one of the cliffs but it is not shown on the OS maps or listed elsewhere.

Preceding station	Historical railways	Following station
Bridgefoot Halt; Towards Grange	Great North of Scotland; Banff branch	Banff; Towards Banff

== See also ==
- List of Great North of Scotland Railway stations
