= Ladysbridge railway station =

Station in Aberdeenshire, Scotland

Ladysbridge Lady's Bridge
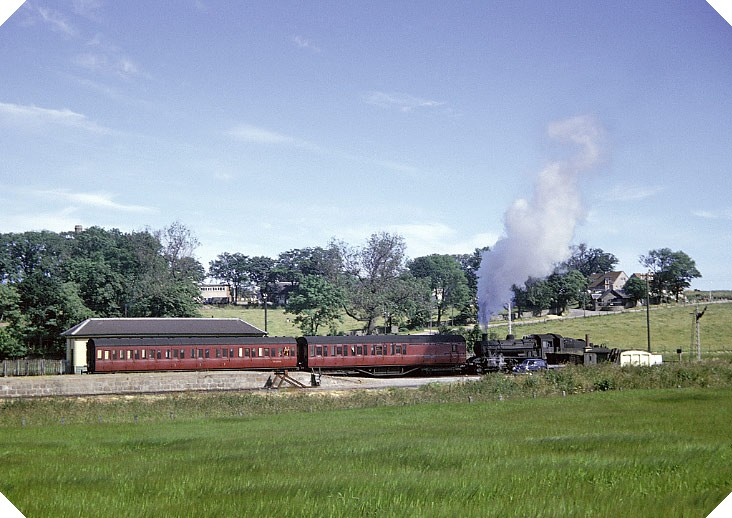
- Ladysbridge in 1964

General information
- Location: Banff, Aberdeenshire, Aberdeenshire; Scotland
- Coordinates: 57.660888°N 2.586143°W
- Grid reference: NJ 6512 6359
- Platforms: 1

Other information
- Status: Disused

History
- Original company: Banff, Portsoy and Strathisla Railway
- Pre-grouping: Great North of Scotland Railway
- Post-grouping: London and North Eastern Railway

Key dates
- 30 July 1859: Opened as Lady's Bridge
- June 1886: Renamed Ladysbridge
- 6 July 1964: Closed to passengers
- 1968: line closed to all traffic
Location

Ladysbridge railway station was a station in Aberdeenshire, Scotland. Opened as Lady's Bridge railway station in 1859 it was renamed Ladysbridge railway station by June 1886. The station was in the Parish of Boyndie close to the Banff County Lunatic Asylum or Ladysbridge Hospital. The line from Tillynaught opened in 1859 and a temporary terminus opened at Banff on 30 July 1859 and a permanent station opened in 1860. There was a single platform.

The Great North of Scotland Railway (GNoSR) took over the line in 1867 and operated it until grouping in 1923. Passing into British Railways ownership in 1948, the line was, like the rest of the former GNoSR lines along the Moray coast, considered for closure as part of the Beeching report and closure notices were issued in 1963. Passenger services were withdrawn in July 1964 and the entire line, including Banff station finally closed to all traffic in 1968.

== Station infrastructure ==
The station was located on a single line with no passing loop, a wooden ticket office and waiting room and a single siding with a loading dock. In 1928 two sidings, an island loading dock, several goods yard buildings and a weighing machine are shown with an additional building near the ticket office. No signal box is indicated. Two semi-detached station cottages are shown. In 1963 the station was still staffed and signals were present, on the wood faced platform and on the line towards Banff.

The old station building served for 30 years as changing rooms at Whitehills before being demolished in 2011. The station site has been redeveloped and nothing remains of the station.

Preceding station	Historical railways	Following station
Ordens; Towards Grange	Great North of Scotland; Banff branch	Bridgefoot Halt; Towards Banff

== See also ==
- List of Great North of Scotland Railway stations
