= Cornhill railway station =

Railway stop in Aberdeenshire, Scotland

Cornhill

General information
- Location: Banff, Aberdeenshire, Aberdeenshire; Scotland
- Coordinates: 57.617934°N 2.703886°W
- Grid reference: NJ 5805 5888
- Platforms: 1

Other information
- Status: Disused

History
- Original company: Banff, Portsoy and Strathisla Railway
- Pre-grouping: Great North of Scotland Railway
- Post-grouping: London and North Eastern Railway

Key dates
- 30 July 1859: Opened
- 6 May 1968: Closed to passengers and freight
Location

Cornhill railway station was an intermediate stop situated on the Great North of Scotland Railway (GNoSR) line from Cairnie Junction to Tillynaught. There was only a single platform at Cornhill that served the nearby village that lies in Fordyce Parish, of what was once Banffshire, 8 1/2 miles (13.7 km) from Banff itself. The line ran to Tillynaught where it split to reach Banff by a branch line or Elgin by the Moray Coast line.

Cornhill was opened in 1859 by the Banff, Portsoy and Strathisla Railway, and in 1867 was absorbed by the GNoSR who took over the line and operated it until grouping in 1923. Passing into British Railways ownership in 1948, the line was, like the rest of the ex-GNoSR lines along the Moray coast, considered for closure as part of the Beeching report and closure notices were issued in 1963. Passenger and freight services were withdrawn in May 1968.

== Station infrastructure ==
The surviving station building was constructed circa 1886 and was built of wood. Two sidings, a crane and a coal loading dock are shown in 1902. An auction mart is shown next to the station that was still present in 1988.

In 2011 much of this station remained, the station building, single platform, goods shed, loading bank and the station master's house. The station site was in use as a coal yard.

Preceding station	Historical railways	Following station
Glenbarry; Towards Grange	Great North of Scotland; Banff branch 1884–1886	Tillynaught; Towards Banff

== See also ==
- List of Great North of Scotland Railway stations
