= Bridgefoot Halt railway station =

Disused railway station in England

Bridgefoot Halt

General information
- Location: Banff, Aberdeenshire, Aberdeenshire; Scotland
- Coordinates: 57.668221°N 2.555022°W
- Grid reference: NJ 3670 8644
- Platforms: 1

Other information
- Status: Disused

History
- Pre-grouping: Great North of Scotland Railway
- Post-grouping: London and North Eastern Railway

Key dates
- 1902: Bridgefoot Halt present
- 1914: Opened with a platform
- 6 July 1964: Closed to passengers
- 1968: Line closed to all traffic
Location

Bridgefoot Halt railway station was opened in 1914. The halt was in the settlement of Bridgefoot close to the town of Banff. The line from Tillynaught opened in 1859 and a temporary terminus opened at Banff on 30 July 1859 and a permanent station opened in 1860. Bridgehouse Halt had a single platform and was opened by the GNoSR. The OS map of 1902 shows a 'Halt' at the site of the 1914 platform without indicating any structure at the site.

The Great North of Scotland Railway (GNoSR) took over the line in 1867 and operated it until grouping in 1923. Passing into British Railways ownership in 1948, the line was, like the rest of the former GNoSR lines along the Moray coast, considered for closure as part of the Beeching report and closure notices were issued in 1963. Passenger services were withdrawn in July 1964 and the entire line finally closed to all traffic in 1968.

== Station infrastructure ==
The halt was a simple structure with a small shelter and a short wooden platform, with no provision for goods traffic, closing in 1964 with no significant remains surviving on site. The OS map of 1902 does show a 'Halt' at the site of the 1914 platform without indicating any structure at the site.

Preceding station	Historical railways	Following station
Ladysbridge; Towards Grange	Great North of Scotland; Banff branch	Golf Club House Halt; Towards Banff

== See also ==
- List of Great North of Scotland Railway stations
