= Women's Bridge =

Women's Bridge or Woman's Bridge may refer to:

- Waterloo Bridge, a road bridge in London, England
- Puente de la Mujer, a footbridge in Buenos Aires, Argentina

== See also ==
- Lady's Bridge (disambiguation)
