= Moray Coast Railway =

Former railway line in Scotland

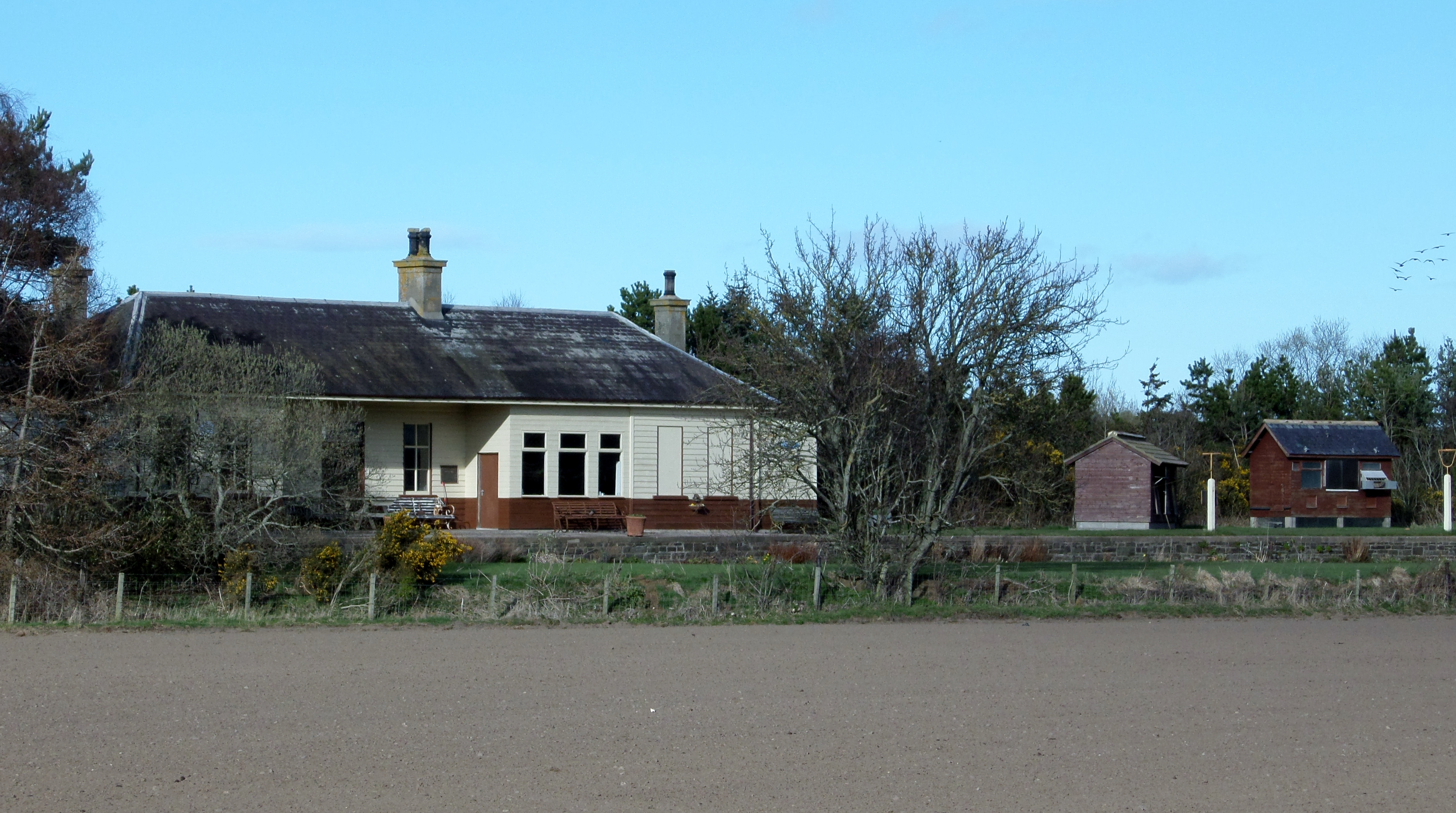
- Spey Bay railway station in 2014

Overview
- Locale: Morayshire, Scotland
- Stations: 14

History
- Opened: 1 April 1884
- Completed: 1 May 1886
- Closed: 6 May 1968

Technical
- Track length: 25 mi (40 km)
- Track gauge: 1,435 mm (4 ft 8 1/2 in) standard gauge

The Moray Coast Railway was a heavy rail route in Morayshire, Scotland. It was opened in three phases by the Great North of Scotland Railway (GNoSR) between 1884 and 1886. The line ran from the Banff, Portsoy and Strathisla Railway in Portsoy to the Morayshire Railway in Elgin. Trains were operated by the Great North of Scotland Railway until 1923, when the route was taken over by the London and North Eastern Railway (LNER). The LNER operated the route from 1923 until 1948 when Britain's railways were nationalised to form British Railways, who operated the route until its closure in 1968.

== Opening ==
Great North of Scotland (Buckie Extension) Railway Act 1882
- Act of Parliament
- Parliament of the United Kingdom
- Long title: An Act to authorise the construction of a Railway from the Great North of Scotland Railway at Portsoy to Elgin; and for other purposes.
- Citation: 45 & 46 Vict. c. cxxvi

Dates
- Royal assent: 12 July 1882

Text of statute as originally enacted

The Great North of Scotland Railway put a bill to Parliament in 1881 to extend its Grange to Portsoy line along the Moray coast as far as Buckie. In 1882 the GNoSR applied for permission to build a 25 1/4-mile (41 km) line from Portsoy to Elgin via Buckie; this was approved as the Great North of Scotland (Buckie Extension) Railway Act 1882 (45 & 46 Vict. c. cxxvi). The first 4 1/2-mile (7 km) section was opened between Portsoy and Tochieneal in 1884 with one intermediate station at Glassaugh. The following year the section between Garmouth and the Morayshire Railway in Elgin was opened, with intermediate stations at Urquhart and Calcots. Finally in 1886, the line was completed between Garmouth and Tochieneal, with intermediate stations at Spey Bay, Portgordon, Buckpool, Buckie, Portessie, Findochty, Portknockie and Cullen. The Countess of Seafield did not allow a direct route to be built through Cullen House grounds so three large viaducts were built over the town.

== Operation ==
The line mainly served the farming and fishing communities along the Moray coast, but also carried whisky traffic. When the London and North Eastern Railway took over the route in 1923 a Sunday service was introduced, at the time a rarity in Northern Scotland. When British Railways took over operations in 1948, a through coach between Glasgow Buchanan Street and Elgin was introduced on summer Saturdays. This lasted until 1962. Full passenger and freight service continued along the route until 1964, when freight services between Buckie and Elgin were withdrawn. The line was highlighted for closure in the 1963 Reshaping of British Railways and the line closed to all traffic in 1968.

== Closure ==
The first part of the line to close was Tochieneal railway station, closing to passengers on 1 October 1951. Glassaugh railway station followed suit on 21 September 1953 and closed to passenger traffic. On 7 March 1960 Buckpool station closed to passengers, but closed to all traffic four years later as freight services between Buckie and Elgin were withdrawn. The route itself was highlighted for closure in the 1963 Reshaping of British Railways report. Remaining stations on the route closed to all traffic on 6 May 1968 and track was subsequently lifted.

== The route today ==
The line from near Garmouth to Cullen now forms part of the Moray Coast Trail, a long-distance walking route running from Forres to Cullen. The route has been developed on in all of the settlements it passed through, but remains mostly untouched outside of them. Some infrastructure remains, such as the Cullen viaducts, the Spey Viaduct, a footbridge in Buckpool and the station buildings at Portsoy railway station and Spey Bay railway station. Multiple bridges also survive along the line.
