= Milltown of Rothiemay =

Village in Moray, Scotland

Coordinates: 57.5226°N 2.7565°W

Miltown of Rothiemay: Scottish Gaelic: Ràth a' Mhuigh
- Location within Moray
- Council area: Moray
- Lieutenancy area: Banffshire
- Country: Scotland
- Sovereign state: United Kingdom
- Post town: HUNTLY
- Postcode district: AB54
- Dialling code: 01466
- Police: Scotland
- Fire: Scottish
- Ambulance: Scottish
- UK Parliament: Moray
- Scottish Parliament: Banffshire and Buchan Coast

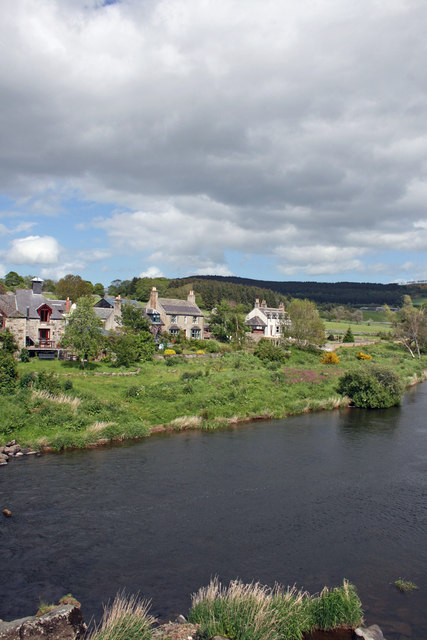
Looking across the River Deveron to Milltown of Rothiemay

Milltown of Rothiemay (Scottish Gaelic: Ràth a' Mhuigh) is a small inland village, built mostly of granite, in the north-east of Scotland and is within the Moray council area bordering neighbouring Aberdeenshire across the river to the south-east. Historically part of Banffshire, it is around six miles (ten kilometres) north of Huntly, and 8 miles (13 kilometres) east of Keith. It lies on the banks of the River Deveron, close to where it joins the River Isla. The village has existed for several centuries.

The 17th-century cartographer James Gordon (1617–1686) was from Rothiemay. It was the birthplace of James Ferguson FRS (1710–1776), instrument-maker and astronomer. More recently, BBC radio presenter James Naughtie was born and brought up in the village.

Rothiemay Castle, partly dating from the 15th century, was rebuilt as a baronial country house in 1788, by James Duff, 2nd Earl Fife. The castle was demolished in 1963.

The village has its own primary school, and formerly had a railway station by the River Deveron 2 1/8 miles (3.4 kilometres) from the village. Almost all trace of the station has been lost although trains still operate on the Keith to Huntly mainline.

Irvine Laidlaw was made a life peer as Baron Laidlaw, of Rothiemay on 14 June 2004.
