= Portsoy railway station =

Former railway station in Scotland

Portsoy
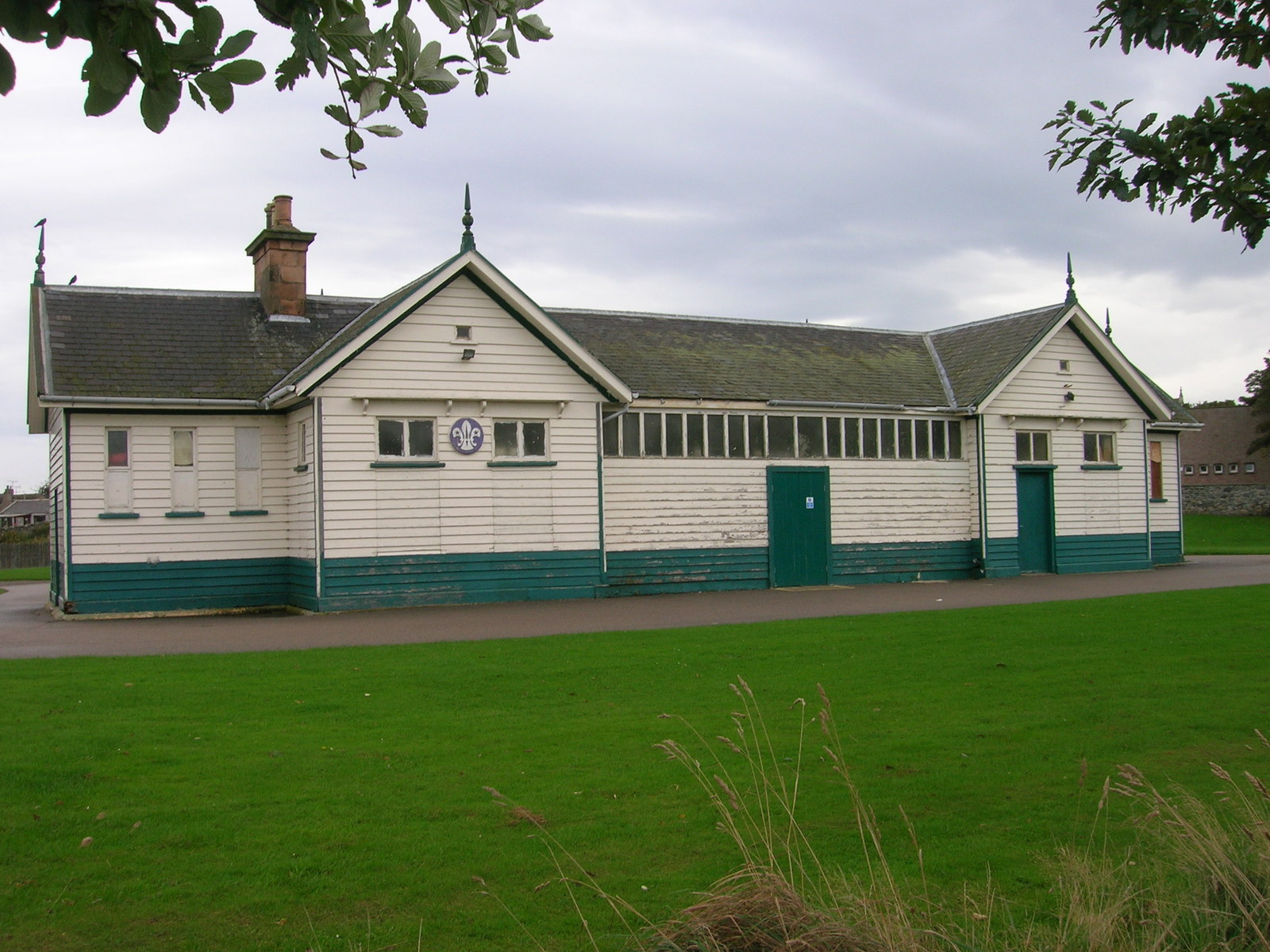
- The former Portsoy station building, now used as a Scout hall.

General information
- Location: Portsoy, Aberdeenshire; Scotland
- Coordinates: 57.6794°N 2.691°W

Other information
- Status: Disused

History
- Original company: Banff, Portsoy and Strathisla Railway
- Pre-grouping: Great North of Scotland Railway
- Post-grouping: London and North Eastern Railway

Key dates
- 30 July 1859: Opened
- 1 April 1884: Moved and line to Tochieneal opened
- 1 May 1886: Coast Line opened
- 6 May 1968: Closed
Location

Portsoy railway station was a railway station in Portsoy, in current day Aberdeenshire. Opened in 1859 by the Banff, Portsoy and Strathisla Railway, it was absorbed by the Great North of Scotland Railway in 1867. The original terminus closed in 1884 and a new station opened nearby on a through route and two years later, after the Moray Firth coast line opened, the station was served by Aberdeen to Elgin trains.

The Great North of Scotland Railway was absorbed by the London and North Eastern Railway in 1923 and became part of British Railways when the railways were nationalised in 1948. The station was recommended for closure by Dr Beeching's report "The Reshaping of British Railways" and closed on 6 May 1968.

== History ==
=== Banff, Portsoy and Strathisla ===
The Banff, Portsoy and Strathisla Railway opened on 30 July 1859, with a 16 1/4 miles (26.2 km) line from Banff to Grange, on the Great North of Scotland Railway (GNoSR) main line, with a 3 1/4 miles (5.2 km) branch from Tillynaught to Portsoy. Beyond the Portsoy passenger terminus was a steeply graded line, at 1 in 30, to the harbour, restricted to a locomotive and four wagons.

The GNoSR took over services on 1 February 1863, and the railway renamed the Banffshire Railway. An extension to Portgordon was authorised, but this was abandoned in 1867 and the Banffshire absorbed by the GNoSR.

=== Moray Coast Line ===
1904 OS map of Portsoy showing harbour branch (in green), and the two stations

The extension to Portgordon was revived and extended along the Moray Firth coast to Elgin. A new station was built at Portsoy for this through line, which opened, together with a 4 1/2 miles (7.2 km) extension to Tochieneal, on 1 April 1884. The Countess of Seafield had not allowed a direct route to be built through Cullen House policies so a massive viaduct was built over the town. The former passenger station was kept for goods. After the Moray Coast Line opened on 1 May 1886, through Aberdeen to Elgin services called at the station. The harbour branch was little used after the opening of the Coast Line and the tracks lifted in 1910.

In the 1921 Grouping, the Great North of Scotland Railway was absorbed by the London and North Eastern Railway. This was nationalised in 1948, and services provided by British Railways. The station and line was recommended for closure by Dr Beeching's in his report "The Reshaping of British Railways" closed on 6 May 1968.

The station was host to a LNER camping coach from 1935 to 1939 and possibly one for some of 1934. A camping coach was also positioned here by the Scottish Region from 1952 to 1960.

=== Portsoy Scout Hut ===
The 1884 station, a weatherboarded, gabled, single storey building, double cruciform in plan, survived the closure of the railway and is now used as a Scout hall. It is a Category C listed building. Between 2011 and 2016, it was one of five buildings to be renovated as part of the Portsoy Conservation Area Regeneration Scheme, which was funded by Historic Scotland.

== Services ==
After the GNoSR took over services, Portsoy had six trains a day to Tillynaught, three reversing to continue to Banff. Initially the branch services were extended to Tochieneal when the line reached there, and in 1886, after the Coast Line was complete, the station was served by four through trains a day between Aberdeen to Elgin. The speed of trains increased, so that in 1896 Locomotive Magazine was able to record a run from Aberdeen to Elgin that completed the 61 miles (98 km) in 1 1/4 hours.

In summer 1948, Portsoy was served by four Aberdeen to Inverness trains, with Portsoy about 2 hours from Aberdeen. There was also a mid-day Keith Town to Inverness service and an evening service from Aberdeen that terminated at Elgin. There were three services from Inverness to Aberdeen, a service from Lossiemouth and Elgin to Aberdeen and a Saturday service from Inverness to Keith that after 19 June was accelerated and extended to Aberdeen. There were no Sunday services.

Preceding station	Historical railways	Following station
Tillynaught	Banff, Portsoy and Strathisla; Great North of Scotland; Portsoy branch 1859–1884	Terminus
Tillynaught; Towards Grange	Great North of Scotland; Portsoy branch 1884–1886	Glassaugh; Towards Tochnineal
Tillynaught; Towards Keith and Aberdeen	Great North of Scotland; London and North Eastern; British Railways; Moray Coast Line; 1886–1968	Glassaugh; Towards Elgin and Inverness
