= Grange railway station (Scotland) =

Former railway station in Scotland

Grange
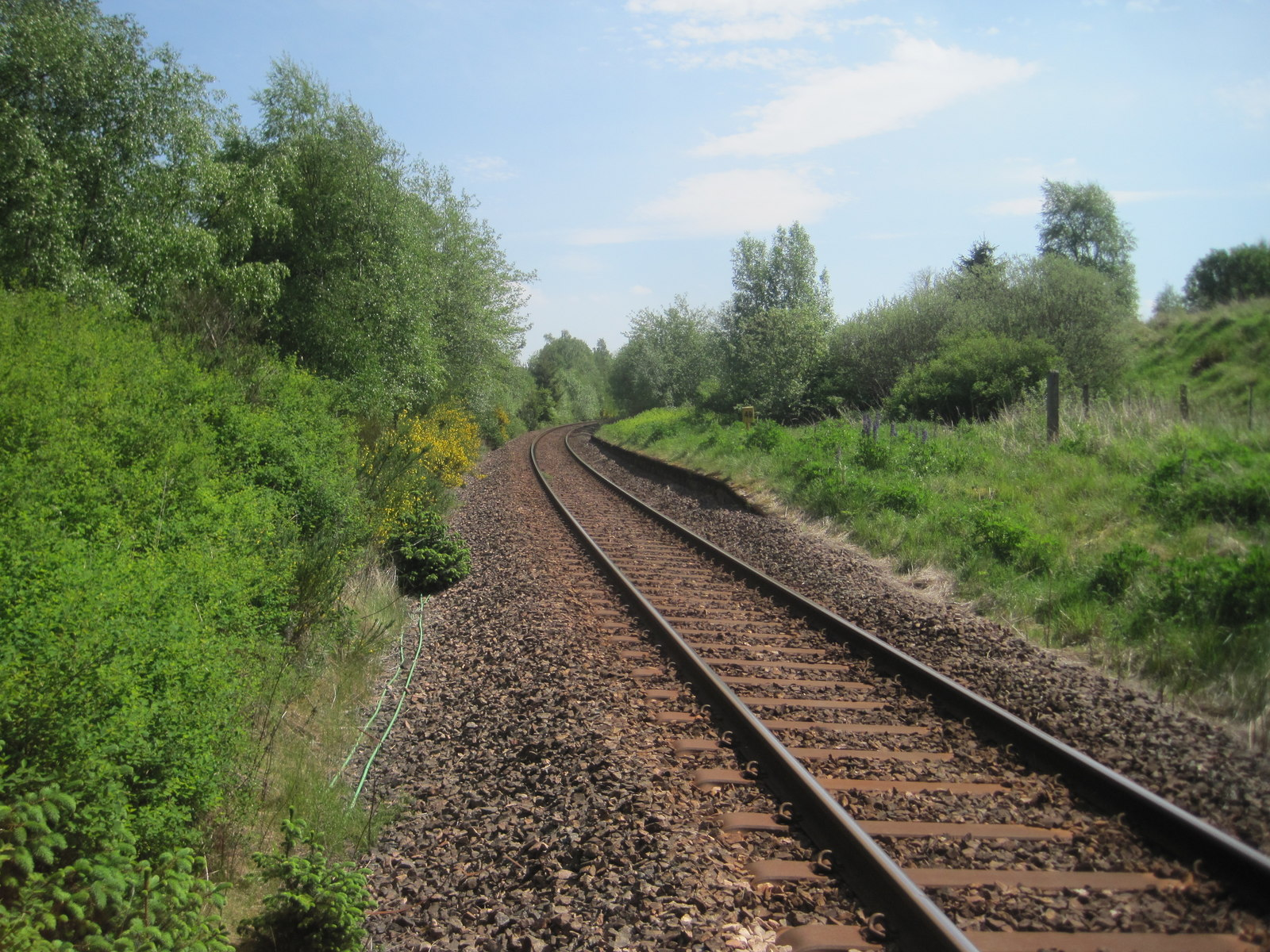
- The site of the station in 2017

General information
- Location: Grange, Banffshire (current day Moray); Scotland
- Coordinates: 57.5424°N 2.8433°W

Other information
- Status: Disused

History
- Original company: Great North of Scotland Railway; Banff, Portsoy and Strathisla Railway
- Pre-grouping: Great North of Scotland Railway
- Post-grouping: London and North Eastern Railway

Key dates
- 5 January 1857: Opened
- 20 July 1859: Branch line opened
- 7 March 1960: Curve to Coast Line closed
- 6 May 1968: Closed
Location

Grange railway station was a railway station in the parish of Grange, historically in Banffshire (although currently in Moray). Opened in 1856 by the Great North of Scotland Railway, three years later it became a junction station after the Banff, Portsoy and Strathisla Railway built a branch to Banff and Portsoy.

The Great North of Scotland Railway was absorbed by the London and North Eastern Railway in 1923 and became part of British Railways when the railways were nationalised in 1948. The station was recommended for closure by Dr Beeching's report "The Reshaping of British Railways" and closed on 6 May 1968. The railway remains open as the Aberdeen to Inverness Line.

== History ==
The Great North of Scotland Railway had opened its first line, from Kittybrewster, near Aberdeen, to Huntly, in 1854. An extension of this line to Keith opened on 10 October 1856.

On 30 July 1859 the Banff, Portsoy and Strathisla Railway opened a 16 1/4 miles (26.2 km) line from Grange to Banff and a 3 1/4 miles (5.2 km) branch from Tillynaught to Portsoy. The GNoSR took over services on 1 February 1863, and the railway renamed the Banffshire Railway. An extension to Portgordon was authorised, but this was abandoned in 1867 and the Banffshire absorbed by the GNoSR. The line to Portgordon was later revived and extended along the Moray Firth coast to Elgin, and this opened on 1 May 1886. A curve was opened at the junction to allow Aberdeen trains direct access to the Coast Line without reversing at the station.

In 1923 the Great North of Scotland Railway was absorbed by the London and North Eastern Railway. This was nationalised in 1948, and services provided by British Railways. The stopping services on the Aberdeen to Inverness Line were recommended to be withdrawn in Dr Beeching's report "The Reshaping of British Railways", and the station closed on 6 May 1968.

== Services ==
Initially there were five services a day between Aberdeen and Keith, although this was later reduced to four. After the GNoSR took over branch services there were three trains a day to Banff.

In summer 1948 Grange was served by eight trains to and from Aberdeen, with Grange about 1 1/2 to 2 hours from Aberdeen. A complex system of train portion working towards Inverness gave a service of 4 trains a day over the direct route via Mulben, three via Craigellachie (four on Sundays) and four via the Coast line. There were no Sunday services.

Preceding station	Historical railways	Following station
Cairnie Junction; Towards Aberdeen	Great North of Scotland; Main Line	Keith; Towards Elgin and Inverness
Terminus	Banff, Portsoy and Strathisla; Great North of Scotland; Banff branch	Millegin
