= Banff railway station (Scotland) =

Disused railway station in Banff, Aberdeenshire

Banff Banff Harbour
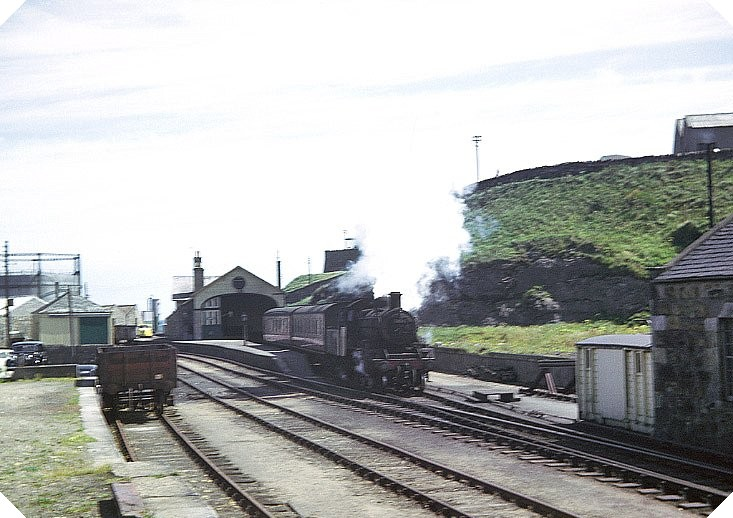
- A passenger train leaving the station in June 1964

General information
- Location: Banff, Aberdeenshire; Scotland
- Coordinates: 57.6703°N 2.5251°W
- Grid reference: NJ687646
- Platforms: 2

Other information
- Status: Disused

History
- Original company: Banff, Portsoy and Strathisla Railway
- Pre-grouping: Great North of Scotland Railway
- Post-grouping: London and North Eastern Railway

Key dates
- 1 May 1860: Opened as Banff Harbour
- 1928: Renamed Banff
- 6 July 1964: Closed to passengers
- 6 May 1968: Closed to all traffic
Location

Banff railway station was the railway station serving the town of Banff, Banffshire.

== History ==
The line from Tillynaught opened in 1859 and a temporary terminus opened on 30 July 1859. A permanent station opened the following year. As originally built, there was a single platform and a goods line through to the quayside at Banff harbour, but that was cut back prior to 1900, when a second platform line was constructed.

The Great North of Scotland Railway (GNoS) took over the line in 1867 and operated it until the grouping in 1923. Passing into British Railways ownership in 1948, the line was, like the rest of the former GNoS lines along the Moray coast, considered for closure as part of the Beeching report, and closure notices were issued in 1963. Passenger services were withdrawn in 1964 and the entire line, including Banff station, was closed in 1968.

| Preceding station | Historical railways | Following station |
|---|---|---|
| Golf Club House Halt; Towards Grange | Great North of Scotland; Banff branch | Terminus |
