= Cairnie Junction railway station =

Disused railway station in Cairnie, Aberdeenshire

Cairnie Junction
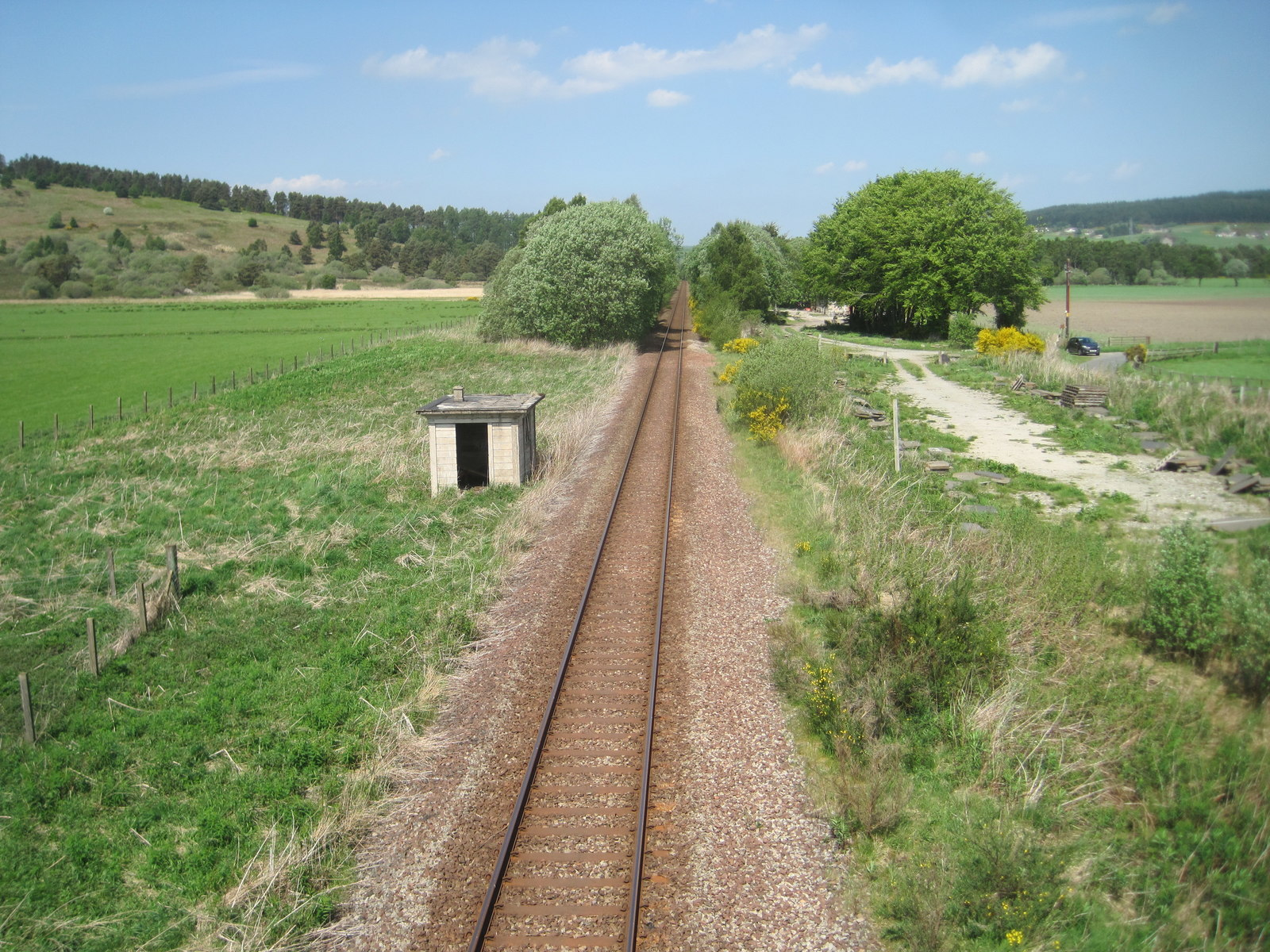
- Site of the former station (2017)

General information
- Location: Cairnie, Aberdeenshire; Scotland
- Coordinates: 57.53381°N 2.82902°W
- Grid reference: NJ504496
- Platforms: 2

Other information
- Status: Disused

History
- Opened: 1 June 1898; 127 years ago
- Closed: 6 May 1968; 57 years ago
- Original company: Great North of Scotland Railway
- Pre-grouping: Great North of Scotland Railway
- Post-grouping: London and North Eastern Railway
Location

Cairnie Junction railway station served the village of Cairnie, Aberdeenshire, Scotland from 1898 to 1968 on the Great North of Scotland Railway.

== History ==
The station opened on 1 June 1898 by the Great North of Scotland Railway. The station closed to both passengers and goods traffic on 6 May 1968.

| Preceding station | Historical railways | Following station |
|---|---|---|
| Rothiemay; Line open, station closed | Great North of Scotland Railway | Grange; Line open, station closed |
