= Rothiemay railway station =

Disused railway station in Milltown of Rothiemay, Aberdeenshire

Rothiemay
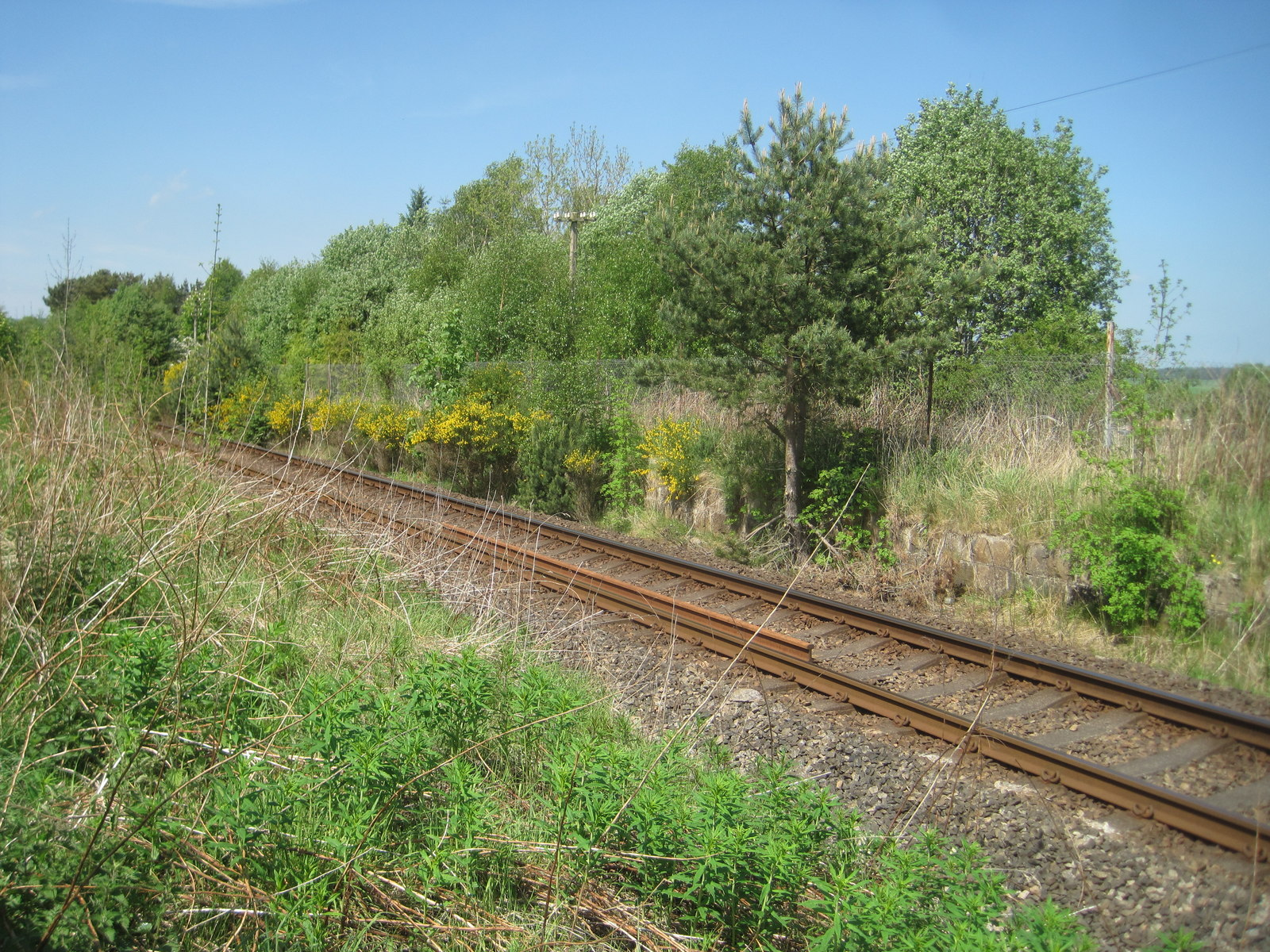
- The site of the station in 2017

General information
- Location: Milltown of Rothiemay, Aberdeenshire; Scotland
- Coordinates: 57.5021°N 2.7834°W
- Grid reference: NJ531460
- Platforms: 2

Other information
- Status: Disused

History
- Original company: Great North of Scotland Railway
- Pre-grouping: Great North of Scotland Railway
- Post-grouping: LNER

Key dates
- 11 October 1856: Opened
- 6 May 1968: Closed
Location

Rothiemay railway station served the village of Milltown of Rothiemay, Aberdeenshire, Scotland from 1856 to 1968 on the Great North of Scotland Railway.

== History ==
The station was opened on 11 October 1856 by the Great North of Scotland Railway. It closed to both passengers and goods traffic on 6 May 1968.

Preceding station	Historical railways	Following station
Huntly; Line and station open	Great North of Scotland Railway	Cairnie Junction; Line open, station closed
