= Tochieneal railway station =

Former railway station in Scotland

Tochieneal

General information
- Location: Tochieneal, Moray; Scotland
- Coordinates: 57.67814°N 2.800212°W
- Grid reference: NJ 5238 6565
- Platforms: 2

Other information
- Status: Disused

History
- Pre-grouping: Great North of Scotland Railway
- Post-grouping: London and North Eastern Railway

Key dates
- 1 April 1884: Great North of Scotland station opened
- 1 October 1951: Closed
Location

Tochieneal railway station was a railway station that served the small industrial village of Tochieneal, close to Cullen in Moray. The railway station was opened by the Great North of Scotland Railway (GNoSR) on its Moray Firth coast line in 1884. The station closed to regular passenger traffic on 1 October 1951, more than a decade before the total closure of the line itself in 1968.

In 1923 the GNoSR became part of the London and North Eastern Railway and at nationalisation in 1948 became part of British Railways. The line itself was later recommended for closure by Dr Beeching's report "The Reshaping of British Railways" and closed on 6 May 1968.

== History ==
=== Background ===
In 1881 the Great North of Scotland Railway put a bill to parliament to extend its Portsoy line along the Moray Firth as far as Buckie. In 1882 the Great North of Scotland applied for permission to build a 25 1/4-mile (40.6 km) line from Portsoy following the coast to Buckie and then running on to Elgin.

=== Great North of Scotland Railway ===
The GNoSR station opened as 'Tochieneal' on 1 April 1884 with the central section of the coast line, served by through Aberdeen to Elgin trains. In 1923 the Great North of Scotland Railway was absorbed by the London and North Eastern Railway. This was nationalised in 1948, and services provided by British Railways until the station closed in 1951. The line itself was recommended for closure by Dr Beeching's in his report "The Reshaping of British Railways" and closed on 6 May 1968.

== Services ==
The GNoSR station was served by through trains running between Aberdeen and Elgin. There were no Sunday services.

== The station infrastructure ==
Tochieneal station had two platforms, a passing loop, originally two signal boxes, a water tower and a road bridge overlooked the site.The 1902 OS map shows station buildings on both platforms and a foot bridge. A station agent's or stationmaster's cottage sat near to the site. Several sidings were present with a loading dock and a goods shed. The station was host to a LNER camping coach from 1935 to 1939 and possibly one for some of 1934.

The line was predominantly single track apart from a double track section between Buckie and Portessie. Track lifting took place shortly after closure in 1968.

=== Station remnants ===
In 2009 the loading dock survived intact.

Preceding station	Historical railways	Following station
Cullen	Great North of Scotland	Glassaugh
