= Huntly railway station =

Railway station in Aberdeenshire, Scotland

Huntly Scottish Gaelic: Hunndaidh
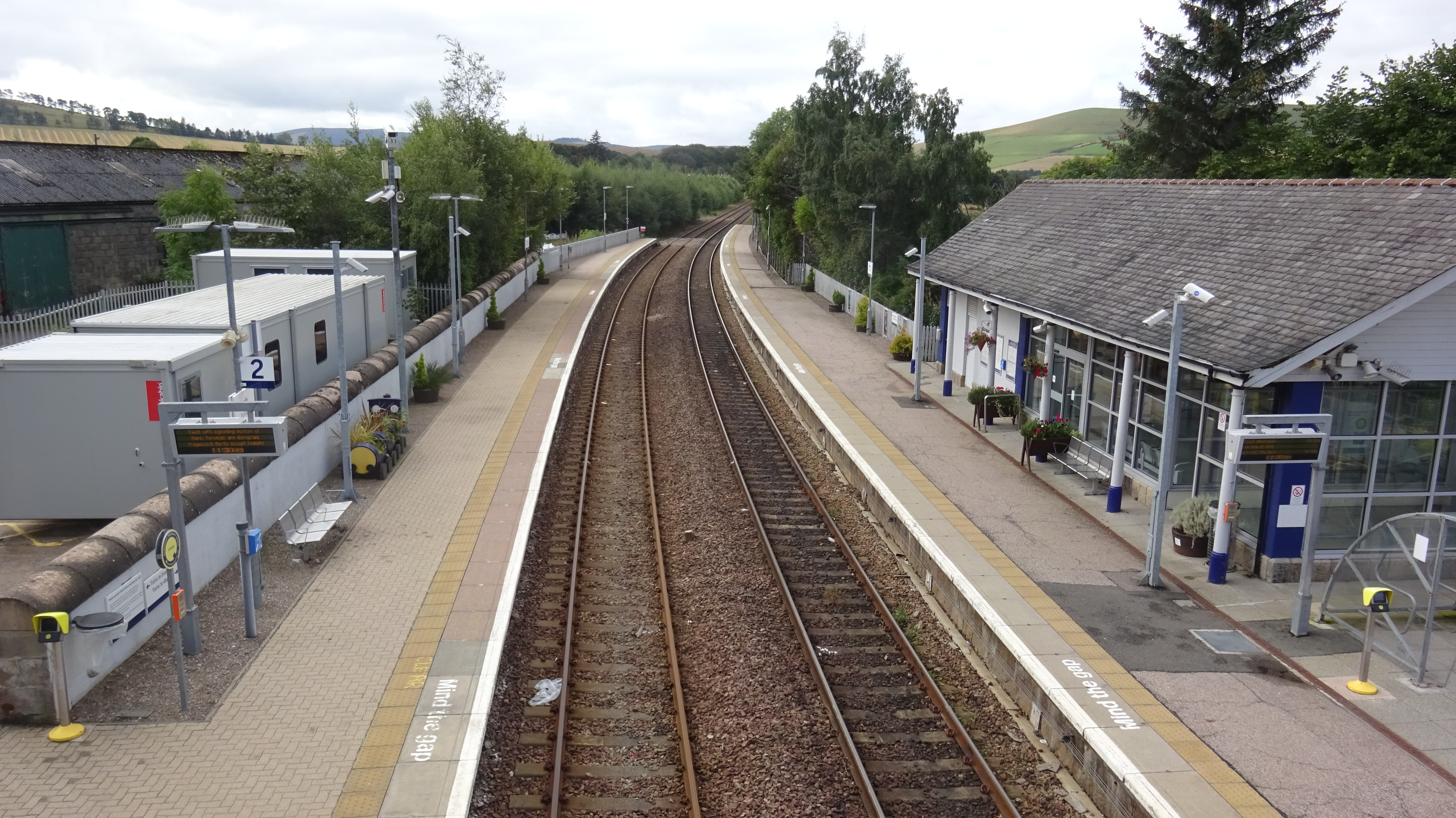
- Looking south towards Insch from the footbridge

General information
- Location: Huntly, Aberdeenshire; Scotland
- Coordinates: 57.4445°N 2.7758°W
- Grid reference: NJ535396
- Managed by: ScotRail
- Platforms: 2

Other information
- Station code: HNT

History
- Original company: Great North of Scotland Railway
- Pre-grouping: Great North of Scotland Railway
- Post-grouping: LNER

Key dates
- 20 September 1854: Opened

Passengers
- 2020/21: ▼12,612
- 2021/22: ▲44,894
- 2022/23: ▲49,568
- 2023/24: ▲60,956
- 2024/25: ▲65,636
Location
Notes
- Passenger statistics from the Office of Rail and Road

Huntly railway station is a railway station serving the town of Huntly in Scotland. The station is managed by ScotRail and is on the Aberdeen to Inverness Line, between Insch and Keith, 40 miles 67 chains (65.7 km) from Aberdeen.

== History ==
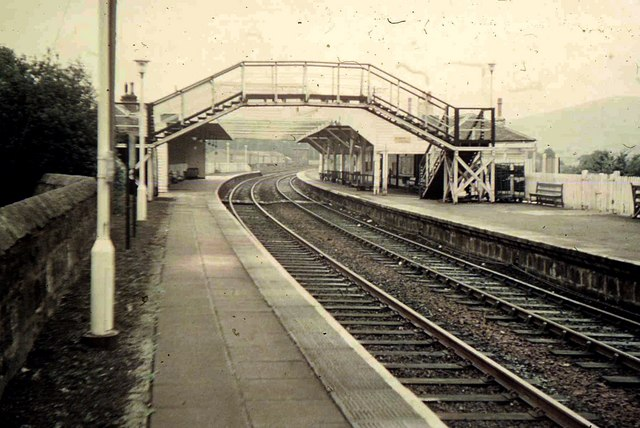
The station seen circa 1971

The station was opened by the Great North of Scotland Railway on 20 September 1854, with the commissioning of the line from the original Waterloo terminus in Aberdeen. The route onwards to Keith followed on 11 October 1856, with the through link to the new joint station at Aberdeen completed in November 1867 to connect the GNSR to the Aberdeen Railway. The track was doubled in 1896, when a non-stop train from Aberdeen was speeded up to a 45-minute schedule for the 40 3/4 mi (65.6 km), though it ceased when the overnight London express was slowed later that year.

The original station building, which had an overall roof and was described in 1898 as, "a decent structure of the old fashioned 'roofed-over' type", was later demolished and replaced.

== Facilities ==
The station's ticket office is staffed six days per week.. A self-service ticket machine is provided for use outside of these times and for collecting advance purchase tickets. A pay phone and post box are available, along with shelters on each platform and toilets in the booking hall (the latter open only when the station is staffed). Train running information is offered via customer help points, CIS displays, automatic announcements and timetable posters. Step-free access is available to both platforms via ramps, though the footbridge linking them has steps.

== Passenger volume ==
Passenger Volume at Huntly
	2004–05	2005–06	2006–07	2007–08	2008–09	2009–10	2010–11	2011–12	2012–13	2013–14	2014–15	2015–16	2016–17	2017–18	2018–19	2019–20	2020–21	2021–22	2022–23	2023–24	2024–25
Entries and exits	69,533	70,430	75,708	84,223	87,894	84,300	90,010	93,796	94,026	98,276	104,534	105,846	94,904	92,956	77,782	72,090	12,612	44,894	49,568	60,956	65,636

The statistics cover twelve month periods that start in April.

== Services ==
As of May 2026, there is a basic two-hourly frequency in each directions (with peak extras), to Inverness northbound and Aberdeen southbound (12 trains southbound, 11 northbound). The first departure to Aberdeen each weekday and Saturday continues south to Edinburgh Waverley. On Sundays there are five trains each way.

Preceding station	National Rail	Following station
Insch	ScotRail; Aberdeen to Inverness Line	Keith
	Historical railways	
Rothiemay; Line open; Station closed	Great North of Scotland Railway	Gartly; Line open; Station closed

== Bibliography ==
- Brailsford, Martyn, ed. (December 2017) [1987]. Railway Track Diagrams 1: Scotland & Isle of Man (6th ed.). Frome: Trackmaps. ISBN 978-0-9549866-9-8.
- Butt, R. V. J. (October 1995). The Directory of Railway Stations: details every public and private passenger station, halt, platform and stopping place, past and present (1st ed.). Sparkford: Patrick Stephens Ltd. ISBN 978-1-85260-508-7. OCLC 60251199. OL 11956311M.
- Jowett, Alan (March 1989). Jowett's Railway Atlas of Great Britain and Ireland: From Pre-Grouping to the Present Day (1st ed.). Sparkford: Patrick Stephens Ltd. ISBN 978-1-85260-086-0. OCLC 22311137.
- Jowett, Alan (2000). Jowett's Nationalised Railway Atlas (1st ed.). Penryn, Cornwall: Atlantic Transport Publishers. ISBN 978-0-906899-99-1. OCLC 228266687.
