= Ladysbridge Hospital =

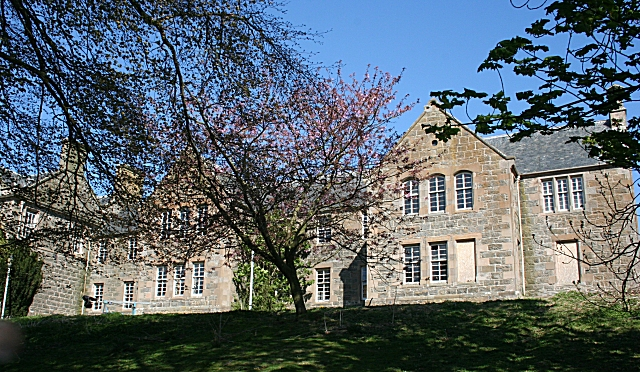
- Ladysbridge Hospital

- Shown in Aberdeenshire

Geography
- Location: Banff, Aberdeenshire, Scotland
- Coordinates: 57.6627°N 2.5904°W

Organisation
- Care system: NHS Scotland
- Type: Psychiatric hospital

Services
- Emergency department: No

History
- Founded: 1865
- Closed: 2003

Links
- Lists: Hospitals in Scotland

Ladysbridge Hospital was a mental health facility near Banff, Aberdeenshire, Scotland. The former hospital is a Category B listed building.

== History ==
The hospital, which was designed by Alexander Reid in the Tudor Revival style, opened as the Banff District Asylum in May 1865. A separate facility for female patients, briefly known as Woodpark Succursal Asylum, was built in June 1880 but was later fully amalgamated with the main asylum. An additional villa for male patients was completed in 1903. The asylum became Ladysbridge Mental Hospital in the 1920s and joined the National Health Service as Ladysbridge Hospital in 1948. A recreation hall was added in the 1960s.

After the introduction of Care in the Community in the early 1980s, the hospital went into a period of decline and closed in May 2003. The original main building was subsequently converted into terraced housing as "Ladysbridge House" within a larger development known as "Ladysbridge Village".

== See also ==
- Ladysbridge railway station
