= Tillynaught railway station =

Former railway station in Aberdeenshire, Scotland

Tillynaught
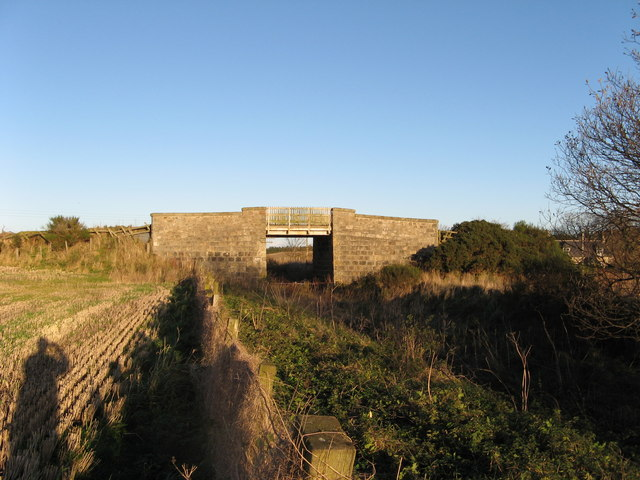
- The site of Tillynaught station

General information
- Location: Aberdeenshire; Scotland
- Coordinates: 57.643221°N 2.670789°W
- Grid reference: NJ 6005 6167
- Platforms: Three

Other information
- Status: Disused

History
- Original company: Banff, Portsoy and Strathisla Railway
- Pre-grouping: Great North of Scotland Railway
- Post-grouping: London and North Eastern Railway

Key dates
- 30 July 1859: Banff Line opened
- 1 April 1884: Line to Tochnineal opened
- 1 May 1886: Moray Coast Line opened
- 6 July 1964: Banff branch closed to passengers
- 6 May 1968: Banff and Moray Coast Lines closed to all traffic
Location

Tillynaught railway station or Tillynaught Junction was a junction railway station in what is now Aberdeenshire, Parish of Fordyce, 6 miles south-west of Banff. Tillynaught was opened in 1859 by the Banff, Portsoy and Strathisla Railway, and in 1867 was absorbed by the Great North of Scotland Railway(GNSR). This junction station was served by Aberdeen to Elgin trains as well as trains running to the branch terminus at Banff.

In 1923 the Great North of Scotland Railway was absorbed by the London and North Eastern Railway and in 1948 became part of British Railways. Recommended for closure by Dr Beeching's report "The Reshaping of British Railways" the station closed completely on 6 May 1968.

== History ==
=== Banff, Portsoy and Strathisla ===
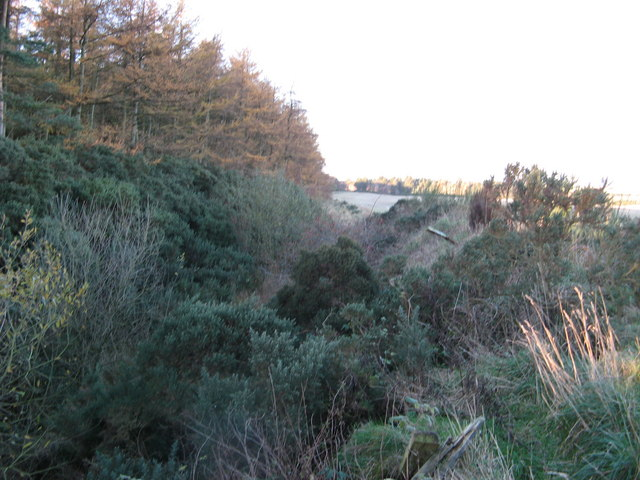
The old line to Portsoy near Tillynaight station.

The Banff, Portsoy and Strathisla Railway opened on 30 July 1859, with a 16 1/4 miles (26.2 km) line from Banff to Grange, on the Great North of Scotland Railway (GNSR) main line, with a 3 1/4 miles (5.2 km) branch from Tillynaught to Portsoy. On 1 February 1863 the GNSR took over services and the railway renamed the Banffshire Railway.

=== Moray Coast Line ===
A new station was built at Portsoy for the through line, which opened, together with a 4 1/2 miles (7.2 km) extension to Tochieneal, on 1 April 1884. The Countess of Seafield had not allowed a direct route to be built through Cullen House policies and to avoid the estate lands several bridges were and an impressive viaduct at Cullen had to be built. The Moray Coast Line opened on 1 May 1886, through Aberdeen to Elgin services called at Tillynaught.

In 1923 the Great North of Scotland Railway was absorbed by the London and North Eastern Railway and railway nationalisation followed in 1948, services then being delivered by British Railways. The station and the line via Buckie was recommended for closure by Dr Beeching's in The Reshaping of British Railways, closed on 6 May 1968.

=== The station infrastructure ===
In 1866-7 the station apparently had no sidings, possessing an island platform and only two buildings indicated. By 1902 the junction had two signal boxes, a pedestrian footbridge, a weighing machine and a complex arrangement of sidings and points. The Tillnaught Junction signalling diagram for 1934 shows a single wooden signal box, two sidings on the Banff side and the sign stated Change for Ladysbridge and Banff. The island platform once had an impressive overall canopy that had been removed by 1960.

After closure the station buildings were demolished and the platforms infilled. The nearby station master's house and ancillary houses have been converted into a private dwelling.

== Services ==
Tillynaught had six trains a day to Portsoy after being taken over by the GNSR, three of these reversed and continued to Banff. Tochieneal had services from when the line reached there in 1886. The Moray Coast Line was served by four through trains a day between Aberdeen to Elgin and these trains called at Tillynaught.

Portsoy was served by four Aberdeen to Inverness trains in the summer of 1948, with a mid-day Keith Town to Inverness service and an evening service from Aberdeen that terminated at Elgin. There were three through services from Inverness to Aberdeen, a service from Lossiemouth and Elgin to Aberdeen and a Saturday service from Inverness to Keith that after 19 June was accelerated and extended to Aberdeen. There were no Sunday services.

== Micro-history ==
The station was located in a very rural area and was named after a local farm and water mill.

Preceding station	Historical railways	Following station
Cornhill	Banff, Portsoy and Strathisla; Great North of Scotland; Portsoy branch 1859–1884	Portsoy
Cornhill; Towards Grange	Great North of Scotland; Banff branch 1884–1886	Ordens; Towards Banff
Cornhill; Towards Keith and Aberdeen	Great North of Scotland; London and North Eastern; British Railways; Moray Coast Line; 1886–1968	Portsoy; Towards Elgin and Inverness
