= Banff, Portsoy and Strathisla Railway =

Former railway line in Scotland

Overview
- Locale: Scotland

History
- Opened: 1859
- Successor line: Great North of Scotland Railway
- Closed: 1968

Technical
- Line length: 19 1/2 miles (31.4 km)
- Track gauge: 4 ft 8 1/2 in (1,435 mm)

The Banff, Portsoy and Strathisla Railway was a Scottish railway company that connected the Aberdeenshire ports of Banff and Portsoy with the main line of the Great North of Scotland Railway (GNoSR) main line at Grange, a place some distance east of Keith. The railway opened in 1859, and was renamed the Banffshire Railway in 1863 when the GNoSR began running services.

The company was constantly short of money, and it was absorbed by the GNoSR in 1867. In 1886 a railway line was opened connecting Portsoy with coastal communities to the west, and reaching Elgin. Trains from Aberdeen ran over the Banffshire line to Portsoy and continued on the new coast line.

The Banff section from Tillynaught closed to passengers in 1964 and completely in 1968; the line from Grange to Portsoy and the Moray Coast line closed completely in 1968.

== Construction ==
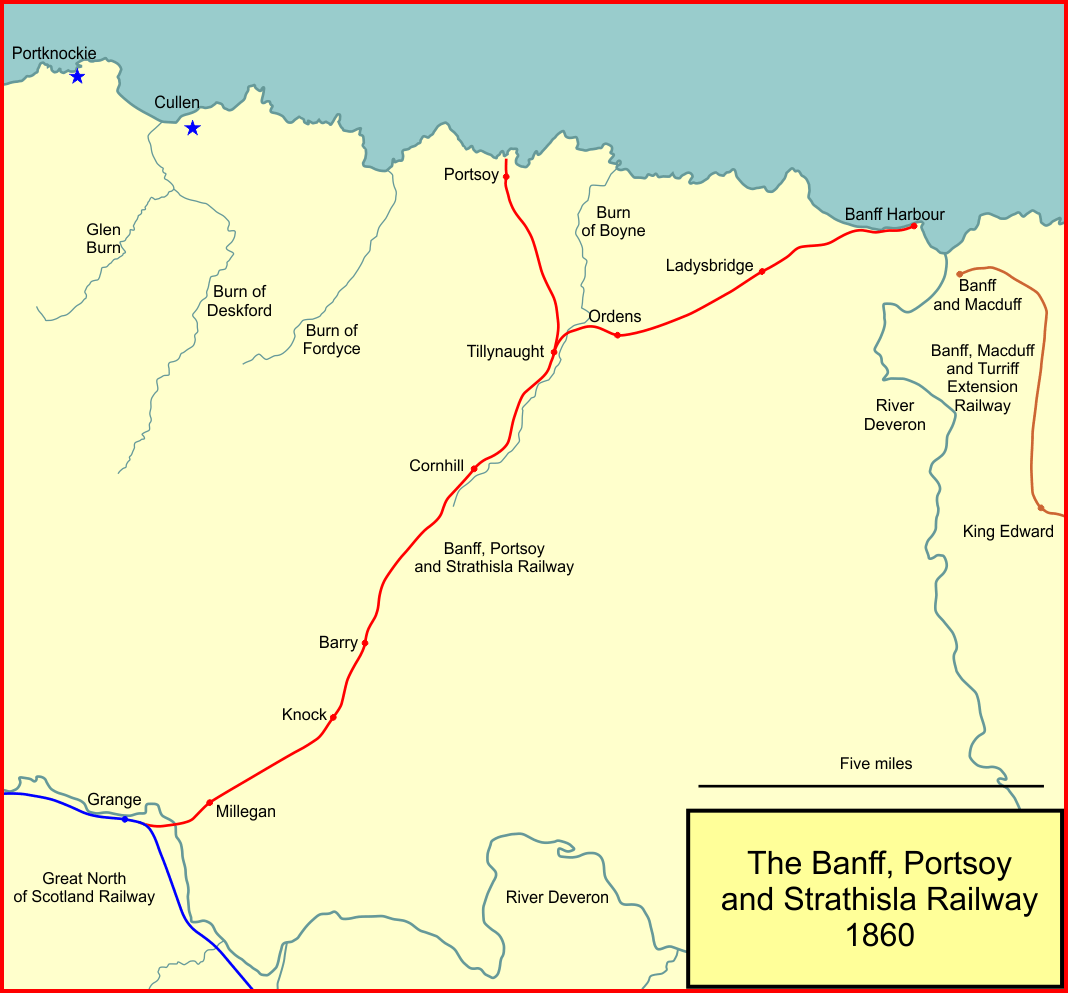
The Banff, Portsoy and Strathisla Railway in 1860

In 1840 the Aberdeen Railway opened its line from the south to that city, at last connecting the north of Scotland with the growing network further south. Interests in Aberdeen contemplated building a railway from Aberdeen to Inverness: it would have been called the Great North of Scotland, but the idea failed to attract tangible support, and it was dropped.

In March 1845 the idea was revived, once again under the name the Great North of Scotland Railway (GNoSR). It would connect Aberdeen and Inverness; many held the view that the line should follow the north coast so as to serve the numerous fishing villages there, but a set of branch lines, as well as a completely independent coastal railway through Banff and Portsoy, were proposed instead.

There were rival schemes, and at the time Parliament held the view that too many railways would be a bad thing; in consequence it was the GNoSR inland proposal that was chosen, and authorised by the Great North of Scotland Railway Act 1846 (9 & 10 Vict. c. ciii) of 26 June 1846; the others were rejected. The financial crash that followed the Railway Mania made it obvious that the GNoSR would be unable to complete all of its intended network, and for the time being it planned only to build from Aberdeen to Huntly.

Banff, Portsoy and Strathisla Railway Act 1857
- Act of Parliament
- Parliament of the United Kingdom
- Long title: An Act for making a Railway from the Grange Station of the Great North of Scotland Railway to the Harbour of Banff, with a Branch to the Harbour of Portsoy.
- Citation: 20 & 21 Vict. c. liii

Dates
- Royal assent: 27 July 1857

Text of statute as originally enacted

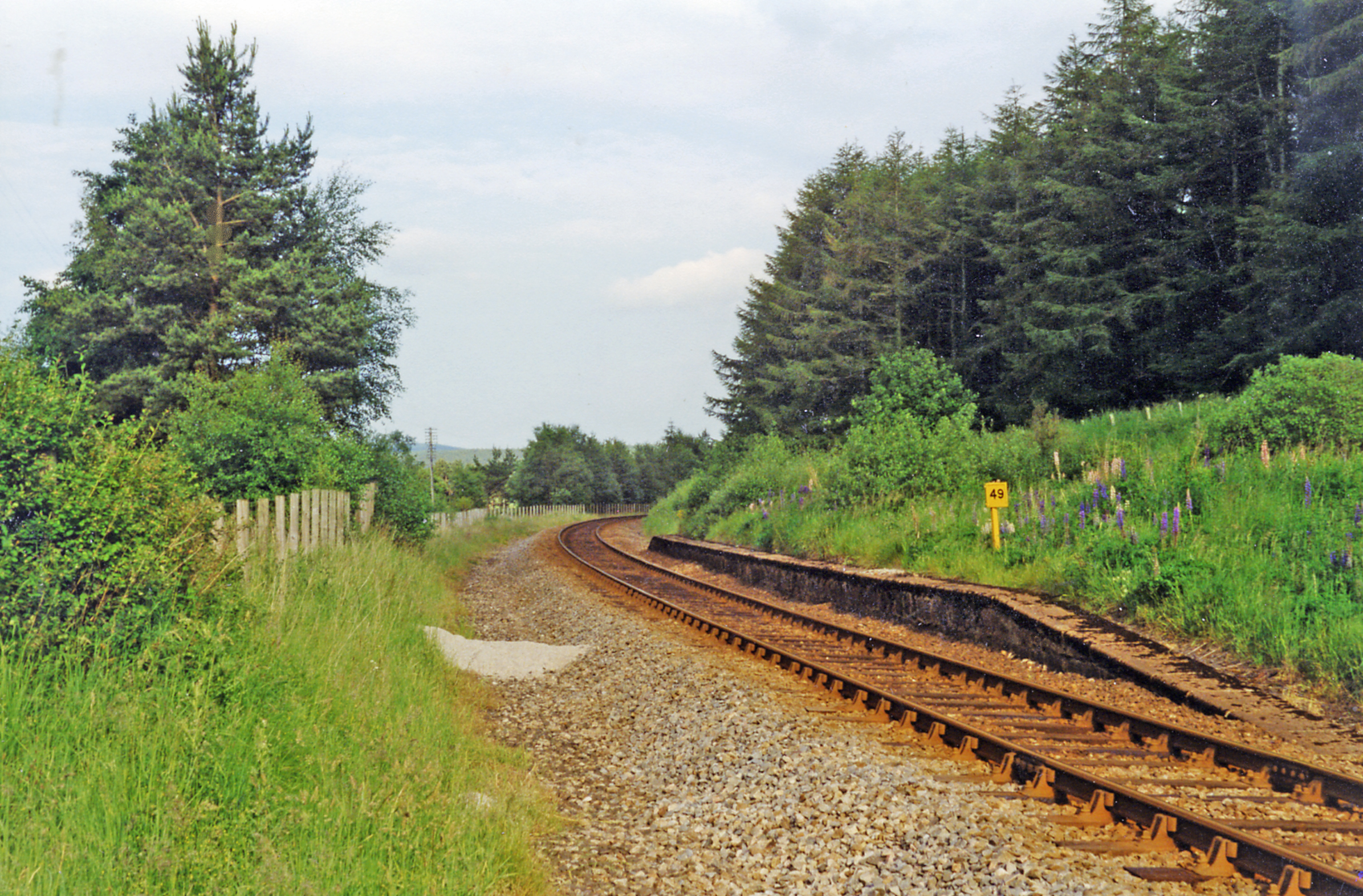
The former Grange station in 1997

There was still considerable local support for connecting some of the coastal settlements into the railway network, and as the money market returned to normal, energetic local interests succeeded in getting a company authorised: this was the Banff, Portsoy and Strathisla Railway, authorised by the Banff, Portsoy and Strathisla Railway Act 1857 (20 & 21 Vict. c. liii) of 27 July 1857, to construct a 16-mile (26 km) line from Grange station, on the main line of the GNoSR, to the harbour at Banff and a 3 1/4-mile (5 km) branch from the Banff line to a harbour at Portsoy. (Note: Grange is not the name of a community, but of an estate about 5 miles (8 km) east of Keith. The River Isla rises not far south-west of Keith and runs east alongside the GNoSR main line until it joins the River Deveron near Ruthven. Strathisla is the valley through which it runs, and the name refers to the general area around Keith, and denotes the area of Grange.) Authorised capital was £90,000.

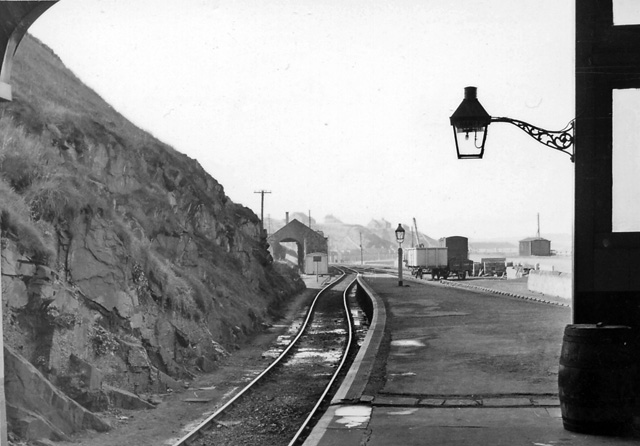
Banff railway station in 1961

By this time the GNoSR had opened its line from Aberdeen to Huntly, and extended as far as Keith, and the Inverness and Aberdeen Junction Railway (I&AJR) was building its line from Inverness, with the intention of reaching Keith; it did so in 1858. Although the GNoSR and the I&AJR needed to work co-operatively to make a success of the trunk route, there was considerable friction between them, and for some years through passengers needed to change trains at Keith.

The headquarters of the company were in Banff, and most of the directors were local landowners and business people, but the chairman was the Hon Thomas Bruce, the deputy chairman of the Inverness and Aberdeen Junction Railway. The contractors were B & E Blyth of Edinburgh, and construction was supervised by their resident engineer, William Keir. Heavy earthworks were avoided in the planning of the line by accepting steep gradients; the ruling gradient was 1 in 70 for a long distance approaching the Glenbarry summit. Train movements approaching Portsoy Harbour had to negotiate a 1 in 30 descent from the passenger terminus, an extreme gradient requiring special precautions.

== Opening and first operation ==
The line was opened throughout on 30 July 1859, but there was a derailment on opening day, limiting train operation to a single journey. A full service was begun on 2 August. Stations on the line were at Grange, on the GNoSR and managed jointly, Knock, Cornhill, Tillynaught and Ladysbridge, with the terminus at Banff Harbour and at Portsoy.

There were also request stopping places at Millegan, Barry and Ordens. At Grange the branch trains did not run through to and from the GNoSR main line: onward passengers had to change trains. The junction there faced towards Keith. At first, there were three trains daily between Grange and Banff, with connecting trains between Tillynaught and Portsoy. At the time Portsoy was a flourishing and important port town. In addition there were two daily trips between Banff and Portsoy, reversing at Tillynaught.

There is reason to believe that the management of the line was poor: Grant is blunt:

"The line was grossly mismanaged from the start, poor track laying resulting in the first train derailing, with its carriages, down a bank."

== Rolling stock ==
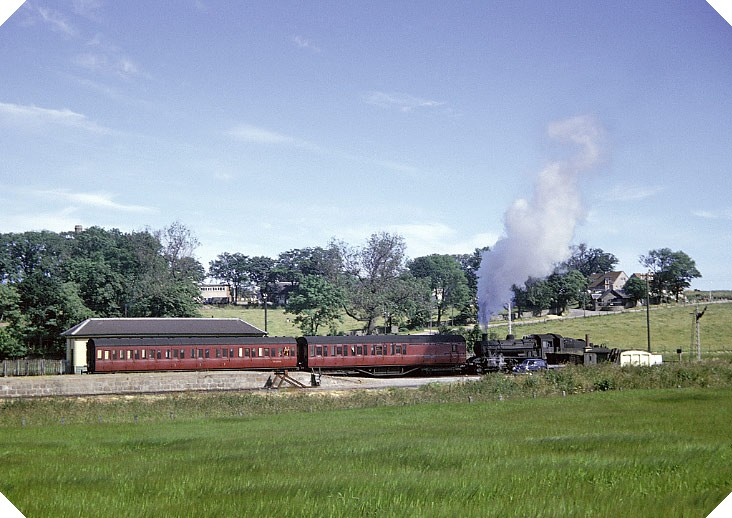
Locomotive 78045 at Ladysbridge July 1964. The station buildings served as sportsground changing rooms for many years

As well as being responsible for the construction of the line, Benjamin Blyth was responsible for procuring the locomotives and rolling stock. In February 1859 two side tank engines were ordered from Hawthorn's of Leith but they were not ready until September, and for the opening of the line two engines had to be hired in from the Inverness and Aberdeen Junction Railway. During subsequent operation there were delays and cancellations due to non-availability of locomotives. Two further locomotives were ordered from Hawthorn's. The railway still had problems and at the end of 1862 it was agreed that the GNoSR should take over the working of the line from the beginning of February 1863. The four locomotives were taken into GNoSR stock as numbers 37–40 in August 1863.

The first two engines was 0-4-2 tanks and were named Banff and Portsoy. The third and fourth engines were 0-4-2 tender engines named Strathisla and Keith. The early coaches employed were four-wheeled non corridor vehicles, although later six-wheeled and much later bogie carriages were used. Orders for carriages were placed with Brown, Marshalls and Co. Ltd. of Birmingham and Messrs Wright of Birmingham supplied the wagons.

== Finances ==
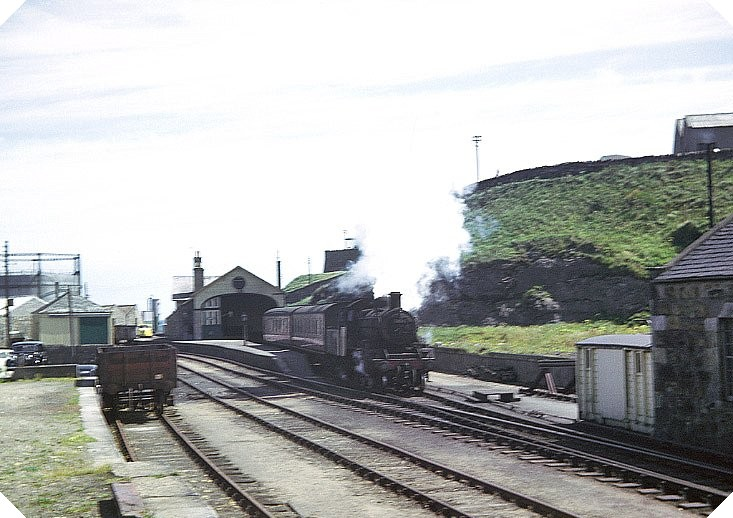
78045 leaving Banff with the 12.30 to Tillynaught; June 1964.

There had been considerable difficulty in attracting subscriptions for shares; the authorised capital was £90,000 but only £48,000 was actually subscribed. At the end of the first year, shareholders were told that the passenger business had exceeded expectations, and "that the receipts were ample to meet the working expenses, but not to cover the whole of the interest charges". Nevertheless, a dividend of 2% was declared. (Note: This was an extremely difficult situation; it was expected that income would exceed working expenses – an operating profit – but there needed to be a significant surplus to pay the interest on loans and to pay off some of the principal. Paying a dividend in that situation may be regarded as irresponsible.)

== Takeover by the Great North of Scotland Railway ==
The desperate financial situation could hardly be allowed to continue, and in 1863 the GNoSR agreed to work the line. From 1 February 1863 it would do so for 60% of receipts, reducing to 50% if receipts reached £7 per mile per week. The arrangement was ratified by the Banffshire Railway Act 1863 (26 & 27 Vict. c. clxx) of 21 July 1863; the opportunity was taken to rename the company to the Banffshire Railway Company. The directors continued in optimism, as the act of Parliament also authorised the company to build from Portsoy westward along the coast to Portgordon, about 14 miles (23 km). Additional capital of £100,000 was permitted, and the GNoSR could subscribe £80,000.

Before that could be contemplated, the operational financial crisis continued, as the profit margin on operations was still not enough to service interest charges on bank loans.

In January 1864, the deputy chairman of the Banffshire Railway wrote to the GNoSR board to state that "through dint of great perseverance" the Banffshire directors had raised guarantees of £20,000 towards construction of the coastal line west from Portsoy, though to go only as far as Buckie. Urging the GNoSR to make a start on the promised construction, the Banffshire bemoaned the fact that traffic was going from the coast on a carrier's carts to the Inverness and Aberdeen Junction Railway station at Fochabers. The GNoSR had its own financial problems, and was mightily sceptical about the Buckie extension (as it had become) and delayed taking action.

The extension to Buckie was not started, but in 1865 the Banffshire Directors cheerfully reported that "the line continues to be satisfactorily worked by the Great North of Scotland Railway".

The Great North of Scotland Railway (Amalgamation) Act 1866 (29 & 30 Vict. c. cclxxxviii) dated 30 July 1866 allowed extension of the time for the construction of the line to Portgordon by one year, but significantly also granted optional powers for amalgamation with the Great North of Scotland Railway. The Banffshire Railway activated the powers to become absorbed by the GNoSR, and this was ratified by the Great North of Scotland Railway (Further Powers) Act 1867 (30 & 31 Vict. c. cxc) of 12 August 1867. This also authorised the abandonment of the Portgordon line.

== Coast line revived ==
Portsoy railways after the opening of the coast line

Although the Banffshire Railway and the GNoSR did not construct the planned coast line running west from Portsoy and serving the numerous fishing settlements, the idea continued to interest the GNoSR. On 12 July 1882 the GNoSR got the Great North of Scotland (Buckie Extension) Railway Act 1882 (45 & 46 Vict. c. cxxvi) for the construction of the line, through to Elgin, which had long been a key objective for the company. The line opened in stages from 1884, and fully on 1 May 1886.

== Grange curve ==
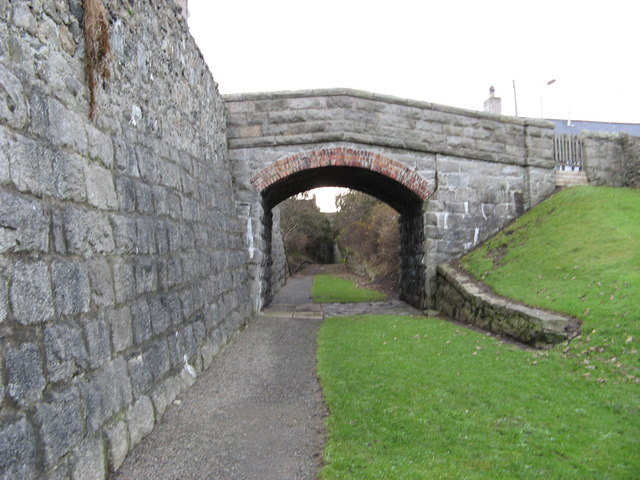
The course of the Portsoy Harbour line north of the passenger station, in 2006

The junction at Grange was built facing west, towards Keith. To allow trains to run directly from Aberdeen on to the coast line, a connection to the Banff Branch was laid on land given by the Duke of Richmond, completing a triangle between Grange, Grange South, and Grange North Junctions, opening on 3 May 1886. Parliamentary authorisation was given retrospectively in the Great North of Scotland Railway (Further Powers) Act 1887 (50 & 51 Vict. c. cxxxviii) of 19 July 1887, in order that charges for its use could be legally made.

== Cairnie junction station ==
On 1 June 1898 an exchange platform called Cairnie Junction came into use at Grange South Junction; the exchange platform enabled trains on the Keith and Banff lines to exchange passengers here rather than at Huntly: the island platform had no public road access until 1965.

== Closures ==
In the spring of 1910 the rails of the Portsoy harbour branch, unused for around 25 years, were lifted. The construction of extended harbours at Buckie and Macduff, able to take the larger steam powered boats of the 1890s had rendered Portsoy's cramped harbour useless.

The emphasis for access to the Banff and Portsoy lines had shifted to the east, and Grange West curve, part of the original line, was closed on 7 May 1960. The original route from Tillynaught to Banff closed to passengers on 6 July 1964. The section from Grange to Tillynaught fed the coast line, and therefore remained open until both sections closed on 6 May 1968.

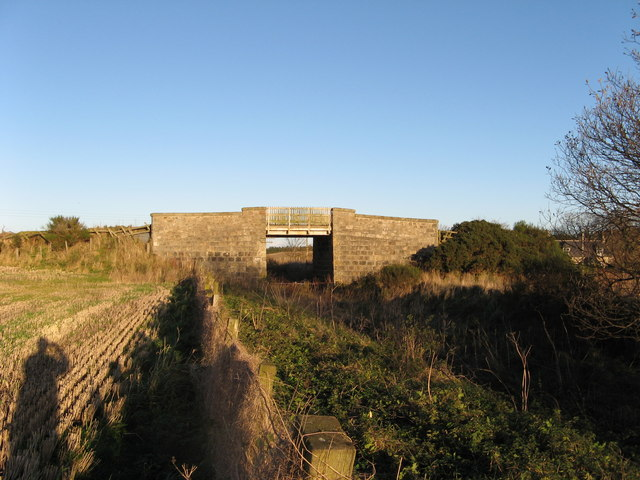
Disused track near Tillynaught.

This line was the last steam operated line in the north east of Scotland.

== Current use ==
Parts of the old line are suitable for walkers. Most of the stations and other buildings have disappeared, though a few of the latter have become private residences.

== Locations ==
=== Main line ===
- Portsoy Harbour;
- Portsoy; opened 30 July 1859; re-sited when line extended 1 April 1884; closed 6 May 1968;
- Tillynaught; opened 1 September 1859; closed 6 May 1968;
- Cornhill; opened 30 July 1859; closed 6 May 1968;
- Barry; opened 1 October 1859; renamed Glenbarry 19 February 1872; closed 6 May 1968;
- Knock; opened 30 July 1859; closed 1 July 1875; reopened 1 September 1875; closed 6 May 1968;
- Millegan; opened 1 October 1859; closed 4 November 1867;
- Grange; GNoSR station; opened 5 January 1857; closed 6 May 1968.

=== Banff branch ===
- Banff; opened 30 July 1859, temporary terminus probably near later Golf Club House; replaced by permanent terminus called Banff Harbour 12 April 1860; renamed Banff 1928; closed 6 July 1964;
- Golf Club House; opened 1 October 1913; closed 6 July 1964;
- Bridgefoot Halt; opened 1 October 1913; closed 6 July 1964;
- Ladys Bridge; opened 1 October 1859; renamed Ladysbridge 1886; closed 6 July 1964;
- Ordens; opened 1 October 1859; closed 6 July 1964; probably not open continuously;
- Tillynaught; above.

=== Cairnie Junction ===
- Cairnie Junction; opened 1 June 1898 for exchange only, advertised as public station 14 June 1965; closed 6 May 1968.
