= Lethenty railway station =

Disused railway station in Scotland

Lethenty
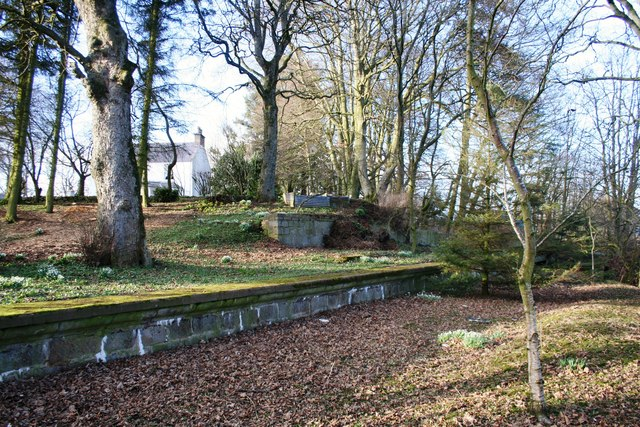

General information
- Location: Lethenty, Aberdeenshire; Scotland
- Coordinates: 57.311°N 2.383°W
- Grid reference: NJ 769 245
- Platforms: 1

Other information
- Status: Disused

History
- Original company: Inverury and Old Meldrum Junction Railway
- Pre-grouping: Great North of Scotland Railway

Key dates
- 1 October 1856: opened to passengers
- 6 July 1856: opened for goods
- 2 November 1931: closed for passengers
- 6 February 1961: station closed for freight
- 1966: line closed completely
Location

Lethenty railway station was a railway station in Lethenty, Aberdeenshire, on the rural branch line from Inverurie to Old Meldrum.

== History ==
The railway station opened on 26 June 1856 or 1 October 1856. and closed to passengers on 2 November 1931.

The station continued to be used for freight traffic until closure on 6 February 1961.

The station lay 2.25 miles (3.62 km) from Inverurie. In the early 20th century, the station and the platform were rebuilt using stone for the latter and wood for the former. It had a single siding that lay beyond the level crossing that served the Lethenty meal mill via a waggon turntable.

The station lay at 195 feet (59 m) above sea level on a section of single track. For down trains, the line presented a steady but not severe climb towards Fingask at 244 feet (74 m) and Oldmeldrum at 264 feet (80 m). No signals or passing loop were present.

Lethenty had facilities for parcels, freight, horseboxes, and livestock. It had no crane and did not serve private carriages or furniture vans. The staff originally consisted of a stationmaster and porter. In 1915 milk churns, parcels and freight traffic were quite regular.

The platform survives; however, the station building has been demolished. A railway cottage still stands nearby.

== Previous services ==
All trains stopped at Lethenty, unlike the service at Fingask. The line had no Sunday service. Tickets were issued from Lethenty in 1937 and 1938 despite the 1931 closure. These may represent tickets for onward travel from Inverurie issued while the station was still staffed, or they may relate to passengers travelling in the freight train goods van permitted at the time. The last railtour to visit the line was in June 1965 with a two car DMU.

Preceding station	Historical railways	Following station
Inverurie; Line closed; Station open	Great North of Scotland Railway; Inverury and Old Meldrum Junction Railway	Fingask; Line and Station closed
