= Gartly railway station =

Disused railway station in Gartly, Aberdeenshire

Gartly
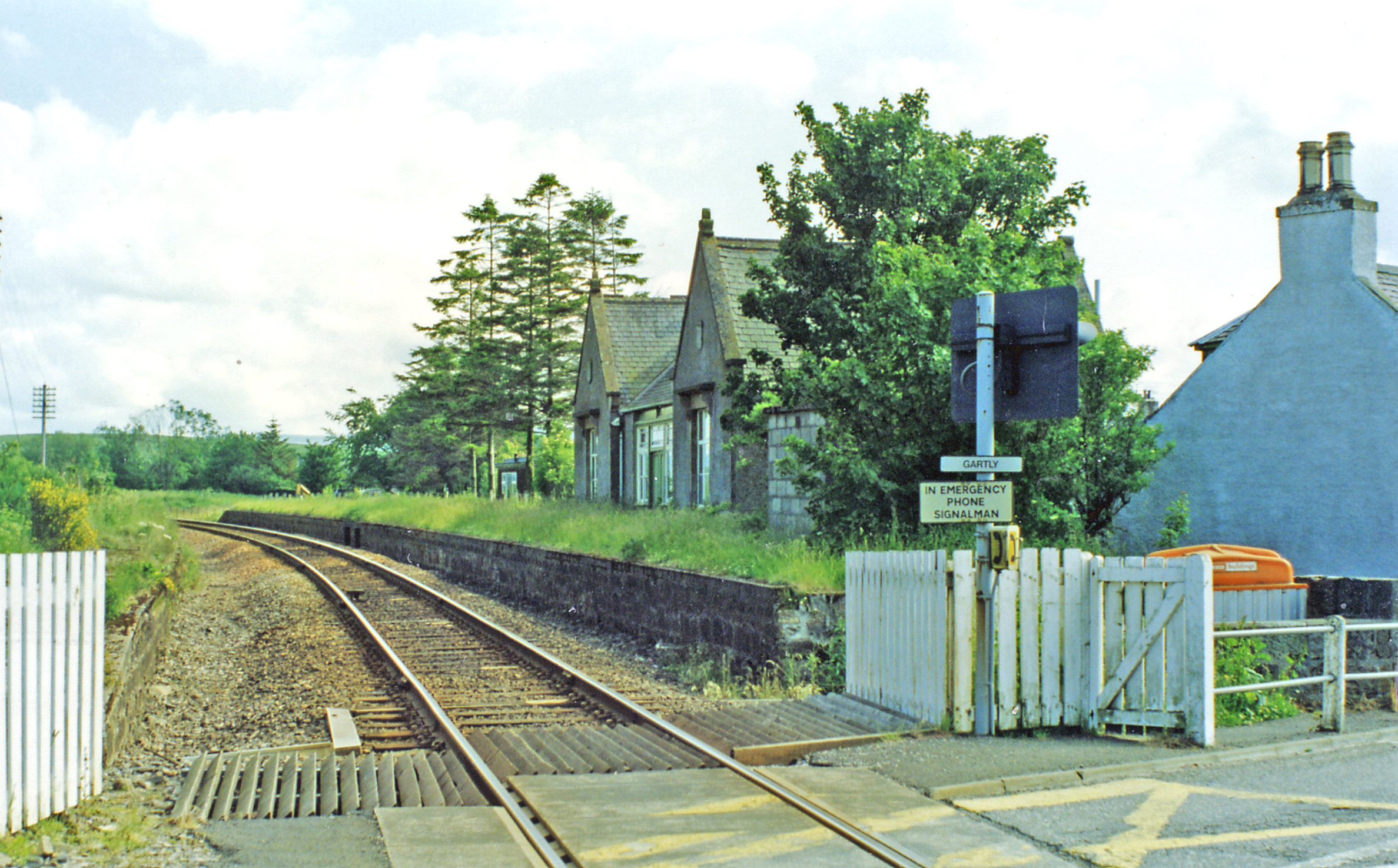
- The remains of the station in 1997

General information
- Location: Gartly, Aberdeenshire; Scotland
- Coordinates: 57.379°N 2.7958°W
- Grid reference: N522323
- Platforms: 2

Other information
- Status: Disused

History
- Original company: Great North of Scotland Railway
- Pre-grouping: Great North of Scotland Railway
- Post-grouping: LNER

Key dates
- 20 September 1854: Opened
- 6 May 1968: Closed
Location

Gartly railway station served the hamlet of Gartly, Aberdeenshire, Scotland from 1854 to 1968 on the Great North of Scotland Railway.

== History ==
The station opened on 20 September 1854 by the Great North of Scotland Railway. It was also known as Gartly for Lumsden and Strathdon station. It closed to both passengers and goods traffic on 6 May 1968.

The station building is now a private residence.

Preceding station	Historical railways	Following station
Kennethmont; Line open, station closed	Great North of Scotland Railway	Huntly; Line and station open
