= Great North of Scotland Railway =

Former Scottish railway company

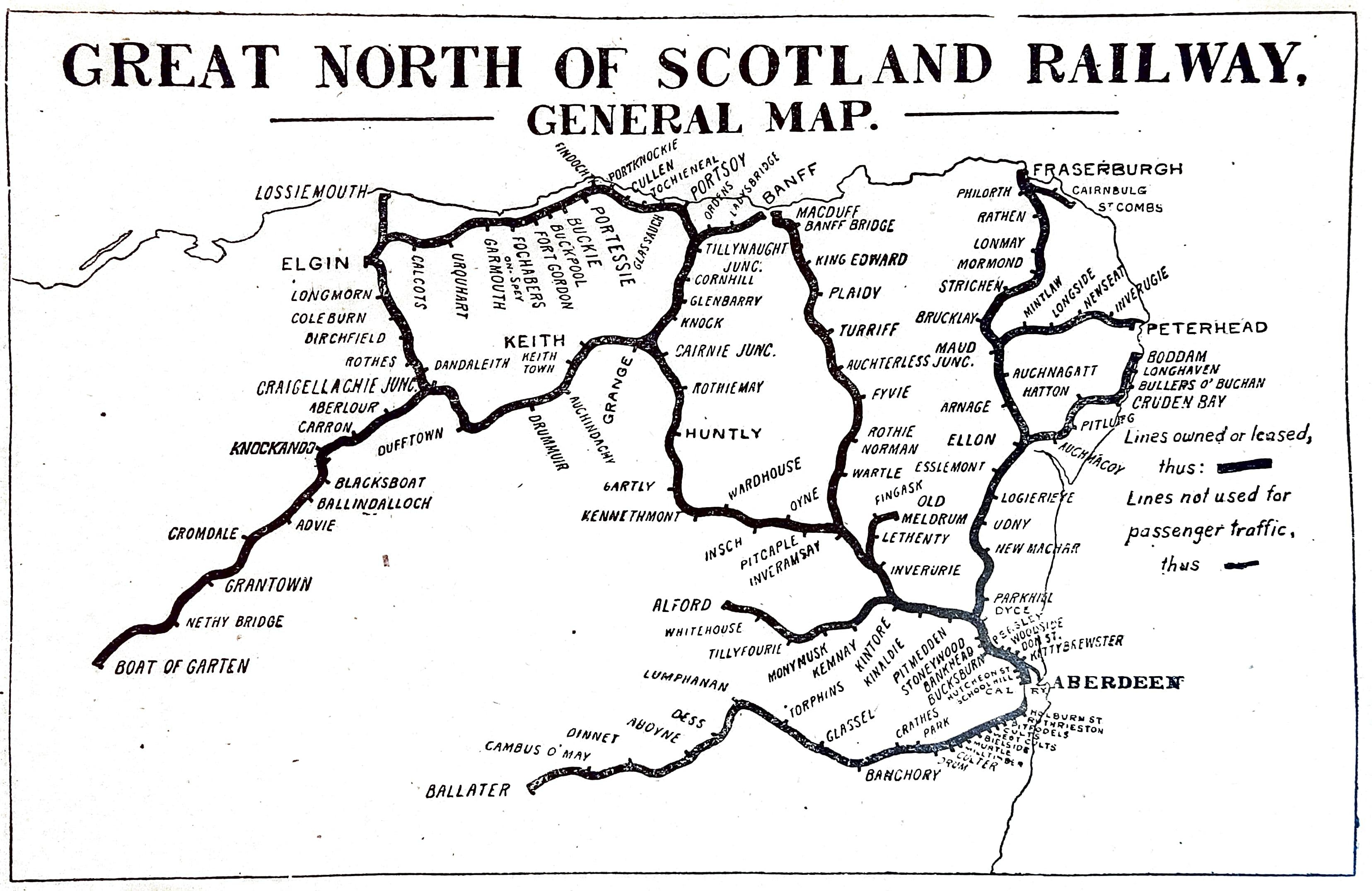
- 1920 map of the railway

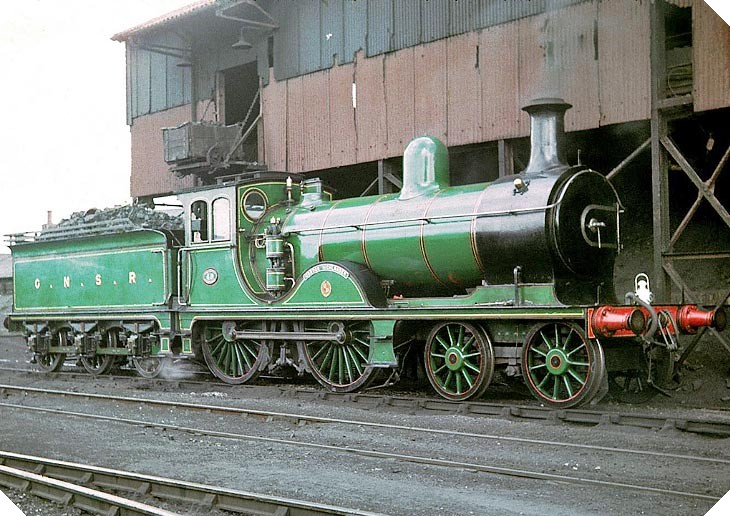
- No. 49 Gordon Highlander, seen here in 1964 after preservation.

Overview
- Headquarters: Aberdeen
- Dates of operation: 1854–1922
- Successor: London and North Eastern Railway

Technical
- Track gauge: 4 ft 8 1/2 in (1,435 mm) standard gauge
- Length: 334 miles 40 chains (538.3 km) (1919)
- Track length: 524 miles 1 chain (843.3 km) (1919)

The Great North of Scotland Railway (GNSR) was one of the two smallest of the five major Scottish railway companies prior to the 1923 Grouping, operating in the north-east of the country. Formed in 1845, it carried its first passengers the 39 miles (63 km) from Kittybrewster, in Aberdeen, to Huntly on 20 September 1854. By 1867 it owned 226 1/4 route miles (364.1 km) of line and operated over a further 61 miles (98 km).

The early expansion was followed by a period of forced economy, but in the 1880s the railway was refurbished, express services began to run and by the end of that decade there was a suburban service in Aberdeen. The railway operated its main line between Aberdeen and Keith and two routes west to Elgin, connections could be made at both Keith and Elgin for Highland Railway services to Inverness. There were other junctions with the Highland Railway at Boat of Garten and Portessie, and at Aberdeen connections for journeys south over the Caledonian and North British Railways. Its eventual area encompassed the three Scottish counties of Aberdeenshire, Banffshire and Moray, with short lengths of line in Inverness-shire and Kincardineshire.

Fish from the North Sea ports and whisky from the distilleries of Speyside became important goods traffic. The Royal Family used the Deeside Line for travel to and from Balmoral Castle and when they were in residence a daily special 'Messenger Train' ran from Aberdeen; for most of the railway's life this was its only Sunday service. The company ran three hotels, and a network of feeder bus services was developed in the early 20th century. In 1923, it became part of the London and North Eastern Railway as its Northern Scottish area, passing on 333 1/2 miles (536.7 km) of line and 122 steam locomotives, most of them 4-4-0 tender locomotives. The railway had several branches, but only its main line remains today as part of the Aberdeen to Inverness Line.

== History ==
=== Half way to Inverness, 1845–1858 ===
==== Establishment and construction ====
Great North of Scotland Railway Act 1846
- Act of Parliament
- Parliament of the United Kingdom
- Long title: An Act for making a Railway from Aberdeen to Inverness, with Branches to Banff, Portsoy, Garmouth, and Burghead, to be called "The Great North of Scotland Railway."
- Citation: 9 & 10 Vict. c. ciii

Dates
- Royal assent: 26 June 1846
Other legislation
Repealed by	Great North of Scotland Railway Consolidation Act 1859

Status: Repealed

In 1845 the Great North of Scotland Railway was formed to build a railway from Aberdeen to Inverness. The proposed 108 1/4-mile (174.2 km) route, which needed few major engineering works, followed the River Don to Inverurie, via Huntly and Keith to a crossing of the River Spey, and then to Elgin and along the coast via Nairn to Inverness. Branch lines to Banff, Portsoy, Garmouth and Burghead would total 30 1/2 miles (49.1 km). At the same time the Perth and Inverness Railway proposed a direct route over the Grampian Mountains to Perth, and the Aberdeen, Banff and Elgin Railway suggested a route that followed the coast to better serve the Banffshire and Morayshire fishing ports. Three private bills were presented to Parliament seeking permission to build a railway, but the Aberdeen, Banff and Elgin failed to raise funds, and the Perth and Inverness Railway was rejected because the railway would be at altitudes that approached 1,500 feet (460 m) and needed steep gradients. The Great North of Scotland Railway Act 1846 (9 & 10 Vict. c. ciii) received royal assent on 26 June 1846.

In the aftermath of the railway mania railway companies became an unpopular investment and the necessary finance could not be raised. The company suggested at a meeting in November 1849 that whereas £650,000 was needed for a double-track railway from Aberdeen to Inverness, only £375,000 would be needed for a single-track railway from Kittybrewster, 1 1/2 miles (2.4 km) from Aberdeen, to Keith, halfway to Inverness. The meeting recommended that the bridges and works be built wide enough for a second track when this was needed. Construction eventually began in November 1852, albeit to Huntly, 12 1/2 miles (20.1 km) short of Keith, with William Cubitt as engineer. The severe winter the following year delayed work. Between Inverurie and Aberdeen the line took over the Aberdeenshire Canal, the purchase of which delayed construction as it was necessary to settle the claims of each shareholder individually.

==== Opening ====
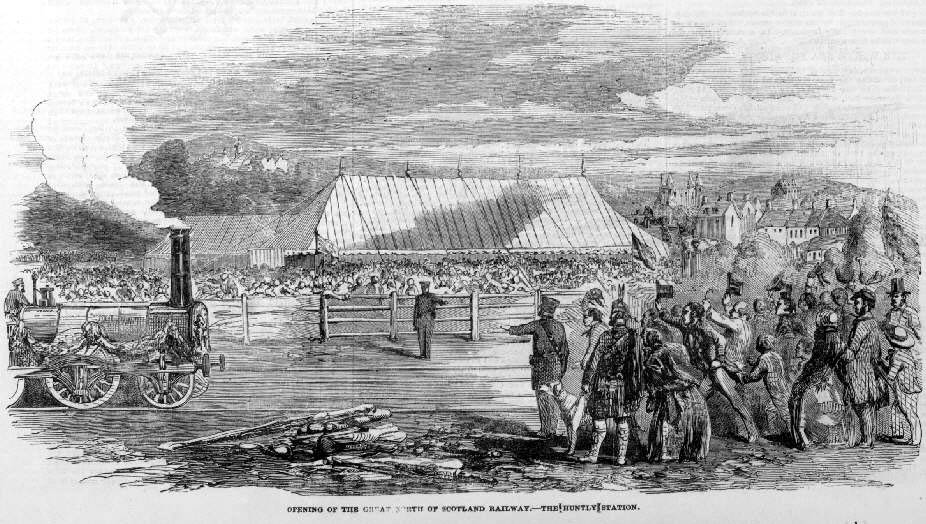
The reception at Huntly for the official opening train

After an inspection by the Board of Trade, the railway opened to goods on 12 September 1854 and approval for the carriage of passengers was given two days later. The railway was officially opened on 19 September, and two locomotives hauling twenty-five carriages carrying 400 passengers left Kittybrewster at 11 am. The number of passengers had grown to about 650 by the time the train arrived to a celebration at Huntly at 1:12 pm. Public services began the following day.

There were stations at:

- Kittybrewster
- Buxburn (Bucksburn after 1897)
- Dyce
- Kinaldie (open after 1 December)
- Kintore
- Inverury (Inverurie after 1866)
- Pitcaple
- Oyne
- Buchanstone (open after 1 December)
- Insch
- Wardhouse (open after 1 December)
- Kennethmont
- Gartly
- Huntly

The railway was single track with passing loops at the termini and at Kintore, Inverurie and Insch; the loop at Kittybrewster was clear of the platform to allow the locomotive to run round the carriages and push them into the station. A daily goods train took up to 3 hours 40 minutes for the 39 miles (63 km), the goods to Aberdeen also carried passengers and mail and spared cattle a two-day drive to market. Initially there were three passenger services a day taking two hours, fares being 1 3/4 old pence (d) a mile for first class and 1 1/4d for third; on one train a day in each direction it was possible to travel for the statutory fare of 1d a mile. (Note: The pre-decimal penny was worth in 1854 about the same as 40p in 2025.) Although cheaper than travelling by coach, (Note: The coach fare between Huntly and Aberdeen was 8 shillings (s), 13s if travelling inside.) these fares and the charges for the transport of goods were considered high but not reduced for thirty years.

The railway opened short of rolling stock as only half of the twelve locomotives and twenty-four of forty passenger carriages ordered had arrived. The carriage builders, Brown, Marshall & Co of Birmingham, stated that based on their experience they had expected the line to open at least two months late. The third day after opening to passengers, on 23 September, there was a collision between two trains at Kittybrewster that resulted in the death of a passenger and several serious injuries. The inquiry found that the driver, attempting to make up time after a late start, had over-run previous stations and been approaching the terminus with excessive speed. The driver attempted to select reverse gear to slow the train but had failed to hold on to the lever, which slipped into forward, propelling the train into carriages waiting at the platform. The report also criticised the station staff, who should not have allowed the carriages to be waiting at the station. The layout at Kittybrewster was altered after the accident.

==== Waterloo, Keith and Inverness ====
The Great North of Scotland and Inverness and Aberdeen Junction Railway route between Aberdeen and Inverness that opened in August 1858

The Aberdeen Railway (AR) opened from the south to Ferryhill, south of Aberdeen, in April 1850. It had been previously arranged that the Aberdeen and Great North would amalgamate, but this was annulled that year and the Aberdeen was seeking alliances with railways to the south. In 1854 the AR opened its Guild Street terminus in Aberdeen and the Great North sought and obtained powers for a 1 3/4-mile (2.8 km) branch that followed the Aberdeenshire Canal from Kittybrewster to a terminus at Waterloo by the docks. The line was opened to goods traffic on 24 September 1855 and passengers on 1 April 1856. Kittybrewster station was rebuilt with through platforms and the offices moved to Waterloo station from premises at 75 Union Street. The stations were 1/2 mile (800 m) apart and a goods line was built though the docks linking the two railways, worked by horses as steam locomotives were prohibited.

The Inverness and Nairn Railway was authorised by the Inverness and Nairn Railway Act 1854 (17 & 18 Vict. c. clxxvi) to build a railway from Inverness to Nairn. The Great North, still seeking to reach Inverness, had objected but withdrew after running rights over the railway were promised. The 15-mile (24 km) line was opened on 6 November 1855, and the Inverness and Elgin Junction Railway was formed to extend this line to Elgin. The Great North objected again, this time citing the expense of crossing the Spey, but withdrew after it was suggested that the cost of a bridge would be shared. The new company changed its name to Inverness and Aberdeen Junction Railway, but no final undertaking on running rights was made.

Great North of Scotland Railway Extension Act 1855
- Act of Parliament
- Parliament of the United Kingdom
- Long title: An Act to extend the Great North of Scotland Railway from Huntly to Keith.
- Citation: 18 & 19 Vict. c. xxviii

Dates
- Royal assent: 25 May 1855
Other legislation
Repealed by	Great North of Scotland Railway Consolidation Act 1859

Status: Repealed

Text of statute as originally enacted

The 12 1/2-mile (20.1 km) extension of the Great North to Keith, authorised by the Great North of Scotland Railway Extension Act 1855 (18 & 19 Vict. c. xxviii) was opened on 10 October 1856, with two intermediate stations at Rothiemay and Grange. Initially five services a day ran between Aberdeen and Keith, taking between 2 hours 40 minutes and 3 hours 5 minutes, although the number of services was later reduced to four. The route between Nairn and Keith authorised by the Inverness and Aberdeen Junction Railway Act 1856 (19 & 20 Vict. c. cx) on 21 July 1856 required less earthwork, reducing cost, but had steeper gradients than had originally been proposed, and the Great North contributed £40,000 towards a bridge over the Spey. The line reached Dalvey (near Forres) in 1857, and Keith on 18 August 1858. Three services a day ran the 108 1/2 miles (174.6 km) between Aberdeen and Inverness, increasing to five a day east of Keith, and the journey to Inverness took between 5 hours and 55 minutes and 6 hours 30 minutes. (Note: As the Spey Bridge was unfinished when the line opened, passengers disembarked and walked across the adjacent road bridge. The locomotive was detached and crossed before the carriages were hauled over by ropes.) The Great North did not insist on running rights west of Keith, but through carriages were probably provided from the start. (Note: Timetables of the time did not differentiate clearly between through and connecting trains.)

=== Expansion, 1854–1866 ===
==== Formartine and Buchan Railway ====
Permission to build a line to serve the fishing ports at Peterhead and Fraserburgh was received in 1846, but this lapsed during the financial collapse that had followed. Two rival bills were presented in 1856, one by the Formartine and Buchan Railway and backed by the Great North, and another by the Aberdeen, Peterhead and Fraserburgh Railway. Both companies failed to obtain permission for two years, but in 1858 the Formartine and Buchan Railway was successful. A 29-mile (47 km) long railway from Dyce to Old Deer (renamed Mintlaw in 1867) opened on 18 July 1861 and the main line between Kittybrewster and Dyce was doubled. The branch was extended the 9 miles (14 km) to a station at Peterhead the following year and a 16-mile (26 km) long branch north from Maud to Fraserburgh station opened on 24 April 1865. Three or four services a day ran between Aberdeen, Fraserburgh and Peterhead, with the trains dividing at Maud; travel times were between 2 1/2 and 2 3/4 hours. The railway was absorbed by the Great North of Scotland Railway on 1 August 1866.

==== Alford Valley Railway ====
The Alford Valley Railway left the main line at Kintore for Alford. The railway was authorised by the Alford Valley Railway Act 1856 (19 & 20 Vict. c. xl) with the backing of the Great North; most of the company's directors were also on the board of the Great North. The line was steeply graded over a summit at Tillyfourie, at between 1 in 70 and 1 in 75. The line opened in 1859 with a service of four trains a day calling at Kemnay, Monymusk and Whitehouse. In 1862 the Great North guaranteed the company's debts and it was subsequently absorbed by the Great North of Scotland Railway on 1 August 1866.

==== Inverury and Old Meldrum Junction Railway ====
The branch from Inverurie, backed by local residents with funding from the Great North, was authorised by the Inverury and Old Meldrum Junction Railway Act 1855 (18 & 19 Vict. c. lxv) on 15 June 1855. The official opening took place on 26 June 1856 with public services starting on 1 July. Journeys took from 18 to 20 minutes to cover the 5 3/4 miles (9.3 km) to Old Meldrum with a stop at Lethenty; a further station opened in 1866 at Fingask. In June 1858 the line was leased to the Great North for a rental of £650 per year (equivalent to £69,800 in 2025). The railway was absorbed by the Great North of Scotland Railway on 1 August 1866.

==== Banff, Macduff and Turriff Railways ====
Plans to reach fishing ports at Macduff and Banff from Inverurie were proposed when the Great North was first suggested, but failed because of the lack of financial support. A different route, from Milton Inveramsay, allowed for a shorter route with easier gradients. Unable to raise sufficient money for a line to the coast, a shorter 18-mile (29 km) line to Turriff was built. The Great North invested in the railway, and directors sat on the board of the Junction Railway. The new line, together with a junction station at Inveramsay, opened on 5 September 1857. A separate company, the Banff, Macduff and Turriff Extension Railway, built an extension to a station called Banff and Macduff. The line was operated by the Great North from 4 June 1860, and served an inconvenient terminus high on a hill 3/4 mile (1.2 km) from Macduff and 1/4 mile (400 m) from the bridge across the River Deveron to Banff. Four trains a day ran from Inveramsay, taking between 1 hour 30 minutes and 1 hour 50 minutes, with connections with services to Aberdeen. Both railways were absorbed by the Great North of Scotland Railway on 1 August 1866, and the line was extended 1/2 mile (800 m) to a new Macduff station in 1872.

==== Banff, Portsoy and Strathisla Railway ====
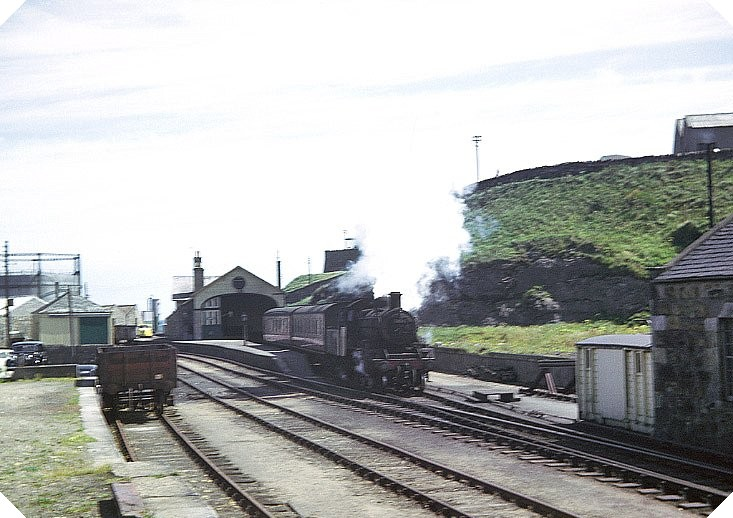
Banff station in 1964

The railway was authorised in 1857 from Grange, on the Great North main line, 16 1/4 miles (26.2 km) to Banff, with a 3 1/4-mile (5.2 km) branch from Tillynaught to Portsoy. The chairman of the company, Thomas Bruce, was also deputy chairman of the Inverness & Aberdeen Junction Railway, with the other directors being made up of local men; most of the investments were raised locally and in small amounts. Most of the line was built with gradients up to 1 in 70, but the half-mile of 1 in 30 goods line to the harbour at Portsoy was restricted to one locomotive and four wagons. The railway opened on 30 July 1859, with public services starting on 2 August following a derailment on the opening day. Services connected with the Great North at Grange. With the railway struggling to pay the interest on its debt, in 1863 the Great North took over running the services and the line renamed the Banffshire Railway. The Great North provided three trains a day between Grange and Banff that connected at Tillynaught for Portsoy, and two trains a day along the coast between Banff and Portsoy. Permission for a 14 1/4-mile (22.9 km) extension from Portsoy to Portgordon was given, but the necessary investment could not be found. Amalgamation with the Great North was authorised in 1866, but financial problems delayed this until 12 August 1867, and the Portgordon extension was abandoned.

==== Keith and Dufftown Railway ====
The Great North sought to have its own route west of Keith, with Grantown-on-Spey as an objective, where it hoped to meet any possible line between Perth and Inverness. To this end, it invested in the Keith and Dufftown Railway; this company was incorporated on 27 July 1857, but lack of money slowed progress. Powers for a longer, but cheaper, route between the two towns were secured on 25 May 1860. The revised route included steeper gradients than those planned in 1857; the maximum gradient was now 1 in 60 instead of 1 in 70. There was a viaduct over the Fiddich of two spans, and there were three intermediate stations: Earlsmill (renamed Keith Town in 1897), Botriphnie (renamed Auchindachy in 1862) and Drummuir. When the line opened on 21 February 1862, the trains were worked by the Great North under an agreement dating from the formation of the company. The railway was absorbed by the Great North of Scotland Railway on 1 August 1866.

==== Strathspey Railway ====
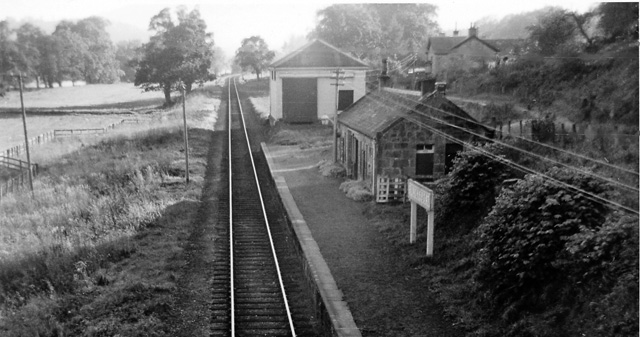
Blacksboat station in 1961

With promises of substantial goods traffic of iron and timber and from the local whisky distilleries, extension of the line to Dufftown into Strathspey was sought and obtained on 17 May 1861. The Strathspey Railway was sponsored by the Keith & Dufftown and Great North of Scotland railways, who appointed directors to the board, and the Great North undertook to run the services. The 32 1/2-mile (52.3 km) line first headed north to meet an extension of the Morayshire Railway at Strathspey Junction (called Craigellachie from 1864), before following the River Spey to Abernethy. The Strathspey Railway Act 1861 (24 & 25 Vict. c. xvi) also permitted a branch to the proposed Inverness and Perth Junction Railway at Grantown-on-Spey. The gradients were not severe, but the route required the Spey and its tributaries to be crossed many times, with three bridges built over the river itself. The line was placed in cuttings greater than 50 feet (15 m) deep, and there was one 68-yard (62 m) long tunnel. The line was opened on 1 July 1863 to Abernethy (later called Nethy Bridge). The line between Dufftown and Craigellachie became the main line and services continued over the Morayshire Railway, opening up a route between Keith and Elgin independent of the Inverness and Aberdeen Junction Railway (IAJR). The IAJR kept most of the through traffic as its line was more direct, only 18 miles (29 km) instead of 27 1/2 miles (44.3 km) via the Great North route. The Great North ran four trains a day from Elgin to Keith via Craigellachie, with through carriages or connections for three trains for Aberdeen at Keith. Connections at Elgin were poor because travel over the two routes took a different length of time.

The line from Craigellachie became a branch with three trains a day calling at all stations at an average speed of about 16 miles per hour (26 km/h). The link to Grantown-on-Spey was not built, but on 1 August 1866 services were extended to meet the IAJR (now the Highland Railway) at Boat of Garten. The railways met 3 miles (4.8 km) north of Boat and conflict arose over the manning of the signalbox at the junction, with the Highland refusing to make any contribution. For a while between March and June 1868 Great North services terminated at Nethy Bridge, after which separate tracks side by side were provided for both companies to Boat. Prompt connections were available with the Great North at Craigellachie, but there was usually a long wait for connections with the Highland at Boat. The railway was absorbed by the Great North of Scotland Railway on 1 August 1866, and the line's main source of income came from the local distilleries.

==== Morayshire Railway ====
A 16-mile (26 km) double-track railway had been proposed from Lossiemouth to Craigellachie in 1841 and necessary permissions granted in the Morayshire Railway Act 1846 (9 & 10 Vict. c. clxxviii), the route having changed to take advantage of the proposed Great North of Scotland Railway between Elgin and Orton. The financial situation delayed construction, but work eventually started on the section from Lossiemouth to Elgin in 1851. The 5 1/2-mile (8.9 km) line opened on 10 August 1852 with a special train from Elgin to festivities in Lossiemouth. Public services started the next day with five services a day, each taking 15 minutes with two request stops. First and second class accommodation was provided at 1 1/2d and 1d a mile. However, it was the Inverness and Aberdeen Junction Railway (IAJR) who was to build the line from Elgin to Orton; permission to build a branch from this line to Rothes was granted to the Morayshire in the Morayshire Railway (Extension) Act 1856 (19 & 20 Vict. c. lxxxvi) on 14 July 1856. The IAJR built its own station at Elgin, linked to the Morayshire's station by a junction to the east. The IAJR opened on 18 August 1858 and the Morayshire Railway started running services on 23 August.

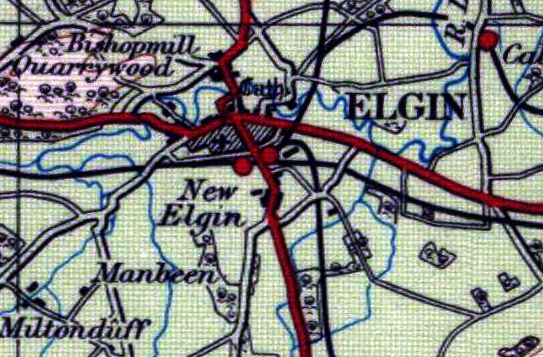
The Elgin railway stations on the 1923 OS map. The horizontal west–east line is the Inverness and Aberdeen Junction Railway. The Morayshire Railway lines north to Lossiemouth and south to Rothes used a separate station. The other line the east was built later by the Great North.

Initially the Morayshire ran trains over the IAJR, but its lightweight locomotives struggled with the gradients and proved unreliable, and after six weeks carriages were attached and detached from IAJR trains at Elgin and Orton. Conflict arose over through ticketing, and the directors of the Morayshire responded with plans to build its own line between the two stations. The Great North sponsored the new line and offered to provide services after the lines had been physically connected. Permission was granted on 3 July 1860, goods were carried from 30 December 1861 and passengers from 1 January 1862, reducing the travel time from 55 to 45 minutes. The Morayshire station at Elgin was enlarged in anticipation of Great North services, albeit in wood.

In 1861 permission was granted to the Morayshire Railway to cross the Spey and join with the Strathspey Railway at Craigellachie. The Morayshire extension and the Strathspey both opened on 1 July 1863 and the Great North provided a service of four trains a day over the line, which gave an alternative route between Keith and Elgin. On 30 July 1866 permission was given to the Morayshire and Great North to amalgamate with agreement, and the loss-making services between Orton and Rothes were withdrawn without notice the following day. (Note: Sources differ about whether the withdrawal of this service had been agreed between the two companies: Vallance (1991, p. 46) says that the Morayshire had agreed an annual payment in compensation, whereas Thomas & Turnock (1993, pp. 174–175) says that the Morayshire was so offended by the actions of the Great North that they considered merger with the Highland Railway.) It would be August 1881 before the Morayshire became fully part of the Great North.

==== Aberdeen joint station ====
The wooden station building at Waterloo was a 1/2-mile (800 m) from the Aberdeen and Deeside's Guild Street station and passengers were conveyed between the termini by omnibus, paid for in the through fare and with forty five minutes being allowed for the transfer. The Great North refused to hold its trains to connect with those arriving at Guild Street and insisted that tickets were purchased at least five minutes before the train was due to depart. The mail train would be held until the Post Office van had arrived and the mail was on board, but the station locked at the advertised departure time to prevent connecting passengers further delaying the train. This inconvenienced passengers, as was pointed out to the general manager during a parliamentary committee meeting by a member of parliament who had missed a connection, although his family and luggage had been sent on. The Great North promoted onward traffic by sea and approached the Aberdeen Steam Navigation Company to see if rates could be reduced for through traffic and through ticketing by rail was not available until 1859, when the Great North joined the Railway Clearing House.

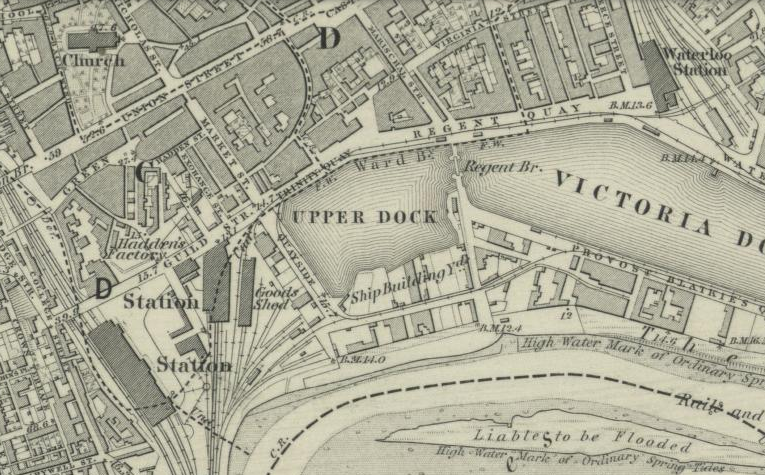
The Aberdeen stations in 1869. The Great North of Scotland Railway Waterloo terminus is top right, and the Aberdeen Railway Guild Street terminus bottom left, beside the new through Aberdeen joint railway station.

A joint line through the Denburn Valley to link the Great North to the south had been planned, and the Great North had approached the railways using the Guild Street station in 1853 and 1857 but were unhappy with the assistance that had been offered. Permission was granted in 1861 to the Inverness and Perth Junction Railway to build a line from Forres, on the Inverness and Aberdeen Junction Railway, direct to Perth. The Great North protested, and won the right for a booking office in Inverness. The line opened in 1863 and in 1865 the Inverness & Perth Junction and Inverness & Aberdeen Junction merged to become the Highland Railway. The Aberdeen Railway, which had now been absorbed by the Scottish North Eastern Railway (SNER), approached the Great North, concerned that the new line had bypassed Aberdeen, but no agreement was reached.

The Limpet Mill Scheme was a line presented in an 1862 bill by the nominally independent Scottish Northern Junction Railway, but supported by the SNER. This proposed a 22-mile (35 km) long railway between Limpet Mill, to the north of Stonehaven on the SNER, to the Great North at Kintore. A junction with the Deeside Railway was also planned, over which the SNER unsuccessfully tried to obtain running rights. Unpopular, this was given permission by Parliament, but the Great North succeeded in inserting a clause that this would be suspended if it obtained its own act of Parliament by 1 September 1863. The Great North proposed a route, known locally as the Circumbendibus, that was longer but cheaper than the direct route through the Denburn Valley. Despite local opposition, the route was approved by Parliament in the Great North of Scotland Railway (Aberdeen Junction) Act 1863 (26 & 27 Vict. c. clxiv), but was revoked the following year when the SNER obtained permission in the Denburn Valley Railway Act 1864 (27 & 28 Vict. c. cxi) for a railway through the Denburn Valley. The Great North contributed the £125,000 that its Circumbendibus line would have cost and the SNER contributed £70,000 out of the £90,000 it had been prepared to advance the Limpet Mill Scheme. The SNER built the double-track railway, culverting the Denburn and digging two short tunnels. The joint station opened on 4 November 1867 and consisted of three through tracks, one with a long platform, together with two bay platforms for terminating trains at either end. Two lines to the west were provided for goods traffic, and the stations at Waterloo and Guild Street closed to passengers and became goods terminals. The line to the north of the station passed to the Great North and the 269-yard (246 m) long Hutcheon Street tunnel became its longest.

==== Deeside Railway ====
A railway to serve Deeside was authorised on 16 July 1846, but it was decided to wait for the Aberdeen Railway to open first. The company survived after the railway mania as the Aberdeen Railway bought a large number of shares. Interest in the line was restored after Prince Albert purchased Balmoral Castle, to which the Royal Family made their first visit in 1848, and the Aberdeen Railway was able to sell its shares. Investors were still hard to find, but a 16 3/4-mile (27.0 km) line as far as Banchory was ceremonially opened on 7 September 1853; public services began the following day with three trains a day that took about an hour. First class accommodation was available for 1 1/2d a mile, reduced to 1d a mile for third class. Initially services were operated by the Aberdeen Railway to its terminus at Ferryhill, and the Deeside Railway used a horse to shunt wagons at Banchory. In 1854 the Deeside introduced its own rolling stock and ran through to the Aberdeen's Guild Street station which opened the same year.

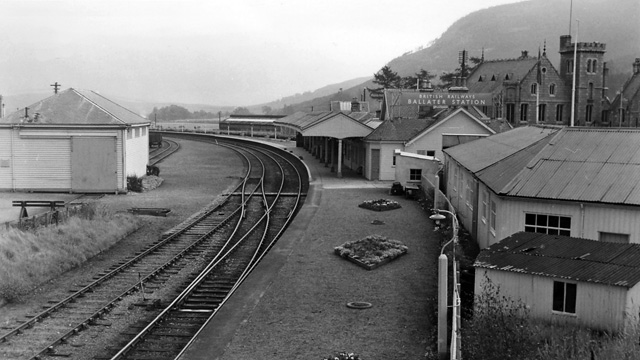
Ballater station, used by the Royal Family when they travelled to Balmoral, in 1966

A new company, the Aboyne Extension, was formed to reach Aboyne. Instead of building two bridges across the Dee, as had been proposed in 1846, the railway instead took a cheaper but 2-mile (3.2 km) longer route through Lumphanan, and services were extended over the new line on 2 December 1859. The Aboyne and Braemar Railway was formed by the Aboyne and Braemar Railway Act 1865 (28 & 29 Vict. c. cclxxix) to build a line from Aboyne the 28 miles (45 km) to Braemar. The line was to follow the Dee before crossing it 2 miles (3.2 km) from Braemar, but the plans were modified to terminate the line at Bridge of Gairn with the passenger terminus 1 1/2 miles (2.4 km) short at Ballater. This 12 1/2-mile (20.1 km) route opened to Ballater on 17 October 1866, and the line to Bridge of Gairn remained unfinished. By 1855 there five services a day over the 43 1/4-mile (69.6 km) long line, taking between 1 hour 50 minutes and 2 1/2 hours.

The Royal Family used the line from 1853 to travel to Balmoral Castle; in September 1866 the British Royal Train used Ballater station nearly a month before public services reached the station. At first Queen Victoria visited once a year, this becoming twice a year after Albert died in 1861. The number of visits returned to one a year after Edward VII became king in 1901. From 8 October 1865 a daily 'Messenger Train' ran when the Royal Family was at Balmoral. First class accommodation was available on these trains; accompanying servants were charged third class fares. In the late 1850s and early 1860s the Great North and the Scottish North Eastern Railway (SNER) were in conflict over the joint station in Aberdeen. Frustrated with lack of progress, the SNER proposed a new line that crossed the Deeside Railway. Whilst in discussions with the SNER about a link from this new line to the Deeside, a lease for the Deeside Railway was offered to the Great North, which was rapidly accepted. The Deeside board accepted the lease by a majority vote on 13 May 1862, and it was approved by Parliament in the Great North of Scotland Railway (Amalgamation) Act 1866 (29 & 30 Vict. c. cclxxxviii) on 30 July 1866. The Aboyne and Braemar Railway remained independent, although services were operated by the Great North of Scotland Railway.

==== Amalgamation ====
The Great North of Scotland Railway with other railways in 1867.

Great North of Scotland Railway (Amalgamation) Act 1866
- Act of Parliament
- Parliament of the United Kingdom
- Long title: An Act to provide for the Sale or Lease to the Great North of Scotland Railway Company of the Undertaking of various neighbouring Companies, or the Amalgamation of those Companies with the Great North of Scotland Railway Company; to authorize the Abandonment of the Extensions of the Banff, Macduff, and Turriff Extension Railway to Macduff; to extend the Time for making the Extension of the Banffshire Railway to Buckie; and for other Purposes.
- Citation: 29 & 30 Vict. c. cclxxxviii

Dates
- Royal assent: 30 July 1866

Text of statute as originally enacted

Great North of Scotland Railway (Further Powers) Act 1867
- Act of Parliament
- Parliament of the United Kingdom
- Long title: An Act to authorize the Amalgamation of the Banffshire Railway with the Great North of Scotland Railway, and the Abandonment of the Extension of the Banffshire Railway to Buckie; and for other Purposes.
- Citation: 30 & 31 Vict. c. cxc

Dates
- Royal assent: 12 August 1867

Text of statute as originally enacted

After opening to Keith in 1854 the Great North of Scotland Railway operated over 54 miles (87 km) of line. Ten years later this had almost quadrupled but more than three-quarters was over leased or subsidiary railways. Eventual amalgamation with many of these railways had been prompted from the start. The necessary authority was sought and on 30 July 1866 the Great North of Scotland Railway (Amalgamation) Act 1866 (29 & 30 Vict. c. cclxxxviii) received royal assent, this act also permitting the Great North to lease the Deeside Railway. The other companies merged two days later, except the Banffshire and Morayshire, which had started as separate undertakings and were not included in the 1866 act of Parliament, although permission for the Banffshire to merge was gained the following year in the Great North of Scotland Railway (Further Powers) Act 1867 (30 & 31 Vict. c. cxc). After the extension of the Deeside opened in 1866 and the merger of the Banffshire the following year the Great North of Scotland Railway owned 226 1/4 route miles (364.1 km) of line and operated over a further 61 miles (98 km).

=== Austerity, 1866–1879 ===
In 1855, the first full year after opening, the Great North of Scotland declared a dividend of 1 1/4 per cent, which rose to 4 1/4 the following year and 5 per cent in 1859. The dividend reached a maximum of 7 1/4 per cent in 1862 before dropping to 7 per cent the following year and 5 per cent in 1864, but in 1865 the directors could not pay any dividend on ordinary shares. At the directors' suggestion a committee was set up to look into their actions; the report's main recommendation was the abandonment of the Port Gordon extension. The opening of direct route over the Highland Railway to the south had lost the through mail business, resulting in the withdrawal of Sunday services, (Note: The only Sunday services to run on the Great North between 1884 and 1922 were the Messenger Trains on the Deeside Line.) and had lost revenue equivalent to a five per cent dividend. Joining the Clearing House system had resulted in the loss of twenty-five per cent of goods traffic income and the conflict over the joint station in Aberdeen had been expensive and resulted in an overpriced lease on the Deeside. The collapse of Overend, Gurney and Company Bank in 1866 meant that for three months the bank rate rose to 10 per cent, making the company's financial situation worse.

The whole board resigned and six members did not seek re-appointment. At the beginning of 1867 the company owed £800,000 (equivalent to £77,440,000 in 2025) and the new board imposed austerity measures. It would be 1874 before most of the company's debt was settled and it became possible to pay a dividend again. The only line built in the early 70s was the 1/2-mile (800 m) to Macduff and few carriages and no locomotives were built until 1876.

Great North of Scotland Railway (Further Powers) Act 1876
- Act of Parliament
- Parliament of the United Kingdom
- Long title: An Act to provide for the Amalgamation of the Deeside and Aboyne and Braemar Railway Companies with the Great North of Scotland Railway Company and for other purposes.
- Citation: 39 & 40 Vict. c. cxxiv

Dates
- Royal assent: 13 July 1876

Text of statute as originally enacted

The Deeside Railway and the Aboyne and Braemar Railway merged in July 1876,, both by the Great North of Scotland Railway (Further Powers) Act 1876 (39 & 40 Vict. c. cxxiv). The Morayshire Railway was absorbed in 1880. After an engine boiler exploded at Nethy Bridge in September 1878, the inquiry found the testing of boilers infrequent and inadequate. It was sixteen months before the locomotive was repaired.

=== Renaissance, 1879–1899 ===
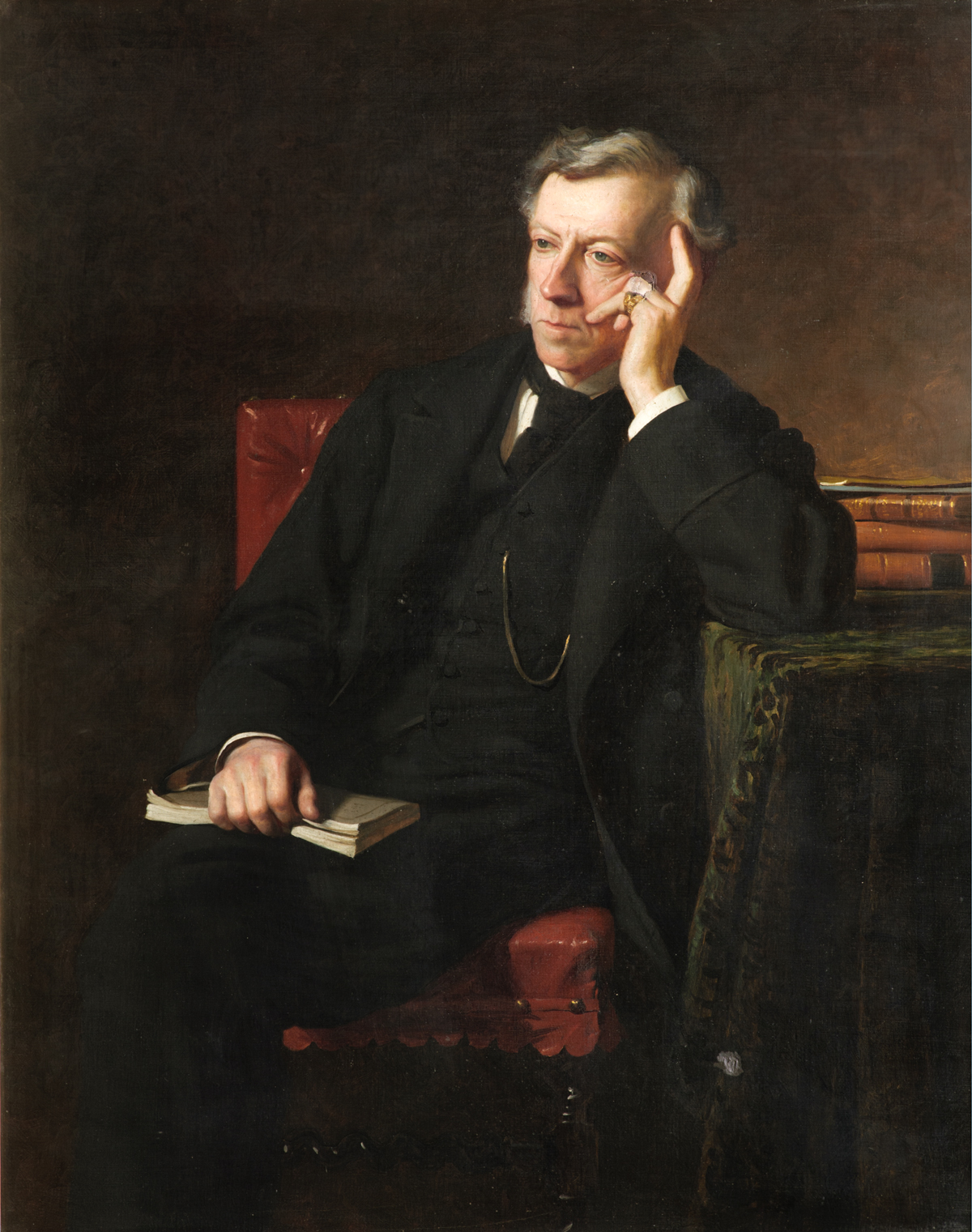
William Ferguson, Chairman of the Great North of Scotland Railway 1878–1904

==== Renewal and extension ====
In 1879 the chairman, Lord Provost Leslie, died and was replaced by William Ferguson of Kinmundy. (Note: William Ferguson (1823–1904) was an Aberdeen businessman who had joined the board of the Great North in 1867 and elected deputy chairman in 1878. Ferguson, a Presbyterian, was also involved in India textiles and in 1881 published "The Great North of Scotland Railway", a guide to the areas served by the Great North. As his family seat was Kinmundy House, Mintlaw he was known affectionately at the railway as Kinmundy and maintained good relationship with staff.) The following year both the Secretary and General Manager resigned and William Moffatt was appointed to both posts, and A.G. Reid became Superintendent of the Line. The railway was now paying a dividend and seeing increased traffic, but rolling stock, track, signals and stations all needed replacing in a project that was to cost £250,000 (equivalent to £26,860,000 in 2025). By June 1880 the main line was doubled as far as Kintore, and over the next five years 142 1/2 miles (229.3 km) of iron rail track, much of it without fishplates, was replaced with steel rails and the main line doubled between Dyce and Inveramsay. The railway had acquired a reputation for running slow trains on a perverse timetable and ill-treating its passengers, and now resolved to address this. By the mid-1880s services were faster, there was upholstery in third class and the branches saw an accelerated service as a result of running fewer mixed trains.

On 27 November 1882 Inverythan Bridge on the Macduff Branch near Auchterless collapsed as a locomotive hauling five goods wagons, a brake van and four carriages crossed. The locomotive and tender crossed the bridge, but the wagons and carriages fell 30 feet (9.1 m) to the road below, killing five people who had been travelling in the first and second carriages and injuring fifteen others. The Board of Trade report found that the collapse was due to an internal fault in a cast-iron beam that had been fitted when the bridge had been built in 1857.

A bill was introduced to Parliament in 1881 to extend the line from Portsoy along the Moray Firth to Buckie, to be opposed by the Highland and rejected. The following year both the Great North and Highland railways applied to Parliament, the Great North for a 25 1/4-mile (40.6 km) line from Portsoy along the coast through Buckie to Elgin, and the Highland for a branch from Keith to Buckie and Cullen. Authority was granted, but in the case of the Highland Railway only for a line as far as Portessie, with running rights over the Great North coast line between Buckie and Portsoy and the Great North obtaining reciprocal rights over the Highland railway between Elgin and Forres. The coast line opened in stages, the outer sections from Portsoy to Tochieneal and Elgin to Garmouth opening in 1884. The centre section, which involved heavy engineering, with a long viaduct with a central span of 350 feet (110 m) over the Spey at Garmouth and embankments and viaducts at Cullen, opened in May 1886. The line was served by four trains a day and a fast through train from Aberdeen that reached Elgin in 2 3/4 hours. The Highland Portessie branch had opened in 1884 and the Highland did not exercise its running rights over the Coast Line, thus preventing the Great North running over its lines west of Elgin.

The Great North had opened using a system of telegraphic train orders, and as the signalling was being upgraded this was being replaced with electric tablet working over the single line sections. Now express trains had to slow to exchange tokens in a process that frequently left railwaymen injured, so James Manson, the locomotive superintendent, designed an automatic token exchange system based on apparatus used to move cotton in a factory. At first tokens were exchanged at 15 miles per hour (24 km/h), but soon they were exchanged at line speed. After trialling on the Fraserburgh line, the system was installed on the coast route in May 1889, and by 1 January 1893 it was in operation on all single-line sections.

==== Aberdeen to Inverness ====
The Great North and Highland had agreed in 1865 that Keith would be the exchange point for traffic between the two railways, but in 1886 the Great North had two lines to Elgin that, although longer than the Highland's direct line, served more populous areas. The coastal route between Keith and Elgin was 87 1/2 miles (140.8 km) long but had easier gradients than the 80 3/4 miles (130.0 km) via Craigellachie. The Highland's main line south from Inverness was via Forres, the Great North believing that their competitors treated the line to Elgin as a branch. In 1883 a shorter route south from Inverness was promoted by an independent company, the bill defeated in parliament only after the Highland had promised to request authority for a shorter line. The following year, as well as the Highland's more direct line from Aviemore, the Great North proposed a branch from its Speyside Section to Inverness. The Highland Railway route was chosen, but the Great North won a concession that goods and passengers that could be exchanged at any junction with through bookings and with services conveniently arranged.

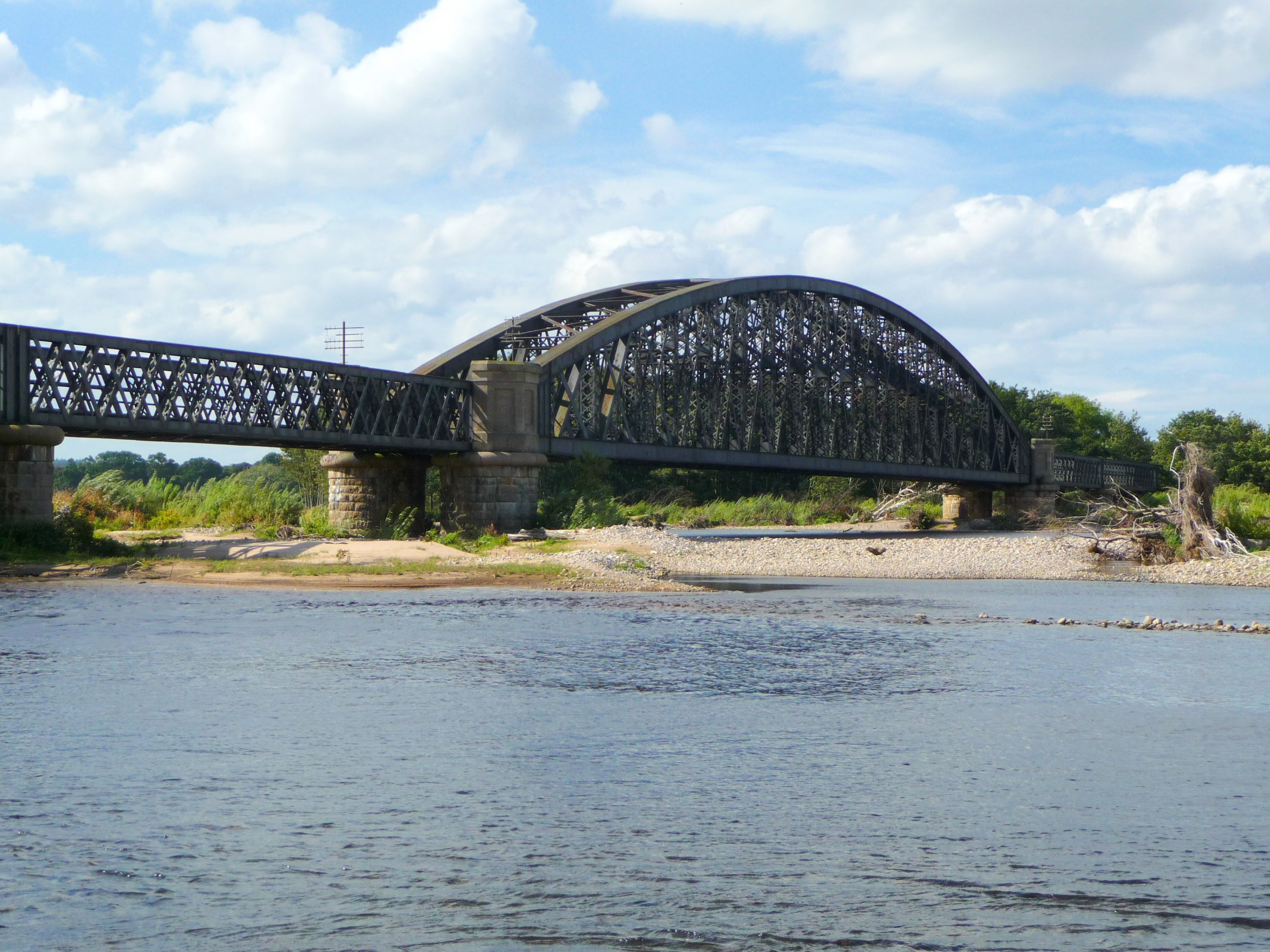
The Coastal route opened in 1886, crossing the Spey by viaduct near Garmouth.

In 1885 the Great North re-timed the 10:10 am Aberdeen service to reach Keith at 11:50 am with through carriages that reached Elgin via Craigellachie at 1 pm. (Note: This connected at Aberdeen with the mail train that had left London at 8 pm the previous evening. After trialling a sorting carriage borrowed from the Caledonian Railway, the Great North built two in 1886 and installed lineside apparatus at several main line stations.) This connected with a Highland service at both Keith and Elgin, until the Highland re-timed the train and broke the connection at Elgin. The Great North applied to the Board of Trade for an order for two connections a day at Elgin. This was refused, but in 1886 the Great North and Highland railways came to an agreement to pool receipts from the stations between Grange and Elgin and refer any disputes to an arbiter. The midday Highland train was re-timed to connect with the Great North at Keith and Elgin, and a service connected at Elgin with an Aberdeen train that had divided en route to travel via the coast and Craigellachie.

In 1893 the Highland cancelled the traffic agreement and withdrew two connecting trains, complaining that they were unprofitable. One of the trains was reinstated after an appeal was made to the Railway and Canal Commissioners and a frustrated Great North applied to parliament in 1895 for running powers to Inverness, but withdrew after it was agreed that the Railway and Canal Commissioners would arbitrate in the matter. With no judgment by 1897, the Great North prepared to apply again for running powers over the Highland to Inverness, this time agreeing to double track the line, but the commissioners published their finding before the bill was submitted to Parliament. Traffic was to be exchanged at both Elgin and Keith, the services exchanged at Elgin needed to include through carriages from both the Craigellachie and the coast routes, and the timetable had to be approved by the commissioners. The resulting Commissioners' Service started in 1897 with eight through services, four via the Highland to Keith taking between 4 1/2 and 5 hours, and four with carriages exchanged at Elgin with portions that travelled via Craigellachie and the coast, two of these taking 3 1/2 hours. (Note: Timings of possibly two different 6:45 am Aberdeen services were published in The Railway Magazine and the February 1897 issue of Locomotive Magazine. The train, a locomotive and seven 6-wheeler carriages, ran non-stop from Aberdeen to Huntly at an average speed of 54.3 miles per hour (87.4 km/h). The train stood for five minutes at Huntly whilst the locomotive was watered and two carriages detached, before continuing to Tillynaught, Portsoy, Cullen, Buckie and finally Elgin. The speed between the last two stops averaged 49.2 miles per hour (79.2 km/h).) The 3 pm from Inverness to Aberdeen via Keith took 3 hours 5 minutes. Initially portions for the coast and Craigellachie divided at Huntly, but Cairnie Platform was opened at Grange Junction in summer 1898. The main line was double track to Huntly in 1896 and Keith in 1898, except for a single-track bridge over the Deveron between Avochie and Rothiemay, which was replaced by a double-track bridge in 1900.

==== Subbies and hotels ====
In 1880 an express was introduced on the Deeside Line, taking 90 minutes to travel from Aberdeen to Ballater; by 1886 this had reduced to 75 minutes. In 1887 the service between Aberdeen and Dyce had improved with more local trains and new stations; by the end of that year there were twelve trains a day, eventually becoming twenty trains a day calling at nine stops in twenty minutes. The trains were initially called the Jubilees, as it was Queen Victoria's Golden Jubilee, but became known as the Subbies. Suburban services were also introduced between Aberdeen and Culter on the Deeside Line in 1894, after the track had been doubled, starting with ten down and nine up trains calling at seven stops in twenty-two minutes. The number of trains was eventually doubled and an additional station provided.

Great North of Scotland Railway (Various Powers) Act 1893
- Act of Parliament
- Parliament of the United Kingdom
- Long title: An Act to authorise the Great North of Scotland Railway Company to extend their Railway to buy Additional Land and for other purposes.
- Citation: 56 & 57 Vict. c. cci

Dates
- Royal assent: 24 August 1893

Text of statute as originally enacted

In 1891 the company offices were moved from Waterloo to a new building in Guild Street with direct access to the station. The same year the Great North took over the Palace Hotel (closed after a fire in 1941), near the joint railway station in Aberdeen and modernised it, installing electric lighting and building a covered way between the hotel and station. Encouraged by its success, the company obtained permission in the Great North of Scotland Railway (Various Powers) Act 1893 (56 & 57 Vict. c. cci) to build an hotel and golf course at Cruden Bay, about 20 miles (32 km) north of Aberdeen. The hotel was linked to the Great North by the Boddam Branch, a new 15 1/2-mile (24.9 km) single-track branch from Ellon, on the Buchan section, which served Cruden Bay and fishing town at Boddam. The line opened in 1897 with services from Ellon taking about forty minutes. The hotel opened in 1899, connected to the railway station by the Cruden Bay Hotel Tramway. This was nearly 1 mile (1.6 km) long, with a gauge of 3 ft 6 in (1,067 mm) and operated by electric tramcars that took power from an overhead line. Seasonal through services to Aberdeen began in 1899 with an up service in the morning; for some years an afternoon up service returned in the evening. Excursions for tourists had operated on the Deeside Line from 1881, later joined by special services on the Strathspey Line and the Coast Line alongside the Moray Firth, promoted as the Scottish Riviera.

=== Maturity, 1900–1914 ===
There was interest at the end of the 19th century in using the new Light Railways Act 1896 to approve lines to serve rural areas. The 17-mile (27 km) long Aberdeenshire Light Railway was independently promoted in 1896 to serve Skene and Echt, with tracks laid along the public roads in Aberdeen. The Great North proposed an alternative Echt Light Railway and a line to Newburgh that would both use the Aberdeen tramway tracks in the city. In 1897 a line from Echt to Aberdeen was approved, but only as far the city outskirts after opposition to laying tracks in the public roads or using the tramways for goods traffic. The plans were changed to connect the line with the Great North at Kittybrewster, but the scheme abandoned after the costs had started to rise.

The Great North was granted a light railway order, the Fraserburgh and St. Combs Light Railway Order 1899 on 8 September 1899 for a 5 1/8-mile (8.2 km) light railway from Fraserburgh to St Combs. The order included a clause, unusual for the time, permitting the use of electric traction; but the company opted for steam traction, and the locomotives were fitted with cowcatchers as the line was unfenced. Services started on 1 July 1903, with six trains a day that took 17 minutes to complete the journey. A light railway was proposed to cover the 4 1/2 miles (7.2 km) from Fraserburgh to Rosehearty, but the scheme was abandoned after opposition to laying tracks on the public road.

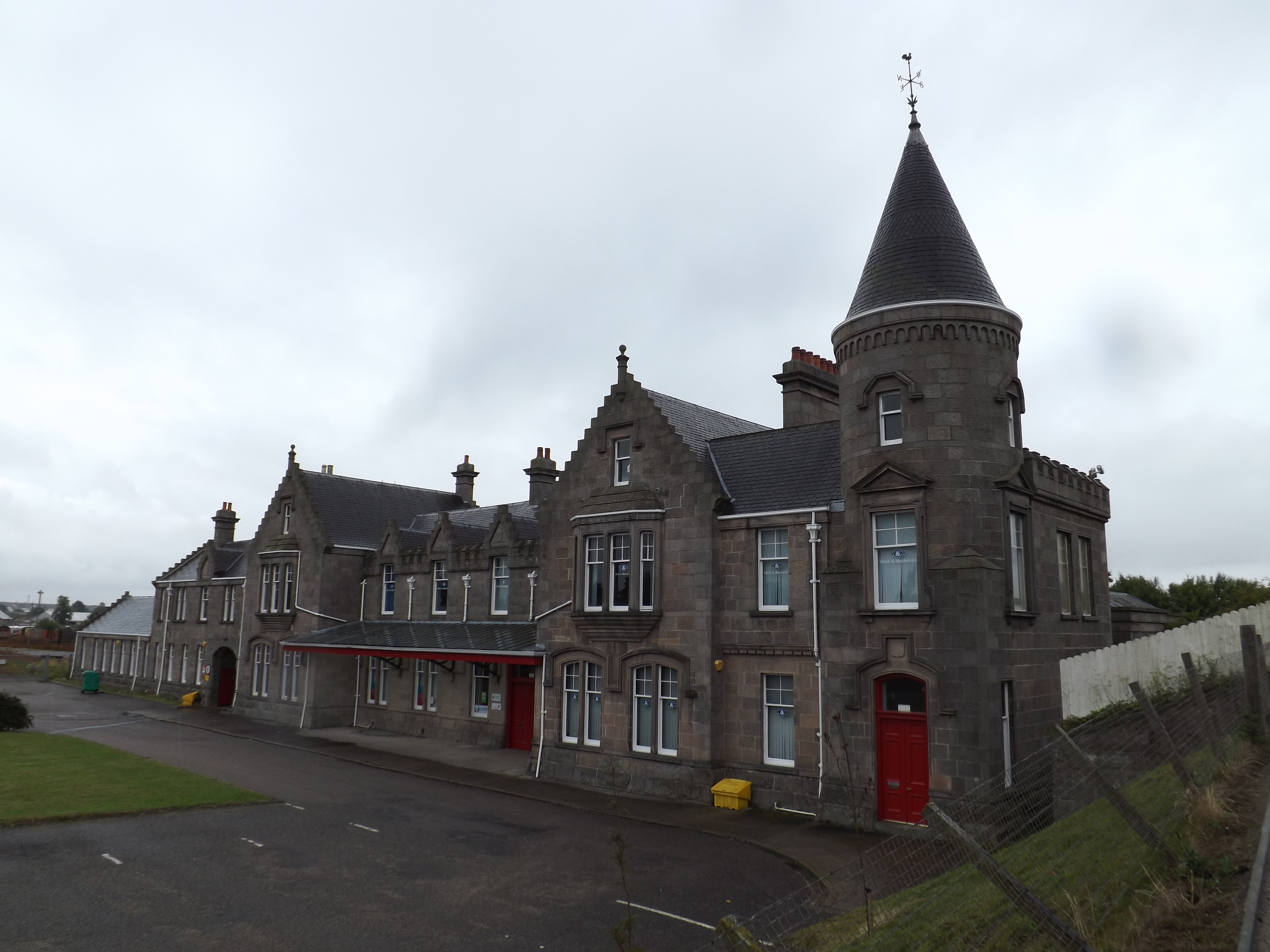
The Great North's Elgin station, rebuilt in 1902, still stands today and is a Category B listed building

Finding its locomotive works at Kittybrewster cramped and inadequate, the Great North began construction on a new works at Inverurie in 1898, electric lighting being provided in the buildings. The carriage and wagon department moved in 1901, the locomotive department in 1902, the offices the following year and the permanent way department in 1905; the buildings still stand and are listed Category B. (Note: Buildings are classified in three categories: Category A are buildings of national or international importance, Category B are buildings of regional or more than local importance and Category C are buildings of local importance.) Inverurie station was rebuilt nearer the works in 1902, and is similarly a Category B building. The Great North built houses nearby for its staff, lit by electricity generated at the works, and the Inverurie Loco Works Football Club was formed by staff in 1902.

The Great North rebuilt Elgin station in 1902 to replace a temporary wooden building dating from the 1860s, a joint structure with the adjacent station having been declined by the Highland Railway. Following negotiations, amalgamation of the Highland and the Great North of Scotland Railways was accepted by the Great North shareholders in early 1906, but the Highland board withdrew after opposition from a minority of its shareholders. The Aberdeen and Inverness trains were jointly worked after 1908 and locomotives were no longer exchanged at Keith or Elgin; between 1914 and 1916 the Highland paid the Great North to provide locomotives for all of the services through to Inverness.

In spring 1904 the Great North began a motor omnibus service to Braemar, connecting with trains at Ballater. These early buses had solid tyres and a legal speed limit of 12 miles per hour (19 km/h), but were faster than the horse-drawn coaches they replaced. By 1907 buses connected with Great North train services and conveyed passengers to Strathdon, Midmar, Echt, Cluny Castle and Aberchirder, between Cock Bridge and Tomintoul a horse-drawn coach was used as the motor buses could not ascend the steep road. Services from Aberdeen connected with trains at Schoolhill, where a refreshment room was built. In 1914 the railway had 35 passenger road vehicles that, together with 15 five-ton lorries, worked 159 miles (256 km) daily.

Aberdeen joint station was congested, resulting in delayed trains, and the low, open platforms were frequently covered in oily slime due to the large quantities of fish that passed through. Agreement with the Caledonian Railway (Note: The Caledonian Railway had absorbed the Scottish North Eastern Railway in 1866.) over rebuilding the station had been reached in 1899, but the companies fell out over widening the line to the south. Moving the goods station to the east was similarly complex, with conflicts with the harbour commissioners and the town council. In 1908 new platforms on the western side opened and the adjoining station hotel was bought in 1910. Foundations for the new building were laid in 1913 and the station was largely complete by July 1914, although outbreak of war delayed further progress and the station was finally completed in 1920.

=== War and grouping, 1914–1922 ===
With Britain's declaration of war on the German Empire on 4 August 1914, the government took control of the railways under the Regulation of the Forces Act 1871 (34 & 35 Vict. c. 86). Day-to-day operations were left in the control of local management, but movements necessary for the war were coordinated by a committee of general managers. The Great North of Scotland's main role was providing a relief route when the Highland Railway route south to Perth was congested, on one Sunday conveying twenty-one troop specials from Keith to Aberdeen. Timber from the forests of the north of Scotland were carried from sidings at Kemnay, Knockando and Nethy Bridge. A total of 609 staff left to serve in the war, and a memorial to the 93 who died in action was erected at the offices in Aberdeen. Services were maintained until 1916, when staff shortages reduced services, although no lines were closed.

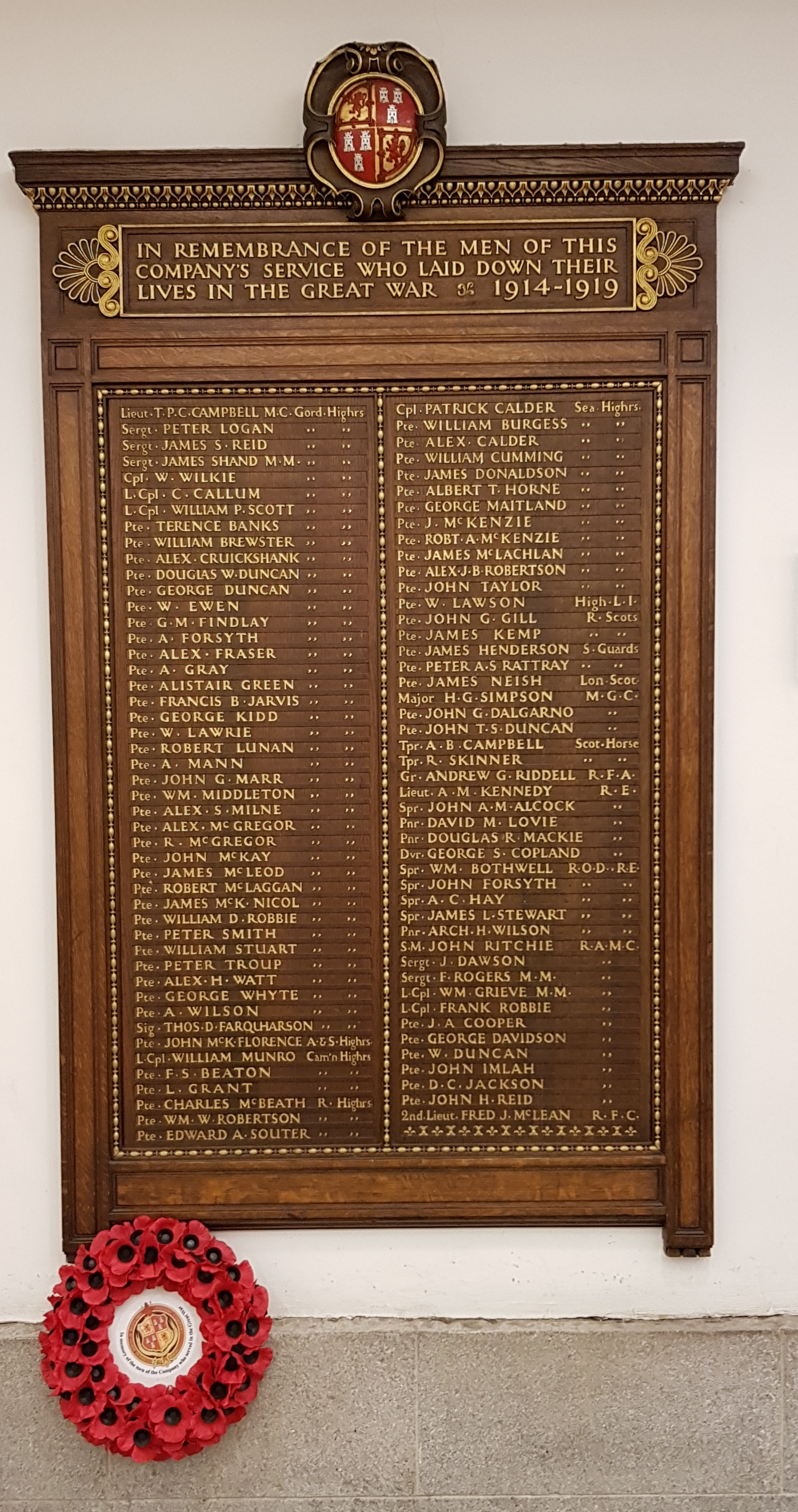
GNSR War Memorial, Aberdeen Railway Station

The railways were in a poor state after the war, costs having increased, with higher wages, the introduction of an eight-hour day and increased price of coal. A scheme was devised whereby the railways would be grouped into four large companies; this was approved by Parliament as the Railways Act 1921. At the start of the 20th century the company's shares had been restructured; the final dividends were 3 per cent on preferred stock, unaltered from previously, and 1 1/2 per cent on ordinary stock, slightly above average. Before grouping the Great North of Scotland Railway operated 333 1/2 route miles (536.7 km) of track.

=== London and North Eastern Railway ===
On 1 January 1923 the Great North of Scotland became an isolated part of the Scottish division of the London and North Eastern Railway (LNER), the Caledonian to the south and Highland to the west both becoming part of a different group, the London, Midland and Scottish Railway. That summer a sleeping carriage operated between Lossiemouth and London King's Cross, and a through carriage ran from Edinburgh Waverley to Cruden Bay on Fridays. Sunday services were re-introduced; from 1928 Aberdeen suburban services ran hourly during the afternoon and evenings. Afterwards the economic situation deteriorated and the railway companies advised the trade unions in 1928 that wages would need to be cut; this was implemented in August 1930 after the Wall Street crash the previous year. Economy measures were introduced and unprofitable passenger services withdrawn, the Oldmeldrum branch closing on 2 November 1931 and the branch to Cruden Bay and Boddam on 31 October 1932. Road transport was arranged for guests at the Cruden Bay hotel, from Ellon for the first summer season, and then from Aberdeen.

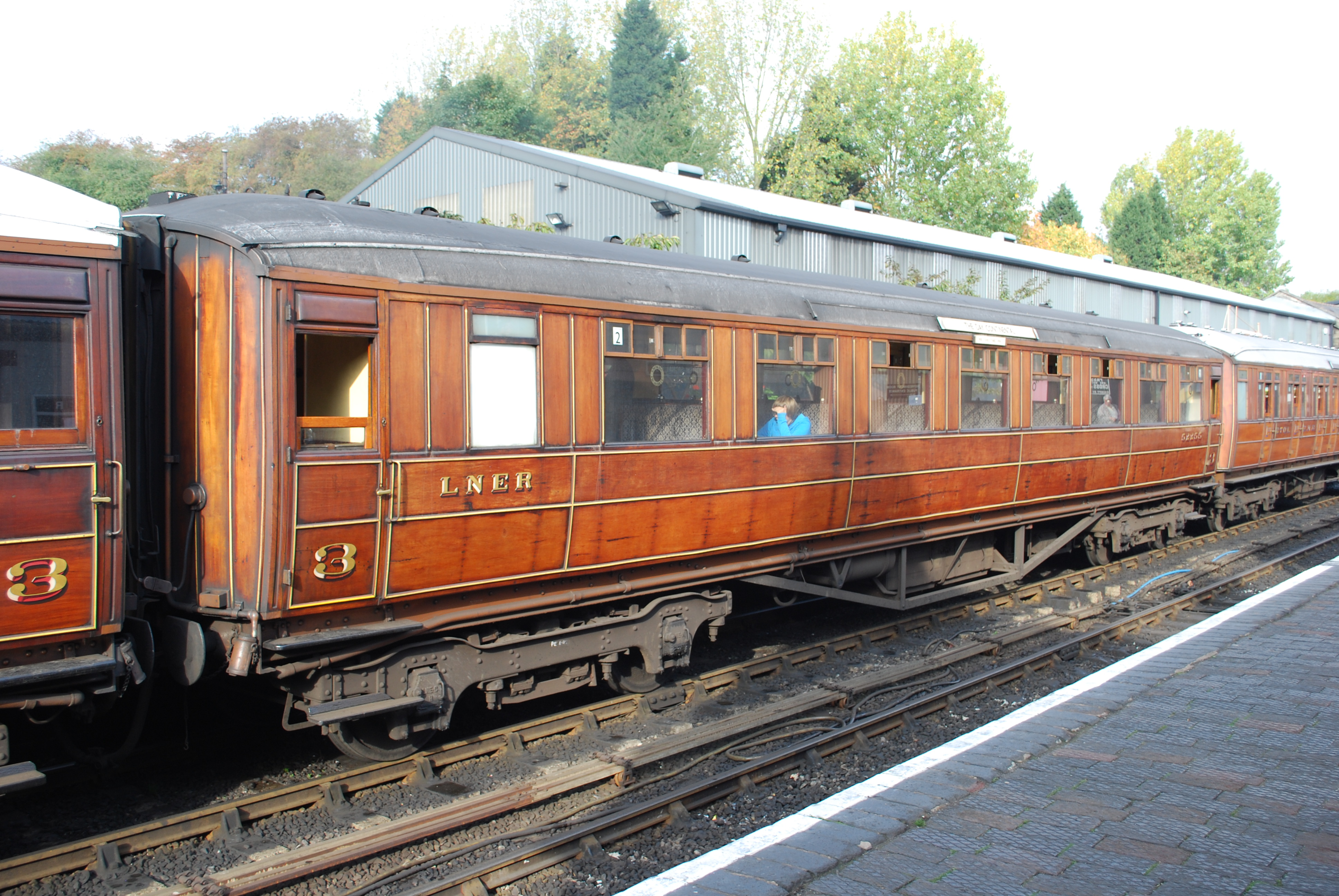
LNER Gresley bogie carriages were in use on former Great North services by 1937

Carriages were transferred in to replace the older four-wheelers, former North Eastern Railway vehicles in 1924–25 and fifty former Great Eastern Railway six-wheelers between 1926 and 1929 for the Aberdeen suburban services. By 1936 more up to date Gresley bogie carriages (Note: Also known as a truck, a bogie is a four- or six-wheeled module attached by a pivot to the underside of a vehicle.) were used on the primary trains. Optimism returned and traffic increased after 1933, and a luxury rail land cruise, the "Northern Belle", ran over former Great North lines. However, the Aberdeen subbies had been losing money for some time as a result of competition from the local buses, and from 5 April 1937 the local services between Aberdeen, Dyce and Culter were withdrawn and most of the intermediate stations closed.

The railways were again placed under government control on 1 September 1939, and Britain was at war two days later. The Cruden Bay Hotel was used as an army hospital and the tramway ceased operating in 1941. Handed back to the railway in 1945, it never reopened. The Palace Hotel burnt down in 1941. The Station Hotel was used as an admiralty administrative centre, and reopened in 1950 after refurbishment.

=== British Railways ===
Britain's railways were nationalised on 1 January 1948 and the former Great North of Scotland Railway lines were placed under the control of the Scottish Region of British Railways. To reduce costs the Alford branch was closed to passengers on 2 January 1950, followed by the Macduff Branch on 1 October 1951.

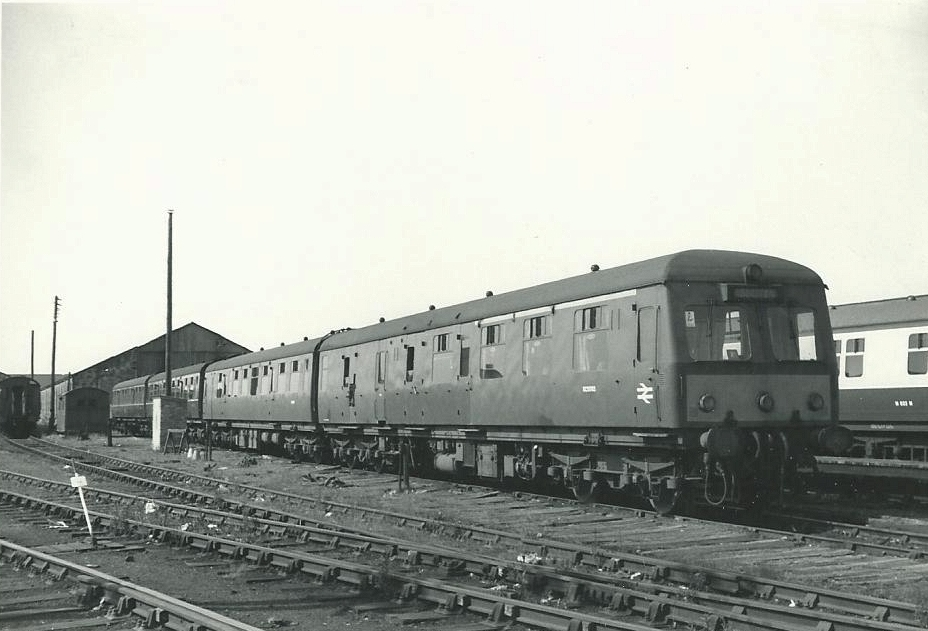
Cross Country DMU at Inverness in 1968

The 1955 Modernisation Plan, known formally as the "Modernisation and Re-Equipment of the British Railways", was published in December 1954, and with the aim of increasing speed and reliability the steam trains were replaced with electric and diesel traction. In 1958 a battery-electric railcar was introduced on the Deeside Line and a diesel railbus on the Speyside Section. Diesel Multiple Units (DMU) took over services to Peterhead and Fraserburgh in 1959 and from 1960 cross-country types were used on an accelerated Aberdeen to Inverness service that allowed 2 1/2 hours for four stops. By 1961 the only service still using steam locomotives was the branch from Tillynaught to Banff.

In 1963 Dr Beeching published his report "The Reshaping of British Railways", which recommended closing the network's least used stations and lines. Only the Aberdeen to Keith main line survived, albeit without its stopping services and the remaining former Great North lines closed to passengers. The Lossiemouth and Banff branch closed in 1964 and the following year the St Combs branch, line from Dyce to Peterhead and Fraserburgh and the Speyside section closed and local services to Inverurie were withdrawn. Attempts to save the Deeside section to Banchory failed and it closed in 1966. On 6 May 1968 services were withdrawn on the Coast Line, the former Great North line via Craigellachie and the local services between Aberdeen and Elgin. The Beeching Report had recommended Inverurie and Insch stations for closure, but these were saved by the subsequent inquiry.

The goods service at individual stations was also withdrawn after Beeching's report. A freightliner depot opened at Aberdeen in 1966, allowing the Peterhead line to close completely on 7 September 1970. In 1969–70 the line between Aberdeen and Keith was singled, with passing loops, the line to Fraserburgh closing completely in 1979 and that from Keith to Dufftown in 1985. In the 1969 timetable there were early morning trains between Aberdeen and Inverurie, and five services a day between Aberdeen to Inverness, supplemented by two Aberdeen to Elgin services that by the late 1970s were running through to Inverness. The cross-country DMUs were replaced in 1980 by diesel locomotives hauling Mark I compartment coaches, later Mark II open saloons. These were similarly replaced in the late 1980s and early 1990s by newer DMUs, first the Class 156 Super Sprinter and then Class 158 Express and Class 170 units.

=== Legacy ===
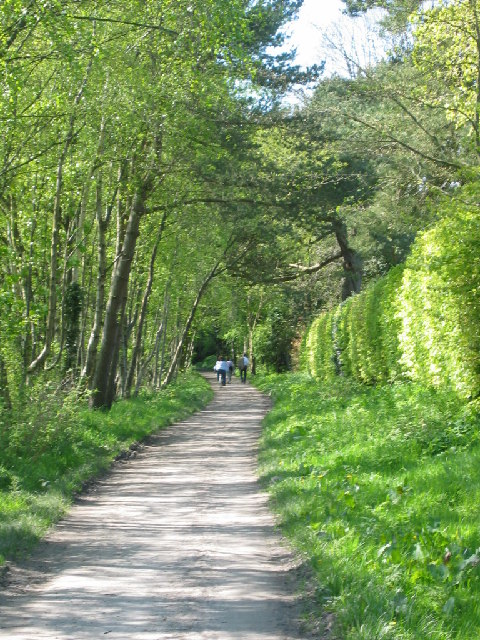
Deeside way at Garthdee

The Aberdeen to Inverness Line currently uses the former Great North of Scotland Railway line as far Keith with stations at Dyce, Inverurie, Insch, Huntly and Keith. Eleven trains a day run between Aberdeen and Inverness, taking about 2 1/4 hours, supplemented between Aberdeen and Inverurie by approximately the same number of local trains. In a project scheduled for completion in 2030, the line is to be improved to allow a regular hourly Aberdeen to Inverness service, additional commuter trains into Inverness and Aberdeen and new stations at Kintore and Dalcross, near Inverness airport.

Heritage and tourist railways also use the former Great North of Scotland Railway alignment. The Keith and Dufftown Railway runs seasonal services over the 11 miles (18 km) between Keith Town and Dufftown using Class 108 diesel multiple units. The Strathspey Railway operates seasonal services over the former Highland Railway route from Aviemore to Grantown-on-Spey via the joint Highland and Great North Boat of Garten station. The Royal Deeside Railway operates over 1 mile (1.6 km) of former Deeside Railway at Milton of Crathes near Banchory during summer weekends and in December, and based at Alford railway station is the Alford Valley Railway, which seasonally operates a 3/4-mile (1.2 km) narrow gauge railway.

Former alignments have been opened as long distance rail trails for pedestrians, cyclists and horses. The 53-mile (85 km) Formartine and Buchan Way runs from Dyce to Maud before dividing to follow the two branches to Peterhead and Fraserburgh. The Deeside Way is open between Aberdeen and Kincardine O'Neil and Aboyne and Ballater.

Nestrans (The North East of Scotland Transport Partnership), the organization responsible for local transport strategy, consider that building new railways along these routes would not be beneficial at the moment but the alignments are protected from development. The Speyside Way, one of Scotland's Long Distance Routes, mostly follows the route of the Speyside section between Craigellachie and Ballindalloch and Grantown and Nethy Bridge.

== Rolling stock ==
=== Locomotives ===
==== Early locomotives ====
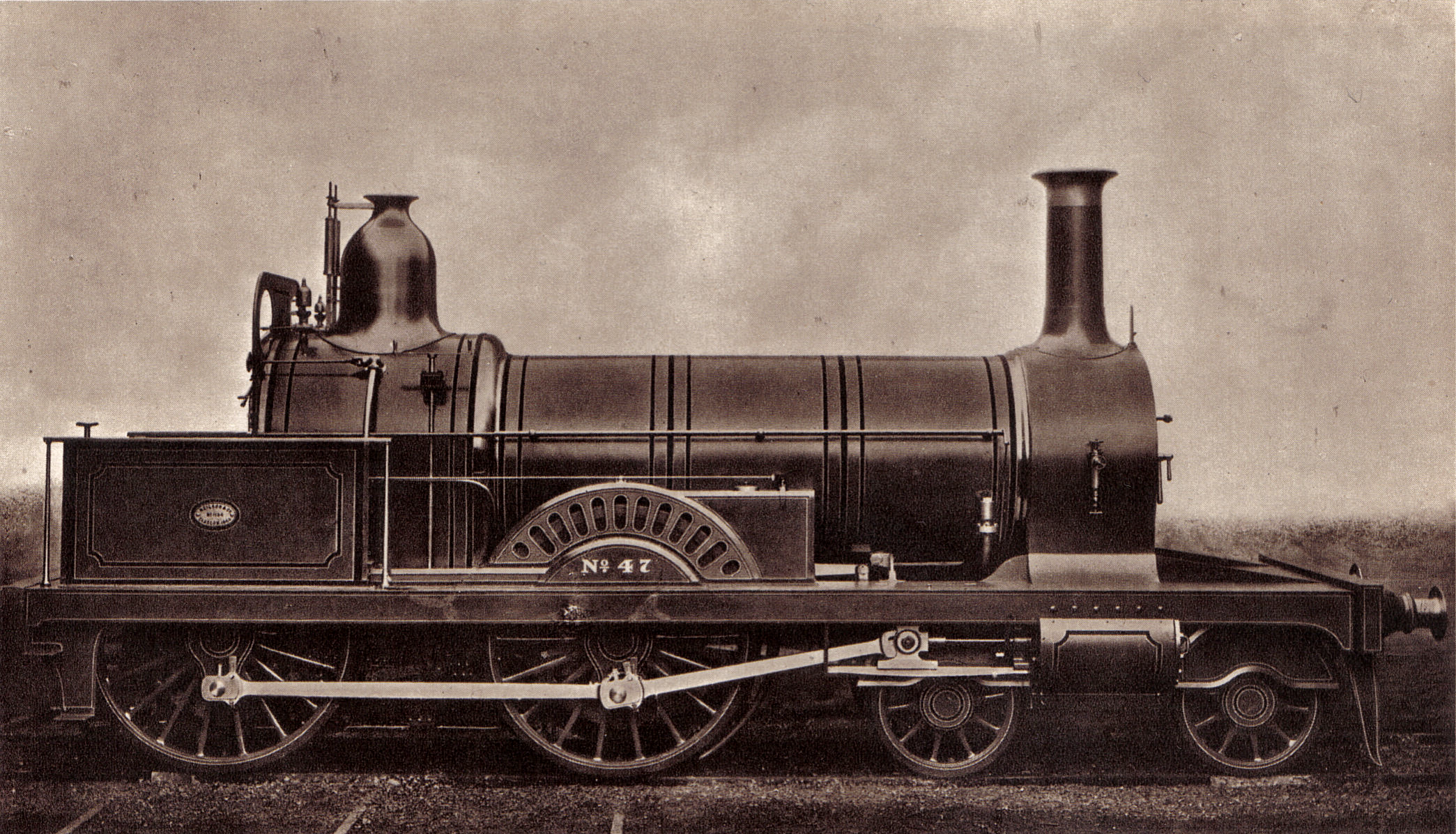
One of the locomotives built in 1866

The first locomotives were 2-4-0 tender engines, built by Wm Fairbairn in Manchester to the design of the locomotive superintendent Daniel Kinnear Clark. Twelve were ordered for the opening of the first line, seven passenger and five goods. They were all fitted with Clark's patent smoke preventing system that improved fuel economy and painted green with black borders, and red buffer beams. There was no protection for the driver or fireman and braking was by wooden blocks on the four wheels of the tender. The railway opened with only five locomotives, and within days one had been seriously damaged in the collision at Kittybrewster and a second had a mechanical fault. Two more locomotives had arrived by the end of 1854, and the order was complete by summer 1855. Four more passenger locomotives were ordered in 1857, weatherboards and sanding equipment had been fitted by 1860, and cabs added in the 1880s. John Folds Ruthven replaced Clark in 1855 and an order was placed with Beyer, Peacock & Co. for two 0-4-0 tank engines (Note: On a tank engine or tank locomotive the water is held in tanks near the boiler and small amount of coal is kept behind the footplate, rather than being held on a separate tender.) to bank trains on the line to Waterloo near Aberdeen harbour. After William Cowan became locomotive superintendent nine more locomotives arrived in 1859–61. These were followed by nine 4-4-0s, also built by R. Stephenson & Co., and delivered between 1862 and 1864. Six more powerful 4-4-0 locomotives arrived from Neilsons in 1866, and were fitted with a more modern bogie. Three passed to the London and North Eastern Railway after the 1923 Grouping, and No. 45 hauled a train at the Railway Centenary celebrations in 1925 before being scrapped.

In 1863 the Great North took over the operation of the Banffshire and Morayshire Railways and absorbed their locomotives. The Banffshire had four locomotives, two 0-4-2 tanks, named "Banff" and "Portsoy", built by Hawthorns of Leith for the line's opening in 1859. The other two locomotives were 0-4-2 tender engines, one bought secondhand from the Scottish Central Railway, having been built in 1848 by the Vulcan Foundry in Warrington and named "Keith", and a similar tender engine built by Hawthorns. The Morayshire Railway had started services in 1852 with two 2-2-0 engines designed by James Samuel and built by Neilsons. The locomotives had proved inadequate and were replaced by two larger 2-4-0 tank engines. The Great North took over the operation of the Deeside Railway in 1866. Its first two locomotives were 0-4-2 tank engines, built by Hawthorns and arrived in 1854. No. 3, a tender locomotive, was delivered in 1854 from Dodds & Son of Rotherham, but this had mechanical defects and was never satisfactory. Between 1857 and 1866 four 0-4-2 tender locomotives arrived from Hawthorns; these were similar to the Banffshire's Nos. 3 and 4; the Deeside also bought the Banffshire's No. 4 in 1864. One of these locomotives was given a large six-wheeled tender to allow it to haul the Royal Train from Aberdeen to Ballater without stopping. The tender locomotives were found to be unstable at high speeds were all withdrawn by 1880.

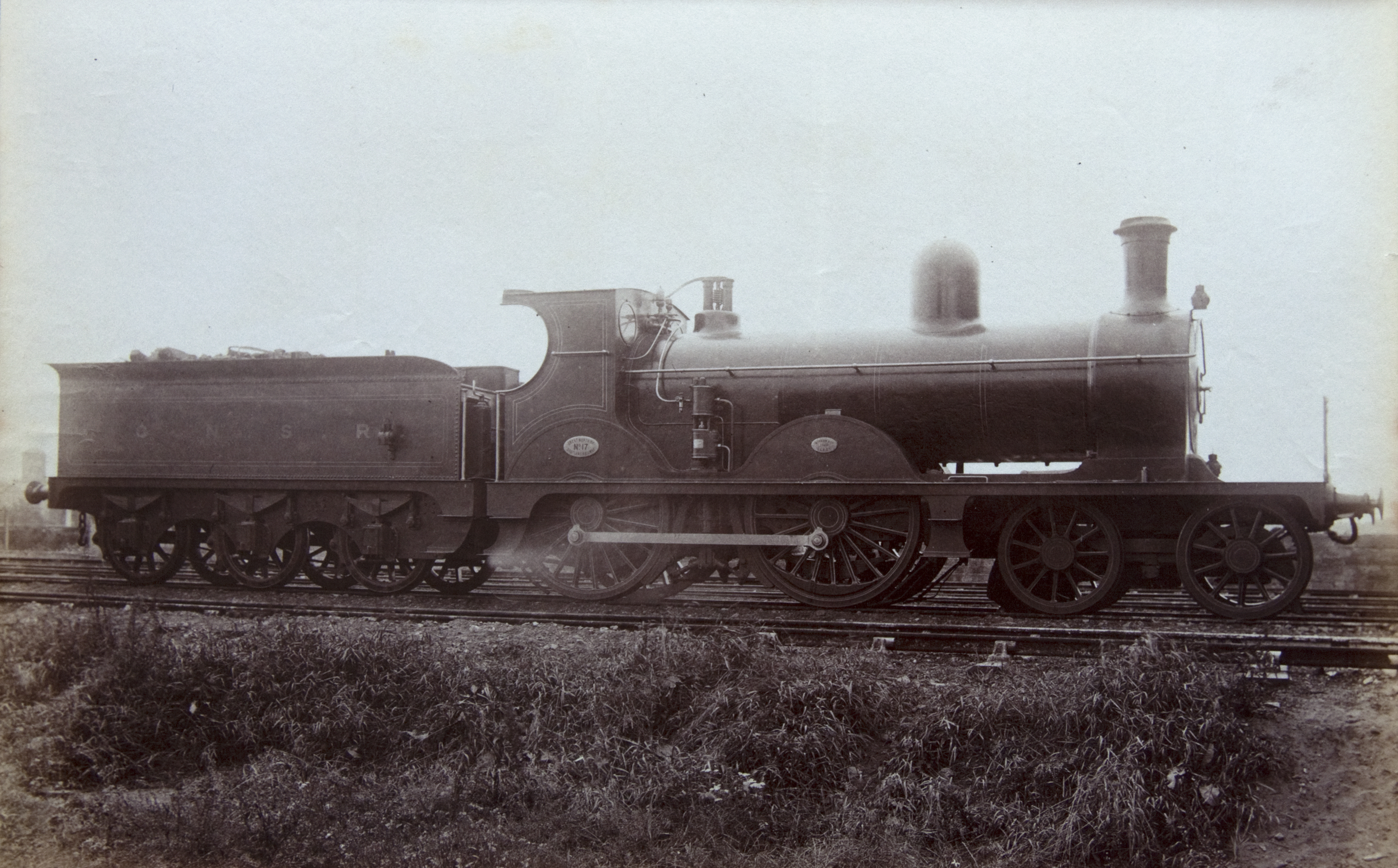
Class O No. 17

The company's financial difficulties after 1866 had precluded the purchasing of any more locomotives until six 4-4-0 locomotives were built in 1876 by Neilson's, partly to replace the Deeside locomotives. These had larger boilers and fireboxes than previous locomotives and were the first to be built with cabs. The next twelve locomotives had rounded splashers over the trailing driving wheels, meaning the shape of the cab was different, but retained the brass dome on the firebox, copper capped chimney and had brass bands joining the firebox and boiler. After James Manson became locomotive superintendent in 1883 he introduced a more contemporary design of locomotive, with inside cylinders and doors on the side of cabs and without brass domes or copper chimneys. The first six were built by Kitson & Co in Leeds in 1884, followed by three similar but lighter in 1885. The railway had inherited most of its tank engines from the Deeside, Morayshire and Banffshire Railways and these needed replacing, so six arrived in 1884 and three slightly larger the following year. The first tank engines in the country to be fitted with doors on the cabs, these worked on the suburban services and one was fitted with a cowcatcher to work the St Combs Light Railway at Fraserburgh. In 1887 two locomotives were built at Kittybrewster works. Although there was only space for four locomotives in the cramped repair shops the board expected to save £300 to £400 by building the locomotives themselves. Nine express locomotives with six-wheeled tenders were built by Kitsons in 1888 and these were followed by six more with eight-wheeled tenders built by Stephenson & Co, one of which was successfully trialled in 1914 with a superheater. Most of Manson's later locomotives were subsequently fitted with superheaters, the eight-wheeled tenders being replaced in most cases with six-wheeled tenders during the rebuild.

==== Class S and later ====
In 1890 Manson was replaced as locomotive superintendent by James Johnson, the son of Samuel W. Johnson, then locomotive superintendent at the Midland Railway. In 1893 Neilsons delivered six new 4-4-0 tender locomotives that were more powerful any previous Great North locomotive and the first not to have Clark's smoke prevention apparatus. Classified as Class S and known for rapid acceleration and sustained high speed, these were the blueprint for the later Great North tender locomotives. Manson had left a design for a 0-4-4 tank locomotive and Johnson changed the firebox, boiler and value gear so they were the same as the Class S tender locomotives before ordering nine to work the Deeside Line. These arrived in 1893 and most were transferred to the Aberdeen suburban services in 1900.

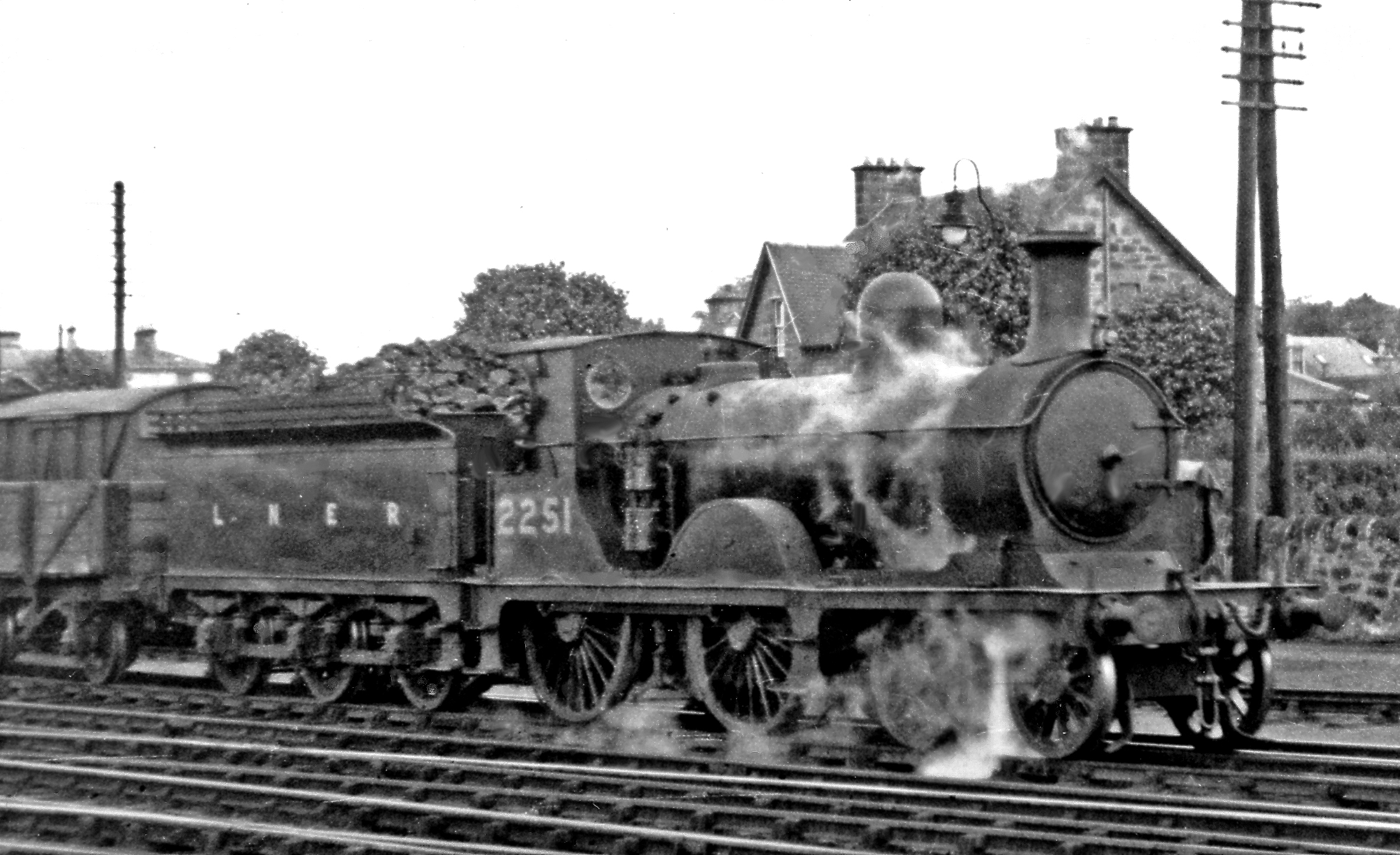
LNER 2251, built by the Great North as Class T No. 107, is seen here shunting at Elgin in 1948.

William Pickersgill replaced Johnson in 1894, and between 1895 and 1898 twenty-six new locomotives were purchased from Neilsons. Similar to Johnson's Class S, they were recorded at speeds of 79.66 miles per hour (128.20 km/h) and running the 26 1/2 miles (42.6 km) from Kennethmont to Dyce in 23 minutes 46 seconds. A further order for ten was placed in 1899, but train mileage had been reduced and five were sold to the South Eastern & Chatham Railway. Pickersgill saw the works move from Kittybrewster to Inverurie before Thomas Heywood took over in 1914, three months before the outbreak of war. The railway took over the working of the Aberdeen harbour railway and in 1915 purchased four 0-4-2 tank locomotives from Manning Wardle. After the war, six more locomotives were built in 1920 by the North British Locomotive Company, (Note: North British was created in 1903 by the amalgamation of Neilsons with Sharp, Stewart and Company and Dübs and Company.) and two locomotives the following year at Inverurie. Similar to the 1899 locomotives but with Robinson superheaters, these were given names. Heywood changed the livery during the war, and the traditional green being replaced by black lined with yellow and red.

On 1 January 1923 the Great North of Scotland became a part of the Scottish division of the London and North Eastern Railway (LNER), who received a total of 122 locomotives, 100 4-4-0 tender locomotives and 22 tank engines, all capable of being used on either passenger or goods trains. Forty-four locomotives were still in service when the railway was nationalised in 1948, and the last two Great North locomotives to be withdrawn were two of the Aberdeen harbour tanks in 1960. No. 49, Gordon Highlander was restored to Great North green in 1958, although it had not previously carried the green livery as it appeared in Heywood's lined black. It was used on special trains before becoming a static exhibit at the Glasgow Transport Museum in 1965, and is currently on loan to the Scottish Railway Museum at Bo'ness.

=== Carriages ===
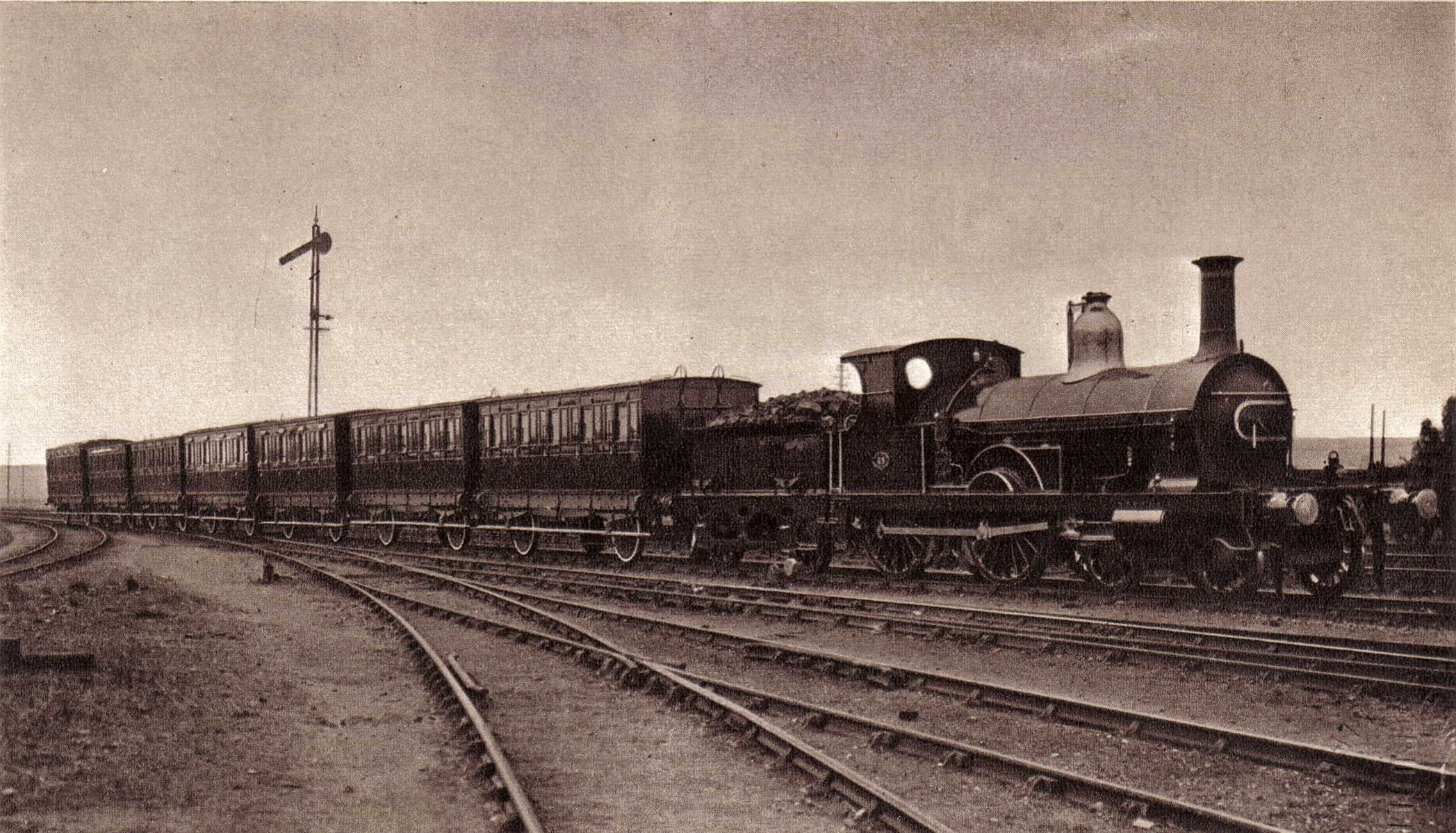
A train of old Great North carriages at the Railway Centenary at Darlington in 1925

The first carriages were 9-long-ton (9.1 t) four-wheelers, 21 feet 9 inches (6.63 m) long. Painted a dark brown with yellow lining and lettering, they had Newall's chain brake and a seat for the guard on the roof. Two classes of accommodation were provided: the first class carriages were divided into three compartments each with six upholstered seats and lit by two oil lamps hung between the partitions. Third class passengers were seated on wooden benches in a carriage seating 40 passengers sharing one oil lamp. The Great North never owned any second class carriages. Built by Brown, Marshall & Co, only half the number of carriages ordered had arrived for the start of public services in 1854. Later the guard's seat was removed and longer vehicles with six wheels were built. Accommodation for third class passengers was improved in the 1880s and the seats were upholstered.

The Westinghouse air brake was trialled on carriages in the 1880s and this became standard in 1891. As the Highland Railway used vacuum brakes, carriages used on the Aberdeen to Inverness were dual-fitted. The livery changed in the late 1890s, when the upper half was painted cream and the lower purple lake, with gold lining and lettering. Corridor carriages, 36-foot (11 m) long on six wheels, lit with electric lamps using Stone's system and with both classes having access to a lavatory appeared in 1896. Bogie corridor carriages, 48-foot (15 m) long and weighing 25 long tons (25 t) were built for the Aberdeen to Inverness express in 1898 with provision for vestibule connections. The Great North also had Royal Saloon carriage that, unusually for the Great North, was built with a clerestory roof. (Note: A clerestory roof has a raised centre section with small windows and/or ventilators.) This was 48-foot (15 m) long, lit by electric lamps and with steam heating, and divided into a first class compartment and an attendant's coupe, which was fitted with a cooking stove. Later, shorter six-wheeled and bogie compartment carriages were built for secondary services, and communication cords and steam heating were fitted in the early years of the twentieth century. No. 34, a 6-wheel carriage built in the 1890s is preserved at the Embsay & Bolton Abbey Steam Railway as part of the Stately Trains collection.

In 1905 the Great North introduced two articulated steam railcars. The locomotive unit was mounted on four 3 feet 7 inches (1.09 m) wheels, one pair driven and with the Cochran patent boiler that was common on stationary engines, but an unusual design for a locomotive. The saloon carriage accommodated 46 third class passengers on reversible lath-and-space seats and a position for the driver with controls using cables over the carriage roof. The cars were introduced on the Lossiemouth branch and the St Combs Light Railway, but when in motion there was considerable vibration that was uncomfortable for the passengers and caused problems for the steam engine. Before they were withdrawn in 1909–10, one was tried on Deeside suburban services, but had insufficient accommodation and was unable to maintain the schedule.

== Constituent railways ==
The Great North of Scotland Railway absorbed the following railways in 1866:

- The Aberdeen and Turriff Railway had been the Banff, Macduff and Turriff Junction Railway prior to 1859. The Great North supported the railway, operated the services from opening and was guarantor from 1862.
- The Banff, Macduff and Turriff Extension Railway extended the Aberdeen and Turriff from Turriff. Services were extended by the Great North over the new line from opening.
- Most of the Alford Valley Railway's directors also served on the board of the Great North, which operated services from opening and was guarantor from 1862.
- The Formartine and Buchan Railway was worked by the Great North from opening in 1861, with services from Aberdeen. The Great North was guarantor from 1863.
- The Inverury and Old Meldrum Junction Railway opened in 1856, the line was leased to the Great North from 1858.
- The Keith and Dufftown Railway was worked as an extension of the main line, services operated by the Great North from opening in 1862.
- The Strathspey Railway was sponsored by the Great North, which operated services from opening.

These companies operated by the Great North in 1866 were merged later:

- The Banffshire Railway had been the Banff, Portsoy and Strathisla Railway when it opened in 1859, the Great North taking over the operation of services from 1863 and the company renamed. Amalgamation was authorised in the Great North of Scotland Railway (Further Powers) Act 1867 (30 & 31 Vict. c. cxc).
- The Deeside Railway leased from 1 September 1866, merged 1 August 1875.
- The Aboyne and Braemar Railway was the extension of the Deeside to Ballater, and was operated by the Great North from its opening on 17 October 1866. Merged 31 January 1876.
- The Morayshire Railway was opened in 1852, worked by the Great North from 1863 when the extension to Craigellachie opened. The Great North of Scotland Railway (Amalgamation) Act 1866 (29 & 30 Vict. c. cclxxxviii) provided for the merging of the two companies when terms where agreed, and the companies were merged in 1880.

== Key people ==
=== Chairmen ===
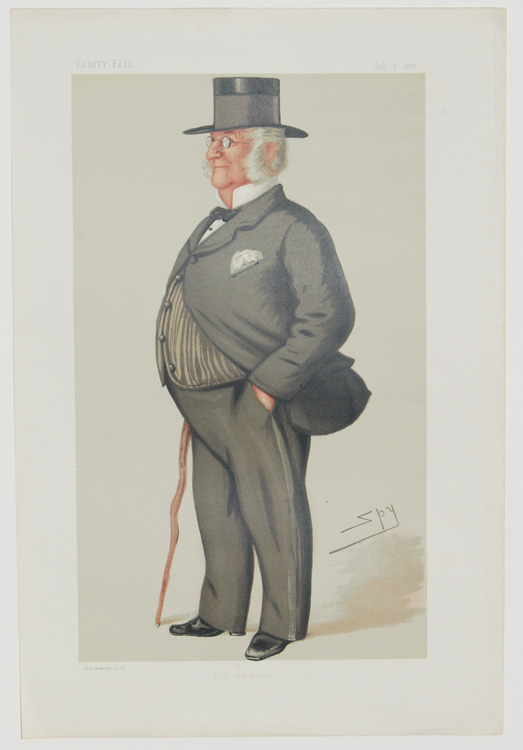
"The Admiral" James Dalrymple-Horn-Elphinstone. Caricature by Spy published in Vanity Fair in 1878

- James Dalrymple-Horn-Elphinstone 1846 - 1866
- John Duncan 1866 - 1871
- Lord Provost Leslie 1871 - 1879
- William Ferguson 1879 - 1904
- David Stewart 1904 - 1919
- Andrew Bain 1919 - 1922

=== General Managers ===
- Robert Milne 1856 - 1880
- William Moffatt 1880 - 1906
- George Davidson 1906 - 1923

=== Chief civil engineers ===
- Benjamin Hall Blyth 1852 - 1856
- William Crabb until 1861
- Alexander Fraser 1862 - 1867
- Patrick Moir Barnett 1867 - 1906
- James Alexander Parker 1906 - 1923

=== Locomotive superindendents ===
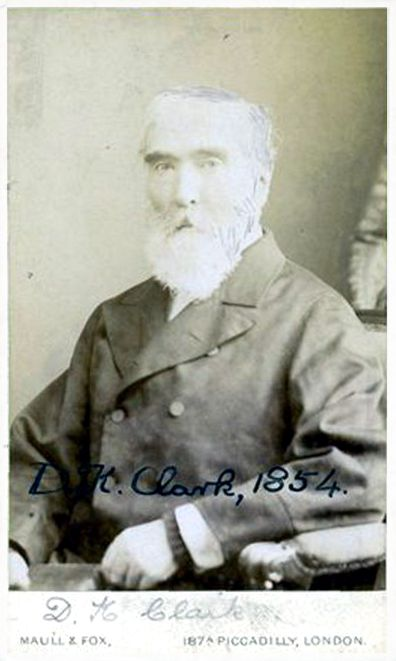
Daniel Kinnear Clark in 1854

- Daniel Kinnear Clark 1853 - 1855
- John Folds Ruthven 1855 - 1857
- William Cowan 1857 - 1883
- James Manson 1883 - 1890 (afterwards locomotive superintendent of the Glasgow and South Western Railway)
- James Johnson 1890 - 1894
- William Pickersgill 1894 - 1914 (formerly Norwich district locomotive superintendent of the Great Eastern Railway, afterwards locomotive superintendent of the Caledonian Railway)
- Thomas Edward Hett Heywood 1914 - 1923 (formerly assistant locomotive superintendent of the Taff Vale Railway)

== Notes and references ==
=== Books ===
- Awdry, Christopher (1990). Encyclopaedia of British Railway Companies. Wellingborough: Patrick Stephens Ltd. ISBN 1-85260-049-7.
- Butt, R. V. J. (1995). The Directory of Railway Stations: Details every public and private passenger station, halt, platform and stopping place, past and present (1st ed.). Patrick Stephens Ltd. ISBN 1-85260-508-1.
- Barclay-Harvey, Malcolm (1998) [1950]. A History of the Great North of Scotland Railway (2nd ed.). Ian Allan. ISBN 978-0-7110-2592-9.
- Fraser, G.M. (1927). Historic Walks and Names. D. Wyllie & Son.
- Pratt, Edwin A (1921). British Railways and the Great War; Organisation, Efforts, Difficulties and Achievements. Selwyn & Blount.
- Jackson, Alan (1992). The Railway Dictionary: An A-Z of Railway Terminology. Sutton Publishing. ISBN 0-7509-0038-5.
- Rush, R.W (1971). British Steam Railcars. Oakwood Press. ISBN 0-85361-144-0.
- Thomas, John; Turnock, David (1993). The North of Scotland. A Regional History of the Railways of Great Britain Vol. 15 (2nd ed.). David St John Thomas. ISBN 0-946537-03-8.
- Vallance, H.A.; Clinker, C.R. (1971). The Highland Railway. Pan Macmillan. ISBN 978-0-330-02720-5.
- Vallance, H. A. (27 June 1991). Great North of Scotland Railway. The History of the Railways of the Scottish Highlands Vol. 3. David St John Thomas. ISBN 978-0-946537-60-0.
