= Kennethmont railway station =

Disused railway station in Kennethmont, Aberdeenshire

Kennethmont
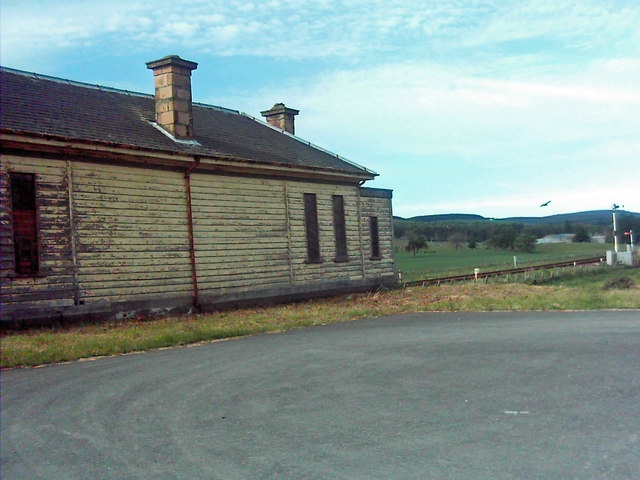
- The site of the station in 2007

General information
- Location: Kennethmont, Aberdeenshire; Scotland
- Coordinates: 57.3524°N 2.7429°W
- Grid reference: NJ553293
- Platforms: 2

Other information
- Status: Disused

History
- Original company: Great North of Scotland Railway
- Pre-grouping: Great North of Scotland Railway
- Post-grouping: LNER

Key dates
- 20 September 1854: Opened
- 6 May 1968: Closed
Location

Kennethmont railway station served the village of Kennethmont, Aberdeenshire, Scotland from 1854 to 1968 on the Great North of Scotland Railway.

== History ==
The station opened on 20 September 1854 by the Great North of Scotland Railway. The station closed to both passengers and goods traffic on 6 May 1968.

Preceding station	Historical railways	Following station
Wardhouse; Line open, station closed	Great North of Scotland Railway	Gartly; Line open, station closed
