= Inverury and Old Meldrum Junction Railway =

Railway company in Aberdeenshire, Scotland

Old Meldrum

General information
- Location: Old Meldrum, Aberdeenshire; Scotland
- Coordinates: 57.334°N 2.328°W

Other information
- Status: Disused

History
- Original company: Inverury and Old Meldrum Junction Railway
- Pre-grouping: Great North of Scotland Railway

Key dates
- 26 June 1856 (ceremonial) 1 July 1856 (public): opened
- 2 November 1931: closed for passengers
- 1966: closed completely
Location

The Inverury and Old Meldrum Junction Railway was a railway company in Aberdeenshire, Scotland, that opened a short branch line between the places in its name. (The spelling has been changed over the years.) It was built by local people to revive the fortunes of a market town that had declined, and it opened in 1856. The railway was a commercial failure, and it was soon leased to the larger Great North of Scotland Railway (GNoSR), and it was absorbed by the GNoSR in 1866.

Road vehicle competition worsened the railway's already weak position and in 1931 the passenger service was discontinued. In 1966 the branch line was completely closed down.

== Background ==
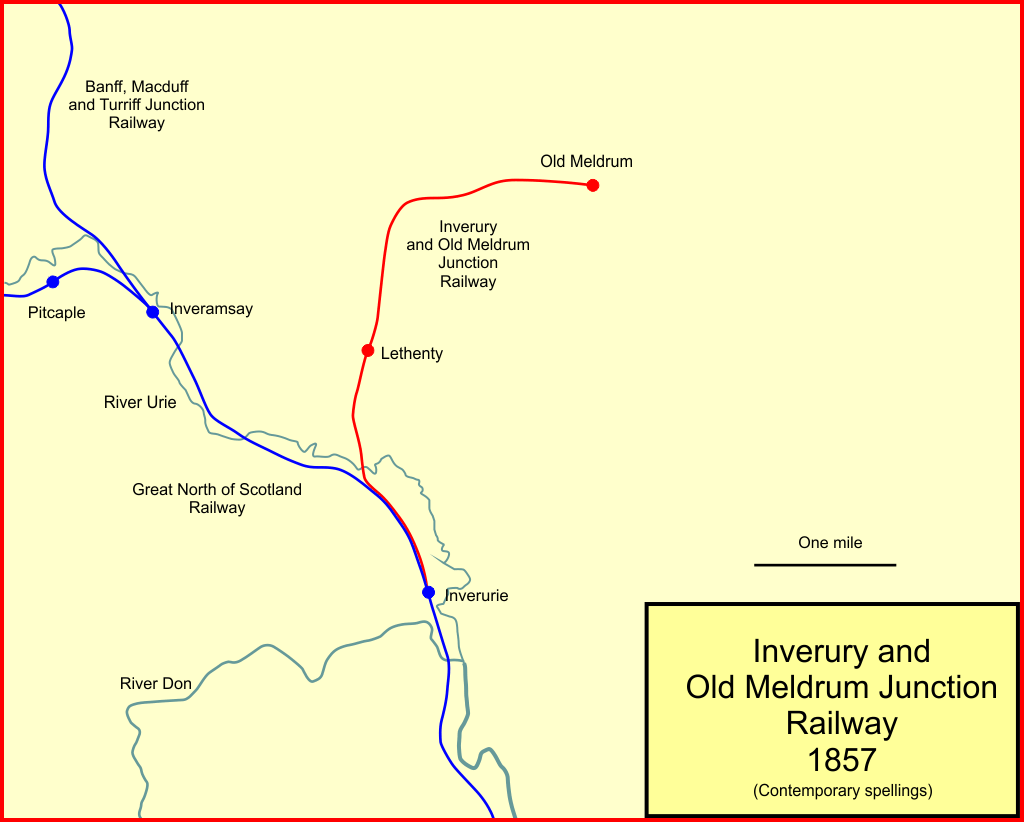
The Inverury and Old Meldrum Railway

Until the turn of the 18th century Oldmeldrum – then written Old Meldrum – was the principal market town between Aberdeen and Banff. However, the importance of Old Meldrum declined with the building of a canal between Aberdeen and Port Elphinstone, on the River Don at Inverurie. (Note: Ross (2015) explains (page 83) that the town's name was then spelt Inverury: the town council later became exasperated with mail being sent to Inveraray in Argyll and Bute by mistake, and it decided in April 1866 to change its town's name to Inverurie.) Whereas goods had been transported by road via Oldmeldrum and the small port of Newburgh at the mouth of the River Ythan, trade increasingly concentrated on Inverurie and its canal link with Aberdeen. By 1850, Inverurie was almost twice the size of Oldmeldrum: Oldmeldrum's population was 2,343 in 1861.

When railways came to the north-east of Scotland in the 1840s, the Great North of Scotland Railway (GNoSR) opened its main line from Aberdeen to Huntly in 1854. It was already plain that small towns not connected to the railway network would suffer a decline, and the people of Oldmeldrum saw that a link to the GNoSR was essential. Ideas put forward at this stage included ambitious plans to extend much further north than Oldmeldrum, but it was realised that the money for a long line was not easily raised.

== Authorisation and opening ==
Inverury and Old Meldrum Junction Railway Act 1855
- Act of Parliament
- Parliament of the United Kingdom
- Long title: An Act for making a Railway from and out of the Great North of Scotland Railway in the Parish of Inverury to the Town of Old Meldrum, all in the County at Aberdeen; and for other Purposes.
- Citation: 18 & 19 Vict. c. lxv

Dates
- Royal assent: 15 June 1855

Text of statute as originally enacted

A more modest scheme, the Inverury and Old Meldrum Junction Railway was promoted; its necessary capital was £22,000, and the GNoSR promised a moderate contribution. The authorising act of Parliament for the Inverury and Old Meldrum Junction Railway, the Inverury and Old Meldrum Junction Railway Act 1855 (18 & 19 Vict. c. lxv) received royal assent on 15 June 1855.

That it shall be lawful for the Company to make and maintain the Railway and Works herein-after mentioned, with all proper Stations, Approaches, Works, and Conveniences connected therewith; (that is to say,)

- A Railway commencing by a Junction with the Main Line of the Great North of Scotland Railway at a Point on the said Railway distant about Three hundred Yards North from the Point where the said Railway crosses the Forgue or Inverury and Forgue Turnpike Road in the Parish of Inverury in the County of Aberdeen, and proceeding thence in, through, and into the several Parishes and Places following, or some of them, (that is to say,) the united Parishes of Keith-hall and Kinkell, the Parishes of Chapel of Garioch, Bourtie, Daviot, and Meldrum, all in the County of Aberdeen, and terminating in or near a Field numbered 50 in the Parish of Old Meldrum upon the Plans deposited as herein-after mentioned, belonging to Beauchamp Colclough Urquhart of Meldrum and Byth, Esquire, in the Occupation of John Webster and James Webster, or One of them, and situate at or near the Strathmeldrum Toll Bar upon the Sheelagreen Turnpike Road in the said Parish of Meldrum.

— Section 22, Inverury and Old Meldrum Junction Railway Act 1855 (18 & 19 Vict. c. lxv)

The line was to be 5 miles 1194 yards in length, from a junction at Inverurie. The station at that time was some distance south of the present one; the Oldmeldrum branch line ran alongside the main line for nearly a mile before diverging. The engineer was John Willet. There were few engineering complications in constructing the line, the biggest work being a 50-foot girder bridge over the River Ury.

The capital for construction seems to have been raised mainly locally, and so construction was completed quickly and cheaply, being ready by June 1856 at a low cost of about £5,000 per mile. Colonel Yolland carried out the necessary inspection for the Board of Trade on 23 June 1856. Everything was satisfactory and a ceremonial opening to passengers took place on Thursday 26 June 1856.

The ordinary passenger train service started on 1 July 1856, followed by the goods service on 6 July. The Great North of Scotland Railway worked the line, at cost plus 50% of net receipts.Barclay-Harvey (1949), p. 41 There was an intermediate station at Lethenty, opened on 1 November 1856; a platform halt was established at Fingask, where there were wool-carding mills, in 1866. (Note: McLeish (2014) suggests an alternative for the intermediate station: on page 10 he says "In the early days trains also called at Muirtown, halfway between the farms of Muirtown and Fingask, and almost three miles from Inverurie, where Mr Manson, the vice-chairman of the erstwhile Oldmeldrum company lived. By 1867, trains called instead at Fingask, a simple platform half a mile further on." In a table on page 79 McLeish quotes a National Grid reference for Muirtown at NJ 773 263, a location nearer Inverurie where the line has turned south and a long lane from Muirtown meets the railway. However he does not state opening and closing dates for "Muirtown", and does not give any source for the assertion.)

At first the train service consisted of three trains each way, although this service was enhanced later. There was never a Sunday service. The main business at Lethenty was goods traffic from a meal mill. Goods traffic outwards was chiefly agricultural produce: oats, potatoes, milk, livestock and milled grain. There was a distillery at Glen Garioch distillery, which generated inward traffic of malt, barley, coal and wood for barrels, as well as transport of the finished product. Coal was brought in to Oldmeldrum for domestic users and for the gasworks, and fertiliser and cattle were brought in for agricultural purposes.

== Financial performance ==
At the company's second ordinary general meeting on 27 October 1856, the directors reported that £16,704 13s 9d of capital had been expended, although only £12,722 10s of the authorised capital of £22,000 had actually been raised in shares. Borrowing powers of £7,000 had not yet been exercised, and "they hoped for further share purchases". There is no explanation of where the missing £3,982 had come from.

Inverury and Old Meldrum Junction Railway Lease Act 1858
- Act of Parliament
- Parliament of the United Kingdom
- Long title: An Act for vesting the Inverury and Old Meldrum Junction Railway by way of Lease in the Great North of Scotland Railway Company; and for other Purposes.
- Citation: 21 & 22 Vict. c. xlv

Dates
- Royal assent: 14 June 1858

The financial performance of the company was poor, and no dividend was ever paid. The company had only raised £14,700 of its authorised capital of £22,000. The company leased its line to the GNoSR from 1 September 1857, the lease charge was £650. The local company was also allowed to issue £10,500 worth of preference shares against the security of the lease charge, to clear the debt. The GNoSR obtained a retrospective act authorising the lease, the Inverury and Old Meldrum Junction Railway Lease Act 1858 (21 & 22 Vict. c. xlv); this got royal assent on 14 June 1858. In a GNoSR shareholders' meeting to get approval for the lease, Sir James Elphinstone, Chairman of the GNoSR, was rather dismissive of the Old Meldrum company and its line:

"We work it at prime cost, and I don't think the shareholders get much by it. We did not make the line, as we did not think it important to the district, but they were anxious to have it, and they work it on their own basis."

In 1866 the GNoSR set about incorporating several branch line leases into the parent company; the Oldmeldrum company was one of them. The £650 annual lease rental was converted to £13,810 of new GNoSR Old Meldrum preference stock. Parliament authorised the change in the Great North of Scotland Railway (Amalgamation) Act 1866 (29 & 30 Vict. c. cclxxxviii). Ordinary shareholders got £3 of GNoSR stock for their £10 shares.

A report of 1903 into twelve months' finances to 31 July 1903 indicated that the branch carried 54,012 passenger journeys, producing income of £912, and 589 trucks of livestock and goods and minerals, accounting for 65,962 tons, and income of £1,415. This left a surplus of about £500, representing an operating ratio of 81%, or 2.18% on the initial investment.

This contrasts with an earlier 1870 report, in which running expenses were said to amount to £350 per annum, while station expenses came to about £250. The total income at Oldmeldrum and Lethenty was £4,935. These figures may not be comparable and should be treated with caution.

== Decline ==
After 1919, road services became an important competitor for the branch line; at first passenger buses operated, but soon afterwards goods lorries too. Usage of the branch line fell considerably, and in turn this led to a reduction in the train service to two passenger trains each way. Following the Railways Act 1921 the London and North Eastern Railway (LNER) absorbed the GNoSR and other companies. In 1930 passenger receipts had totalled £243, which represented a loss in working of £718. It was hardly sustainable to continue such an operation, and the LNER closed the passenger service from 2 November 1931.

The basic goods service to Oldmeldrum continued, but it too became unsupportable in the 1960s, and it was closed on 3 January 1966. It was later used for a while for wagon storage.

== Meldrum Meg ==
The branch's passenger train ranked high in the affection of the locals, who bestowed the sobriquet of "Meldrum Meg" on the branch engine, which at first was a Samuel tank it had acquired from the Morayshire railway. The Inverurie poet Dufton Scott had referred to it in one of his readings as "Meldrum Meg". From then on, every engine was known by this name.

Its loss was lamented in the following verse:

Meldrum Meg has gone at last
An' her racing days are past
Nae mair ye’ll hear me sing the auld refrain
So I think that me an' you
Should drink her health in mountain dew
For we’ll never see anither like the Meldrum Train

== Locations ==
- Old Meldrum; opened 1 July 1856; renamed Oldmeldrum 1894; closed 2 November 1931;
- Fingask; opened 1 June 1866; closed 2 November 1931;
- Lethenty; opened 1 October 1856; closed 2 November 1931;
- Inverury; Great North of Scotland main line station; renamed Inverurie 1 May 1866; relocated half mile further north 10 February 1902; still open.

== Bibliography ==
- Barclay-Harvey, Malcolm (1949). A History of the Great North of Scotland Railway (2nd ed.). The Locomotive Publishing Company.
- Grant, Donald J. (2017). Directory of the Railway Companies of Great Britain. Kibworth Beauchamp: Matador. ISBN 978-1785893-537.
- McLeish, Duncan (2014). Rails to Banff, Macduff and Oldmeldrum: Three Great North of Scotland Railway Branch Lines. Great North of Scotland Railway Association. ISBN 978-0902343-26-9.
- Ross, David (2015). The Great North of Scotland Railway: A New History. Catrine: Stenlake Publishing. ISBN 978-1-84033-701-3.
- Thomas, John; Turnock, David (1989). A Regional History of the Railways of Great Britain. Vol. 15, North of Scotland. Newton Abbot: David and Charles. ISBN 0-946537-03-8.
- Vallance, H. A. (1965). The Great North of Scotland Railway. Dawlish: David and Charles.
