= William Ferguson of Kinmundy =

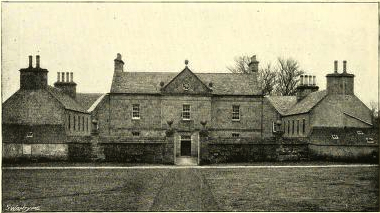
Kinmundy House, Aberdeenshire (demolished 1950s)

William Ferguson LL.D. (1823-1904) was chairman of the Great North of Scotland Railway from 1879 until 1904.

== Life ==
He was born on 21 December 1823, the son of James Ferguson (1789-1862) and Emily Chalmers (b.1795)

He was educated at Aberdeen University from 1838 but forced to leave before the completion of his education due to family financial pressures.

He entered into the business world first in the offices of Messrs Ferguson, Davidson and Company, timber merchants of Leith, and afterwards in Glasgow with various firms, chiefly engaged in the Levant and East India trades, following his brother who was also an engineer. Sadly his elder brother was accidentally killed, and left William as the heir to his family properties.

In 1852 to moved to Liverpool and in March 1854 became a partner in the form of Robert Benson and Co, bankers of America and general merchants. Later he became a partner in Cropper, Ferguson and Co., which he became sole partner in until 1872. He then moved back north and lived in Kinmundy House until the rest of his life.

In 1879 he became the chairman of the Great North of Scotland Railway, a position he retained until his death.

He died on 11 September 1904 and was buried in Old Deer Churchyard, Aberdeenshire.

== Family ==
He married Eliza Williamson on 22 July 1856 in Ayr, Scotland. They had the following children:

- (Colonel) James Ferguson (1857-1917)
- Andrew Williamson Ferguson (1858-1864)
- Agnes Adair Ferguson (1864 - 1941)
