= Fingask railway station =

Former railway station in Scotland

Fingask

General information
- Location: Fingask, Aberdeenshire; Scotland
- Coordinates: 57.3319°N 2.3690°W
- Grid reference: NJ778268
- Platforms: 1

Other information
- Status: Disused

History
- Original company: Inverury and Old Meldrum Junction Railway
- Pre-grouping: Great North of Scotland Railway

Key dates
- 1866: opened
- 2 November 1931: closed to passengers
Location

Fingask railway station, also known as Fingask Platform and later Fingask Halt, was a railway station in the Fingask area of Aberdeenshire, Scotland. It was situated on the short branch line of the Inverury and Old Meldrum Junction Railway between Inverurie and Oldmeldrum, and served Fingask Castle and the surrounding rural district.

== History ==
Originally known as "Fingask", it was formally designated "Fingask Platform" from 1907 to 1924 and finally "Fingask Halt" from 1924 to 1931. In the 1886 timetable, the designation was "Fingask Platform". It was one of only two intermediate stops on the line.

The station lay at 244 feet above sea level on a section of single track that, for down trains, presented a climb that was not especially challenging but was continuous. No signals or sidings were present and a gated minor road crossed the line giving passengers access. The short wooden platform lay on the northern side of the line in front of the Lochter Burn and had just a simple wooden shelter with a window and the name 'Fingask' on the front. A photograph appeared on 26 May 1926 in the Glasgow Bulletin and the articles title read "A Station Without a Staff".

A station had originally been provided at Muirtown, where the vice-chairman of the Oldmeldrum Company lived, half a mile away. By 1866, however, trains were calling at the new Fingask station. At first tickets were not issued for the station and passengers from Oldmeldrum had to pay a fare to Inverurie and vice versa.

The line itself remained open to freight until its official closure on 3 January 1966. Nothing now remains of the station and the trackbed is used to the west as a field access.

== Previous services ==
The 1866 timetable records that "Nos.1 and 6 Down and Nos.1, 3 & 6 Up Trains will stop at the platform. Other trains will stop only when a request by Passengers is made to the Guard at the Lethenty or Old Meldrum stations, or when passengers are upon the platform to be taken up." The line had no Sunday services. The last railtour to visit the line was in June 1965 with a two car DMU.

== The branchline ==
Preceding station	Historical railways	Following station
Lethenty; Line and Station closed	Great North of Scotland Railway; Inverury and Old Meldrum Junction Railway	Old Meldrum; Line and Station closed
