= Wardhouse railway station =

Disused railway station in Wardhouse, Aberdeenshire

Wardhouse
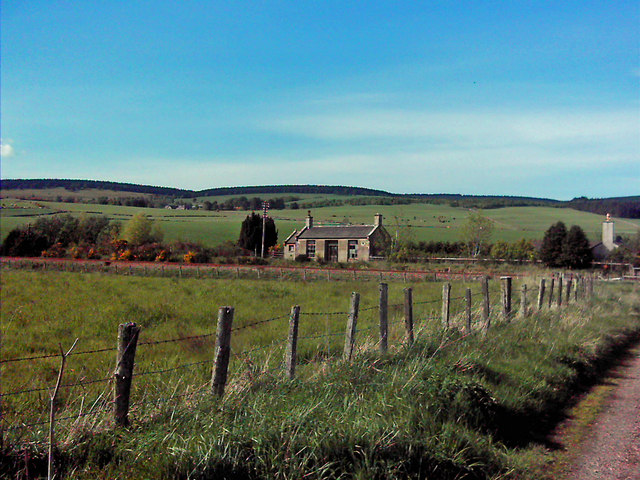
- The site of the station in 2007

General information
- Location: Wardhouse, Aberdeenshire; Scotland
- Coordinates: 57.355°N 2.7017°W
- Grid reference: NJ578296
- Platforms: 2

Other information
- Status: Disused

History
- Original company: Great North of Scotland Railway
- Pre-grouping: Great North of Scotland Railway
- Post-grouping: LNER

Key dates
- 1 December 1854: Opened
- 5 June 1961: Closed
Location

Wardhouse railway station served the area of Wardhouse, Aberdeenshire, Scotland from 1854 to 1961 on the Great North of Scotland Railway.

== History ==
The station opened on 1 December 1854 by the Great North of Scotland Railway. It was originally built for Pedro Carlos Gordon, who lived in a nearby mansion. A second platform was added in 1889. A gate box opened when the line was doubled in 1896. It became a full box in 1898, downgraded to a gate box in 1915, upgraded to a full box again in 1920 and demoted to a gate box in 1931. It closed to both passengers and goods traffic on 5 June 1961.

Preceding station	Historical railways	Following station
Insch; Line open, station open	Great North of Scotland Railway	Kennethmont; Line open, station closed
