= Old Meldrum railway station =

Former railway station in Scotland

Old Meldrum
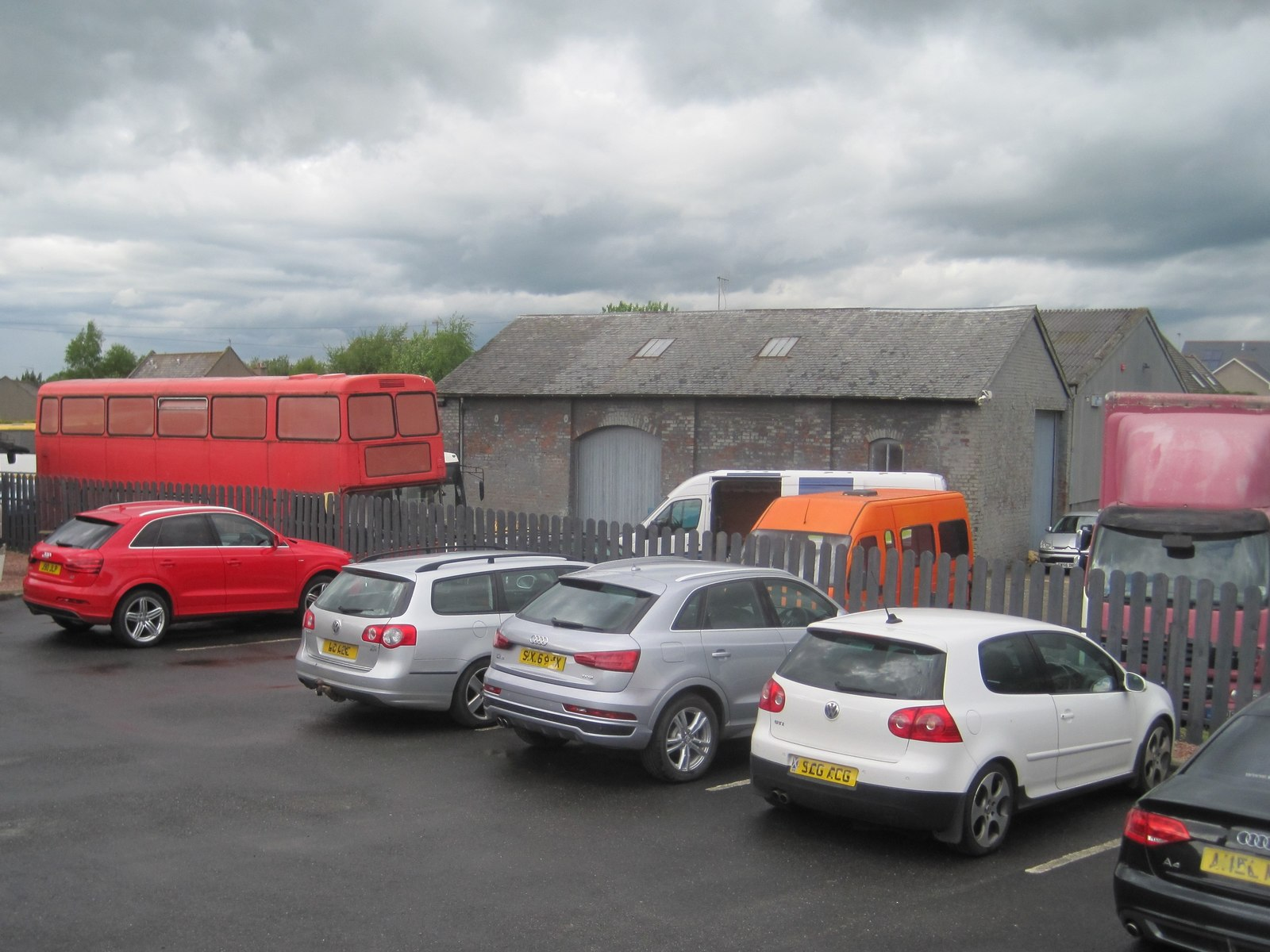
- The site of the station in 2017

General information
- Location: Old Meldrum, Aberdeenshire; Scotland
- Coordinates: 57.334°N 2.328°W

Other information
- Status: Disused

History
- Original company: Inverury and Old Meldrum Junction Railway
- Pre-grouping: Great North of Scotland Railway

Key dates
- 26 June 1856: opened
- 2 November 1931: closed for passengers
- 1966: closed completely
Location

Old Meldrum railway station was a railway station in Old Meldrum, Aberdeenshire. It was the terminus of the Inverury and Old Meldrum Junction Railway.

== History ==
In common with many other locations, the Oldmeldrum line did not actually enter the town it was intended to serve. The station was at Strathmeldrum, some 5 minutes walk downhill to the south from the main square. Then, it was surrounded by fields - with fine open views, particularly westwards to Bennachie's Mither Tap. Today, the station area is hemmed in on all sides, with housing to the north and east and a large industrial site on its southern and western boundaries.

Oldmeldrum station comprised a fine granite station house, an engine shed, a carriage shed, a range of goods sheds and the usual loading bay. There was a turntable, to meet the Board of Trade's requirement that engines did not run tender first. The turntable seems to have been a relatively short-lived installation and was removed in the 1880s. As with the turntable, the station was to lose its original station building, which was replaced by the present wooden structure in the early 1890s. It is a testament to the materials and workmanship that it remains in such generally good shape 120 years later. The roof structure is as pristine as the day it was erected. The design of this replacement followed the standard format for other GNSR stations - a good example of which can be seen on the Deeside line at Pitfodels Halt. Against these losses must be set the addition of a signal box in 1895 and the introduction of interlocked signalling and the telegraph.

Looking around the site today, whilst there is no trace of the signal box, it is still possible to gain a clear picture of what the complex looked like in its heyday, with not only the main station building on the platform, but also the goods loading platform and two of the sheds remain as shown by the attached photos. It is perhaps ironic that the main part of the site is now used by a bus company, since - as we shall see - it was to be the motorbus which led to the eventual withdrawal of passenger services from the town.

== Present day ==
The Oldmeldrum station building itself survived into the 21st century. The volunteers of the Royal Deeside Railway (a local heritage railway) conceived the idea of moving it for restoration as the station building at their Milton of Crathes. As of December 2012, the core of the building has been re-erected at the new site, the roof is on and restoration continues.

== Previous services ==
Preceding station	Historical railways	Following station
Fingask; Line and Station closed	Great North of Scotland Railway; Inverury and Old Meldrum Junction Railway	Terminus
