= Kingseat Hospital =

Kingseat Hospital may refer to:

- Kingseat Hospital (New Zealand), a former psychiatric hospital in New Zealand
- Kingseat Hospital, Aberdeenshire, a former psychiatric hospital in Scotland.
