= Esslemont =

Esslemont may refer to:

- Esslemont (surname)
- Esslemont railway station, railway station in Esslemont, Aberdeenshire
- Esslemont Castle, ruined tower house in Aberdeenshire, Scotland
