= Udny railway station =

Disused railway station in Udny, Aberdeenshire

Udny
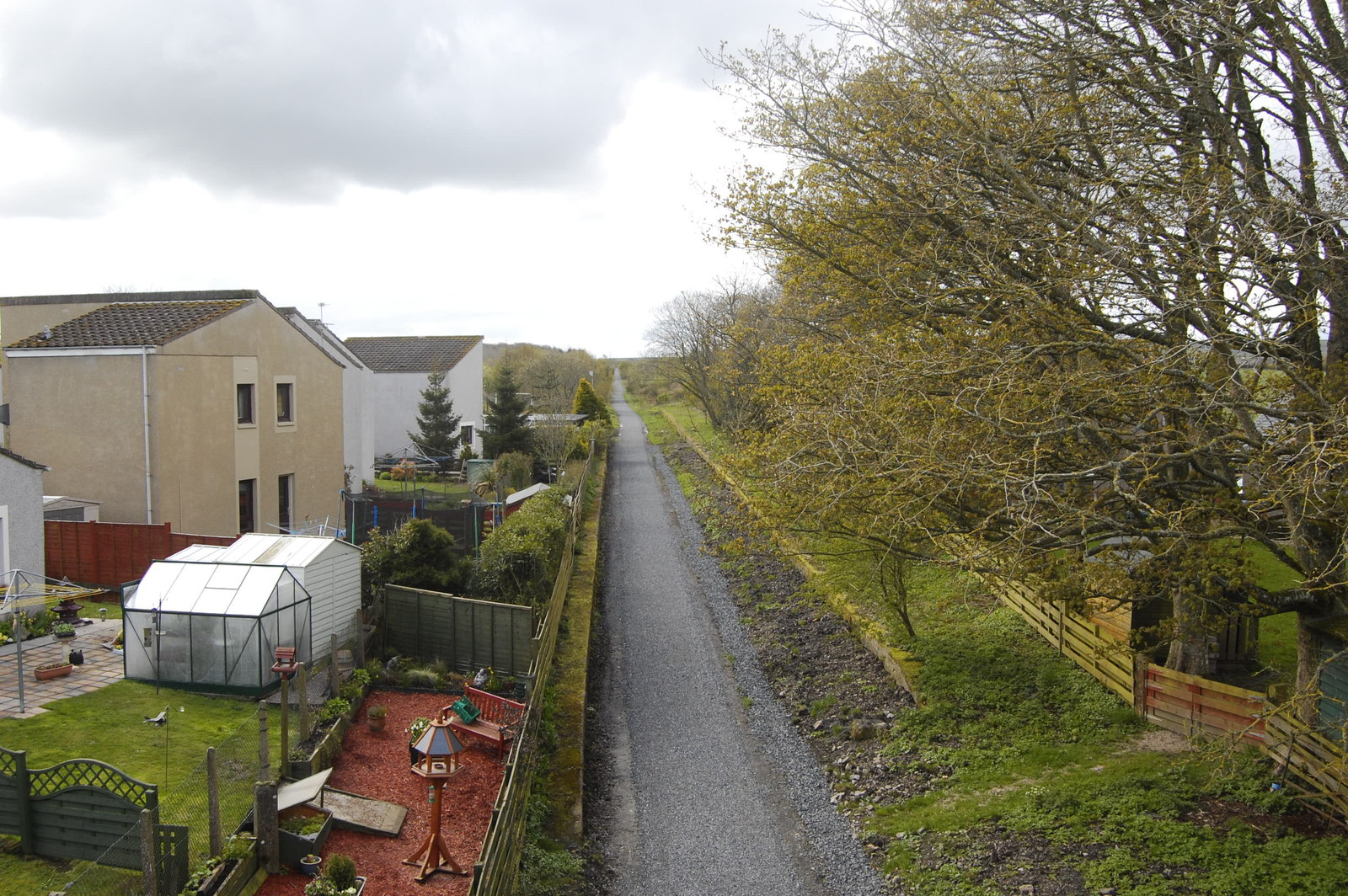
- The site of the station in 2012

General information
- Location: Udny, Aberdeenshire; Scotland
- Coordinates: 57.310°N 2.156°W
- Platforms: 2

Other information
- Status: Disused

History
- Original company: Formartine and Buchan Railway
- Pre-grouping: Great North of Scotland Railway
- Post-grouping: LNER

Key dates
- 18 July 1861: Opened
- 4 October 1965: Closed
Location

Udny railway station was a railway station serving the village of Udny in Aberdeenshire, Scotland. It was situated on the Formartine and Buchan Railway.

== History ==
The station was opened on 18 July 1861 by the Formartine and Buchan Railway. The station building was located on the southbound platform, while the goods yard and goods shed were situated on the east side. Two signal boxes were provided, one to the north and one to the south; both opened in 1890, although the northern box closed in 1901, with control transferred to the southern box. The station closed on 4 October 1965.

Preceding station	Disused railways	Following station
Newmachar; Line and station closed	Great North of Scotland Railway; Formartine and Buchan Railway	Logierieve; Line and station closed
