= Dale Stewart =

Dale Stewart may refer to:

- Dale Stewart (born 1979), South African bass guitarist, member of Seether
- Dale Stewart (filmmaker) (born 1985), New Zealand film director, producer, editor and screenwriter
