= Theodore Gray (psychiatrist) =

Theodore Grant Gray CMG (31 January 1884 – 8 September 1964) was a New Zealand psychiatrist and mental health administrator.

== Early life and education ==
Gray was born in Aberdeen, Aberdeenshire, Scotland, on 31 January 1884. He attended the University of Aberdeen graduating with his medical degree in 1906. His sister, Helen Gray, also trained in medicine and became a general practitioner in London.

== Career ==
Gray worked in general practice and at the Kingseat Asylum in Newmachar, later naming Kingseat Hospital in Auckland after the Scottish asylum. He arrived in New Zealand in 1911 to work in the Mental Hospitals Department holding positions at Porirua Mental Hospital, Auckland Mental Hospital and Seacliff Asylum under Truby King. During World War I, he served in France in the New Zealand Medical Corps of the New Zealand Expeditionary Force.

After the war, he became medical superintendent of the Nelson Mental Hospital from 1921 to 1925 when he became acting medical superintendent of the Auckland Mental Hospital. In 1927 he was appointed to succeed Truby King as director general of the Mental Hospitals a position he held until 1947. Gray undertook an overseas tour to nearly 100 institutions in 13 countries in 1927 to study the treatment and care of mentally ill patients. In his opinion, there was no known cure for the mentally ill apart from "fresh air, sunshine, suitable diet, recreation, rest and sleep". He adopted eugenicist views and wrote a report which recommended sterilisation, prevention of marriage, registration, screening and segregation of the mentally ill. He favoured the villa system of design of mental hospitals even though that system was already in use in New Zealand from the early 20th century. As such, he recommended the construction of small, detached blocks to accommodate patients. During his tenure, conditions in mental hospitals deteriorated to the point where a review was carried out in 1946; as a result, Gray resigned and left his position in 1947.

In the 1938 New Year Honours, Gray was appointed a Companion of the Order of St Michael and St George. He served in a number of organisations. He was president of the New Zealand Branch of the British Medical Association in 1947 (the first salaried officer and first psychiatrist to hold the role), the Parole Board, Nurses and Midwives Registration Board and the Medical Council.

Gray published his autobiography, The Very Error of the Moon, in 1959.

== Personal life ==
Gray married Catherine Amelia Sutherland in 1914, and they had three daughters and three sons.

Gray died in Wellington on 8 September 1964.
