= Kingseat, New Zealand =

Kingseat
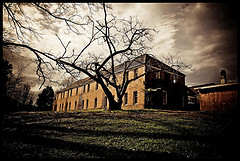
- Kingseat Hospital, now a tourist attraction called 'Spookers'
- Interactive map of Kingseat
- Coordinates: 37.128°S 174.801°E
- Country: New Zealand
- Region: Auckland Region
- Territorial authority: Auckland Council
- Ward: Franklin ward
- Board: Franklin Local Board
- Electorates: Papakura; Hauraki-Waikato

Government
  - Territorial Authority: Auckland Council
  - Mayor of Auckland: Wayne Brown
  - Papakura MP: Vacant
  - Hauraki-Waikato MP: Hana-Rawhiti Maipi-Clarke

Area
  - Total: 9.28 km^{2} (3.58 sq mi)

Population (June 2025)
  - Total: 500
  - Density: 54/km^{2} (140/sq mi)
- Postcode: 2580
- Area code: 09

Kingseat is a rural community between Karaka and Waiuku located on the Manukau Harbour in Auckland, New Zealand.

== Development ==
Kingseat was originally part of Patumahoe and was not actually recognised as a specific area until a mental hospital known as Kingseat Hospital was built there in February 1931. The local area around it then became generally became known as Kingseat. While still predominantly rural, with dairy farms and thoroughbred studs, as of 2016 large blocks of land are being sold off for subdivision and commercial development. Local infrastructure is minimal, with the nearest shops being at Patumahoe (seven minutes away) or Karaka (ten minutes away).

== Demographics ==
Statistics New Zealand describes Kingseat as a rural settlement, which covers 9.28 km^{2} (3.58 sq mi) and had an estimated population of 500 as of June 2025, with a population density of 54 people per km^{2}. Kingseat is part of the larger Kingseat-Karaka statistical area.

Historical population
Year	Pop.	±% p.a.
2006	429	—
2013	471	+1.34%
2018	579	+4.22%
2023	489	−3.32%

Kingseat had a population of 489 in the 2023 New Zealand census, a decrease of 90 people (−15.5%) since the 2018 census, and an increase of 18 people (3.8%) since the 2013 census. There were 234 males, 255 females and 3 people of other genders in 174 dwellings. 3.1% of people identified as LGBTIQ+. The median age was 38.4 years (compared with 38.1 years nationally). There were 114 people (23.3%) aged under 15 years, 75 (15.3%) aged 15 to 29, 252 (51.5%) aged 30 to 64, and 54 (11.0%) aged 65 or older.

People could identify as more than one ethnicity. The results were 70.6% European (Pākehā); 27.0% Māori; 8.0% Pasifika; 12.3% Asian; 3.1% Middle Eastern, Latin American and African New Zealanders (MELAA); and 2.5% other, which includes people giving their ethnicity as "New Zealander". English was spoken by 94.5%, Māori language by 4.9%, Samoan by 0.6%, and other languages by 14.7%. No language could be spoken by 2.5% (e.g. too young to talk). New Zealand Sign Language was known by 0.6%. The percentage of people born overseas was 19.0, compared with 28.8% nationally.

Religious affiliations were 25.8% Christian, 3.7% Māori religious beliefs, 1.2% Buddhist, 1.2% New Age, and 3.1% other religions. People who answered that they had no religion were 57.1%, and 9.8% of people did not answer the census question.

Of those at least 15 years old, 60 (16.0%) people had a bachelor's or higher degree, 198 (52.8%) had a post-high school certificate or diploma, and 120 (32.0%) people exclusively held high school qualifications. The median income was $41,100, compared with $41,500 nationally. 63 people (16.8%) earned over $100,000 compared to 12.1% nationally. The employment status of those at least 15 was that 198 (52.8%) people were employed full-time, 51 (13.6%) were part-time, and 21 (5.6%) were unemployed.
