= Parkhill railway station =

Disused railway station in Parkhill, Aberdeenshire

Parkhill
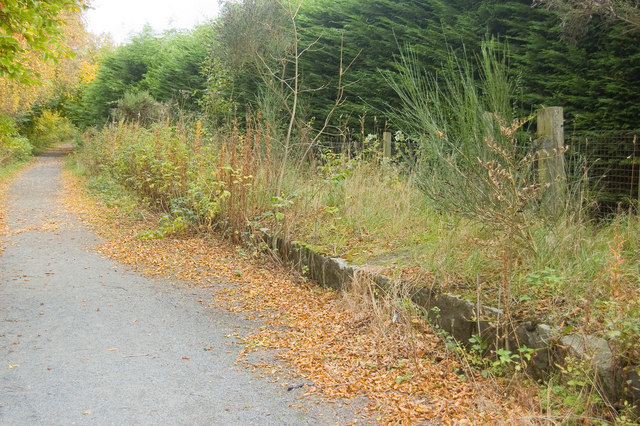
- The site of the station in 2008

General information
- Location: Parkhill, Aberdeenshire; Scotland
- Coordinates: 57.221°N 2.184°W
- Platforms: 1

Other information
- Status: Disused

History
- Original company: Formartine and Buchan Railway
- Pre-grouping: Great North of Scotland Railway
- Post-grouping: LNER

Key dates
- 18 July 1861: Opened
- 3 April 1950: Closed
Location

Parkhill railway station was a railway station in Parkhill, Aberdeenshire.

== History ==
The station was opened on 18 July 1861 by the Formartine and Buchan Railway. To the north was the goods yard and at the north end was the signal box, which was called Parkhill box and it opened in 1920. This closed in 1925, being replaced by a ground frame. The station closed to passengers on 3 April 1950.

Preceding station	Disused railways	Following station
Dyce; Line closed, station open	Great North of Scotland Railway; Formartine and Buchan Railway	Newmachar; Line and station closed
