= Kingseat, Aberdeenshire =

Coordinates: 57.262°N 2.159°W

Kingseat
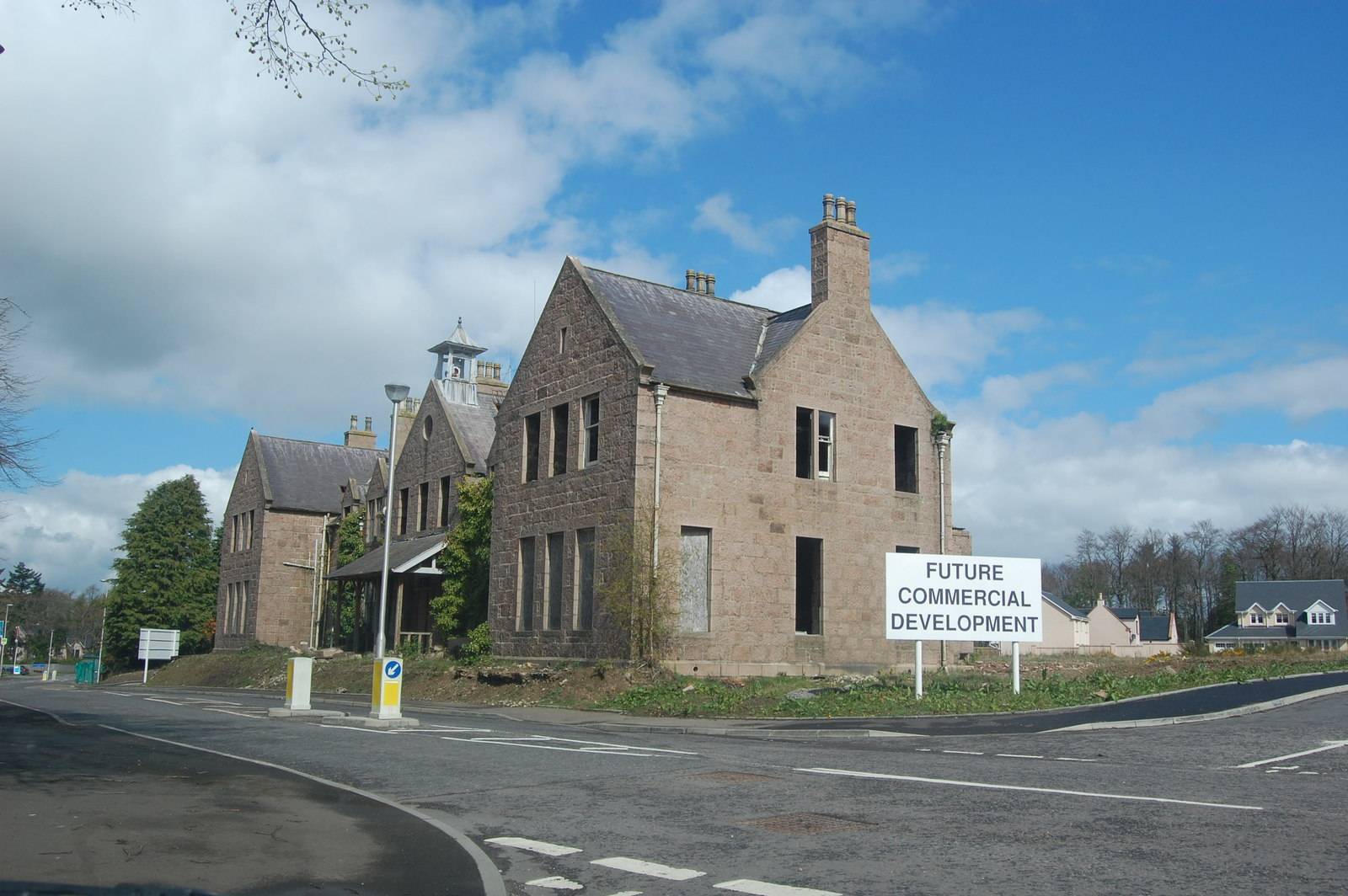
- Former Hospital Administration Building, Kingseat

- Location within Aberdeenshire
- Area: 0.2 sq mi (0.52 km^{2})
- Population: 830 (2020)
  - Density: 4,150/sq mi (1,600/km^{2})
- OS grid reference: NJ 904881
  - Edinburgh: 100 mi (160 km)
  - London: 406 mi (653 km)
- Council area: Aberdeenshire
- Lieutenancy area: Aberdeenshire
- Country: Scotland
- Sovereign state: United Kingdom
- Post town: Aberdeen
- Postcode district: AB21
- Dialling code: 01651
- Police: Scotland
- Fire: Scottish
- Ambulance: Scottish
- UK Parliament: Gordon and Buchan
- Scottish Parliament: Aberdeenshire East

Kingseat is a village in Aberdeenshire, Scotland, located about 10 miles (16 km) to the north-west of Aberdeen and 1 mile (1.6 km) east of Newmachar. It developed around the former Kingseat Hospital site, which has since been redeveloped for residential use.

== History ==
=== Etymology ===
The name Kingseat is traditionally said to derive from a local tradition that King Malcolm Canmore, following the slaying of Macbeth at the Battle of Lumphanan, rested on a stone at what was then Kingseat farm. Local accounts also record that water from a nearby well was so refreshing that the place became associated with the king. The name appears on maps dating back to at least the mid-17th century.

=== Kingseat Hospital ===
Designed by Marshall Mackenzie, Kingseat Hospital was the first segregate, or village, hospital system in the British Isles, opening in 1904.

During World War II it was requisitioned by the Admiralty to be used as a Naval Auxiliary Hospital which it functioned as until 28 February 1946.

The hospital closed in 1994 following a review of mental health institutions in the Grampian region. The concept of the Kingseat hospital system was later exported to New Zealand, where a mental hospital near Auckland was established with the same name.

=== Conservation & Residential Development ===
The site was designated a conservation area in 2000 and plans were made to preserve the buildings by converting the site in to residential buildings.

== Governance ==
Kingseat is part of the Gordon and Buchan county constituency for UK Parliament elections.

For Scottish elections Kingseat is part of the Aberdeenshire East constituency and part of the North East Scotland electoral region.

Kingseat is within the East Garioch ward which forms part of the Garioch administrative area of Aberdeenshire Council.

Newmachar Community Council represents the views of residents to Aberdeenshire Council and other public bodies. It has a statutory right to comment on all planning applications including all the major housing developments. The Council has nine elected members with elections held every three years.

Kingseat Community Association (an association brought around by the "Kingseat Matters" project which started in February 2013) held its first meeting on 18 June 2013 and the first committee meeting on 21 August 2013.. The group's aim is "to make Kingseat, Aberdeenshire an even better place to live and work." The group published a Kingseat Action Plan in 2014 and did a lot of work trying to force the site's main developers to finish the site's construction, they also organised various sports and community days. The group was dissolved in June 2020.

== Geography ==
Located 10 miles (16 km) NW of Aberdeen and 100 miles (160 km) NNE of Edinburgh Kingseat is roughly 1 mile (1.6 km) east of Newmachar connected by the B979 and a separate walking path. Newmachar providing many of the local amenities such as the school, church, local shop and pubs.

== Economy ==
Kingseat Business Park is located to the east end of Kingseat. It has 3 large office buildings, including the Newmachar Business Centre, and 3 smaller units (known as pavilions) housing a Dentist and Childcare.

== Culture and community ==
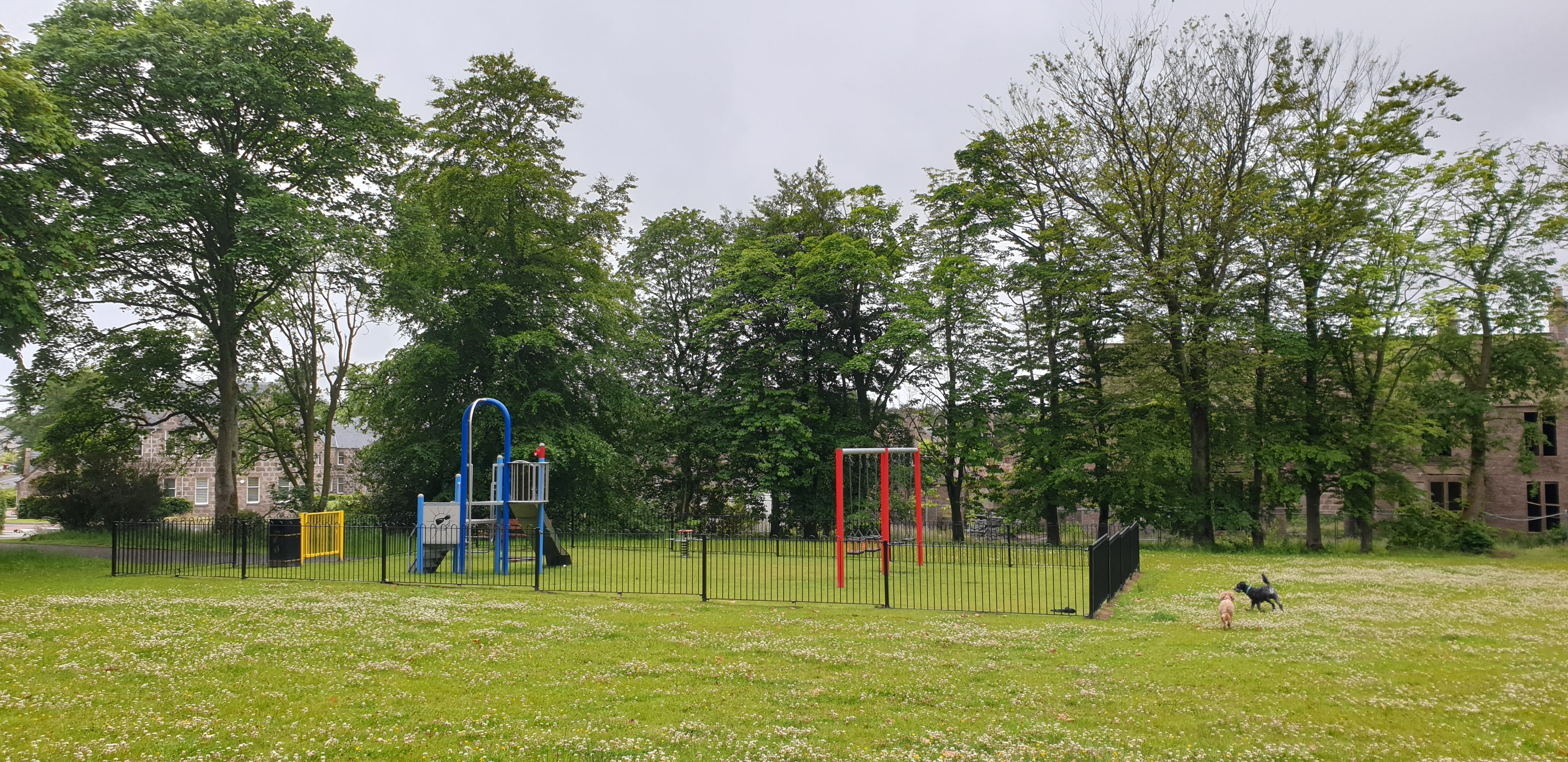
Kingseat Playpark

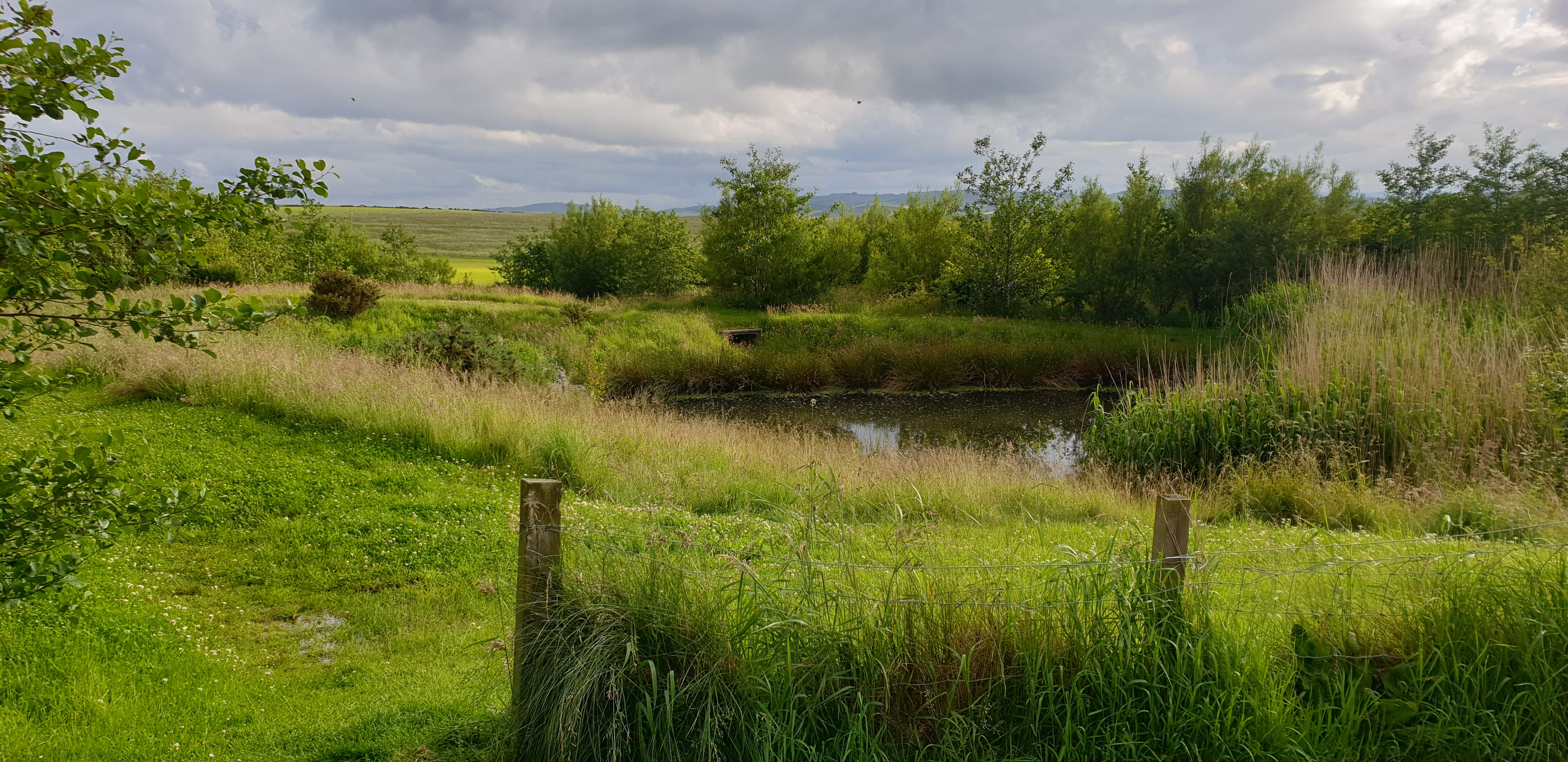
Kingseat Nature reserve

Kingseat has a small play park, nature reserve and plenty of green areas. The playpark took many years to develop due to problems with the sites developer. Finally Aberdeenshire Council stepped in to carry out the works to develop the playpark and provide further community park facilities. The council intend to recoup the costs from the developer.

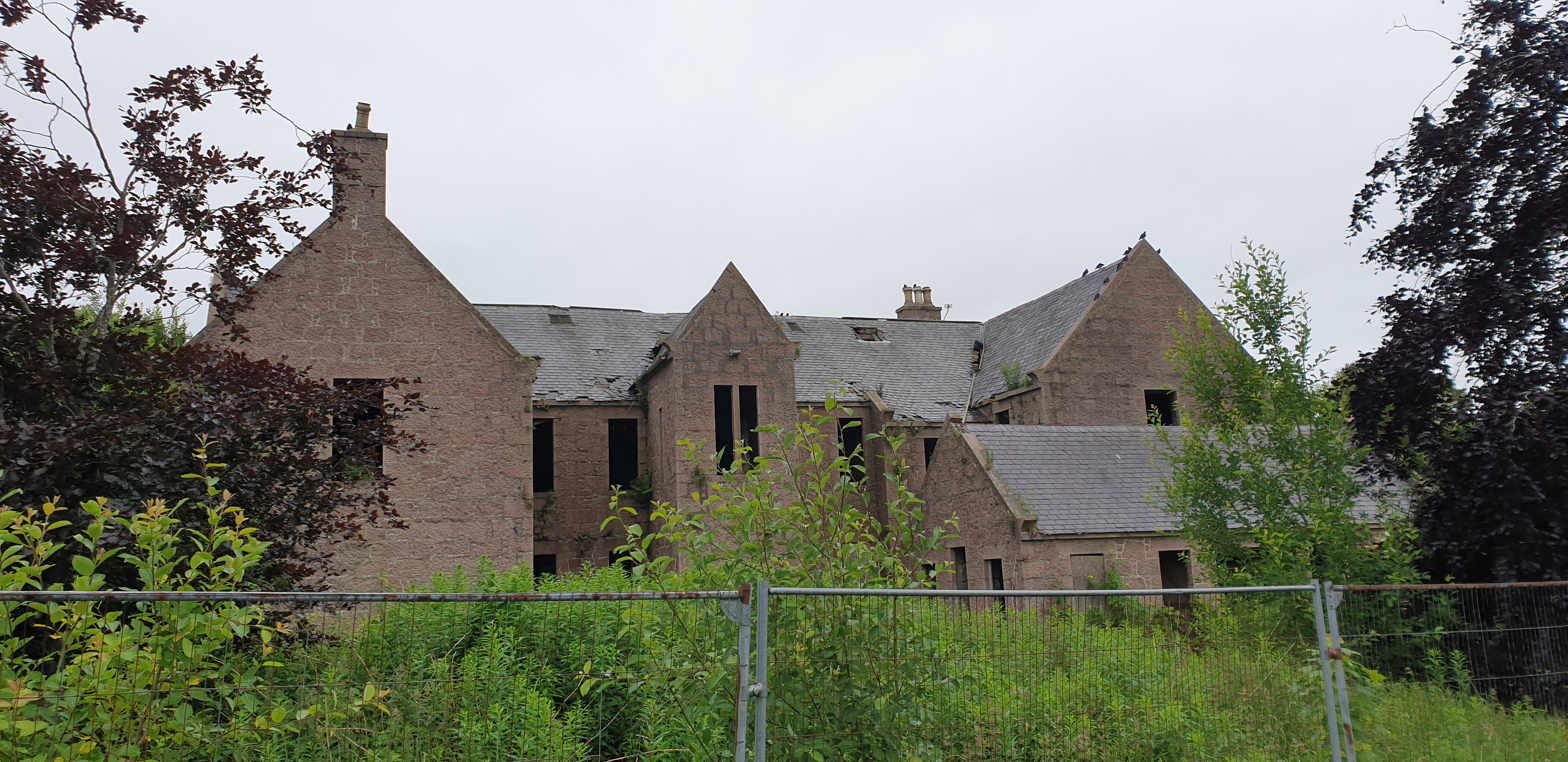
Kingseat Sibbald building

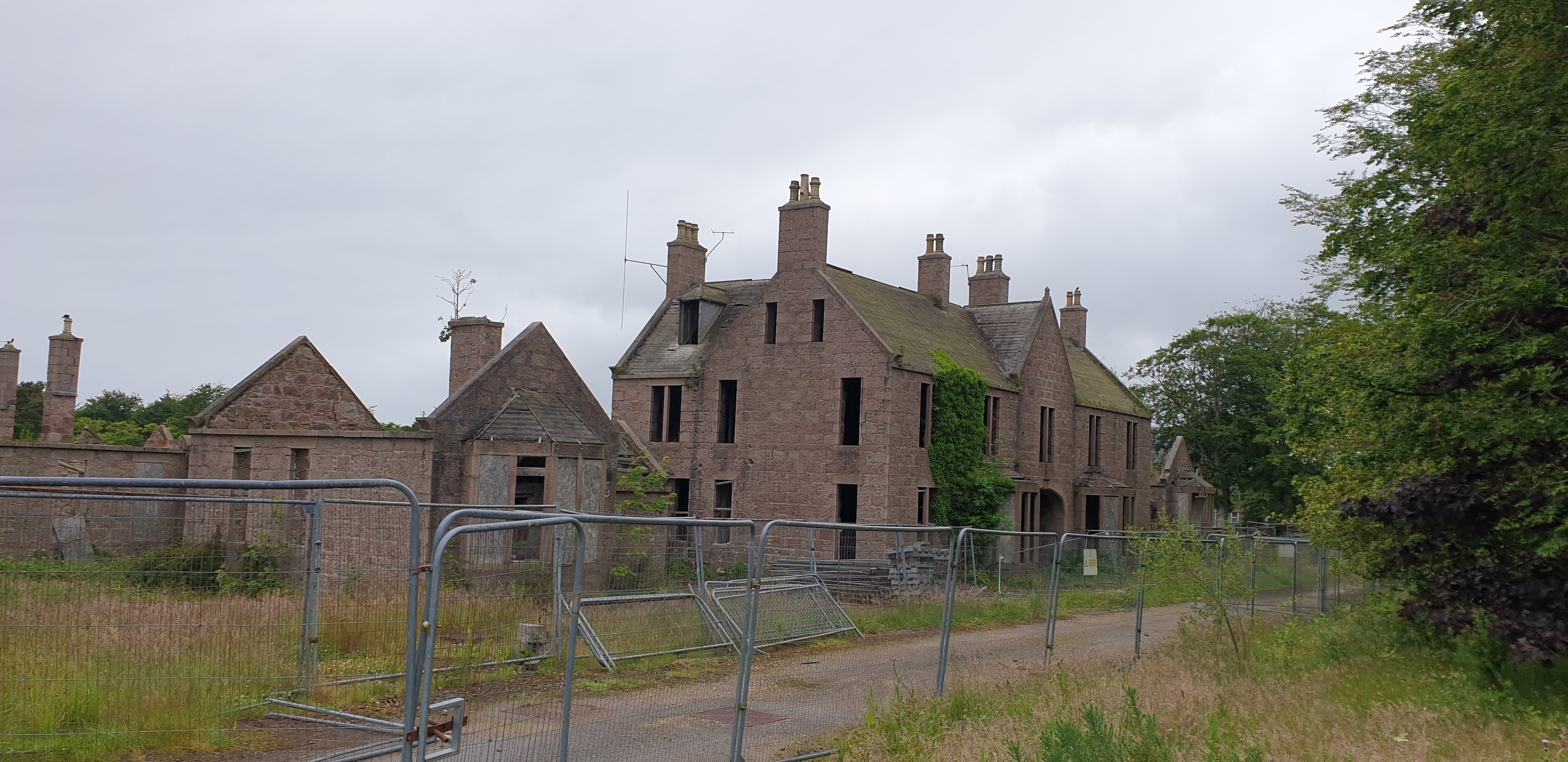
Kingseat Central Building with South West & East wards

Unfortunately the developer of the main site has also not completed major works on a number of the old hospital buildings. This has meant the community is without a village hall but more distressingly the buildings at the center of Kingseat are surrounded by wire fences and have been since the development began (c 2004).

== Sport ==
Kingseat Fieldsporters Club meeting regularly in the Kingseat woods during summer for clay pigeon shooting. They were formed on 13 August 1986 by a small band of enthusiasts at Kingseat Hospital. The club has been affiliated to the British Association for Shooting and Conservation since 1989.

There are plans to create two football pitches at the south end of Kingseat Avenue (currently fields) but these are yet to be developed.

When the site was still a village hospital it had a football pitch, tennis courts and bowling green.

== Education ==
There is a childcare business at the east end of the village catering for babies up to pre-schoolers.

The nearest primary school is short distance away in Newmachar and the nearest secondary school in Dyce.
