= Logierieve railway station =

Disused railway station in Logierieve, Aberdeenshire

Logierieve
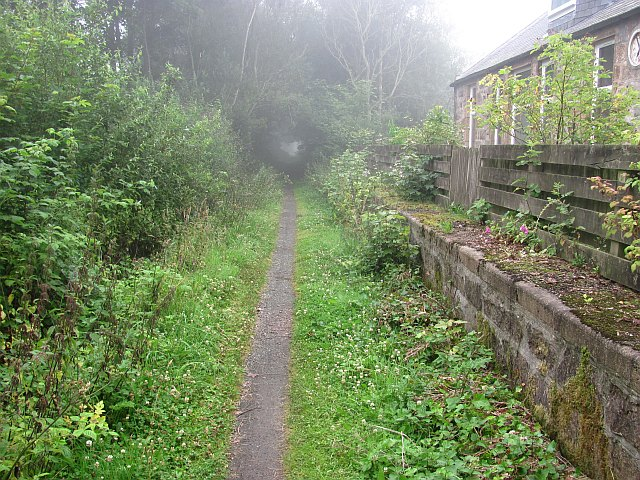

General information
- Location: Logierieve, Aberdeenshire; Scotland
- Coordinates: 57.333°N 2.133°W
- Platforms: 1

Other information
- Status: Disused

History
- Original company: Formartine and Buchan Railway
- Pre-grouping: Great North of Scotland Railway
- Post-grouping: LNER

Key dates
- 18 July 1861: Opened as Newburgh Road
- October 1862: Renamed to Logierieve
- 4 October 1965: Closed
Location
- Location within Aberdeenshire

Logierieve railway station was a railway station in the parish of Udny, Aberdeenshire, on the Formartine and Buchan Railway.

The station was beside the Oldmeldrum–Newburgh road (now the B9000), with the closest village being Pitmedden to the west.

== History ==
The station was opened on 18 July 1861, originally under the name Newburgh Road Station.

The name changed to Logierieve in October 1862. The station was near the Logierieve and North Logierieve farms.

In 1894, a traction engine had misjudged the rail overpass, and crashed onto the railway line blocking the tracks and took several hours to clear.

In 1955 the well-kept station was awarded a prize for its tidiness.

The station was closed on 4 October 1965 as a result of the Beeching cuts, and the line in 1979.

The station is now a private residence. The rail line is now a walking route.

Preceding station	Disused railways	Following station
Udny; Line and station closed	Great North of Scotland Railway; Formartine and Buchan Railway	Esslemont; Line and station closed
