= Newmachar railway station =

Disused railway station in Newmachar, Aberdeenshire

Newmachar
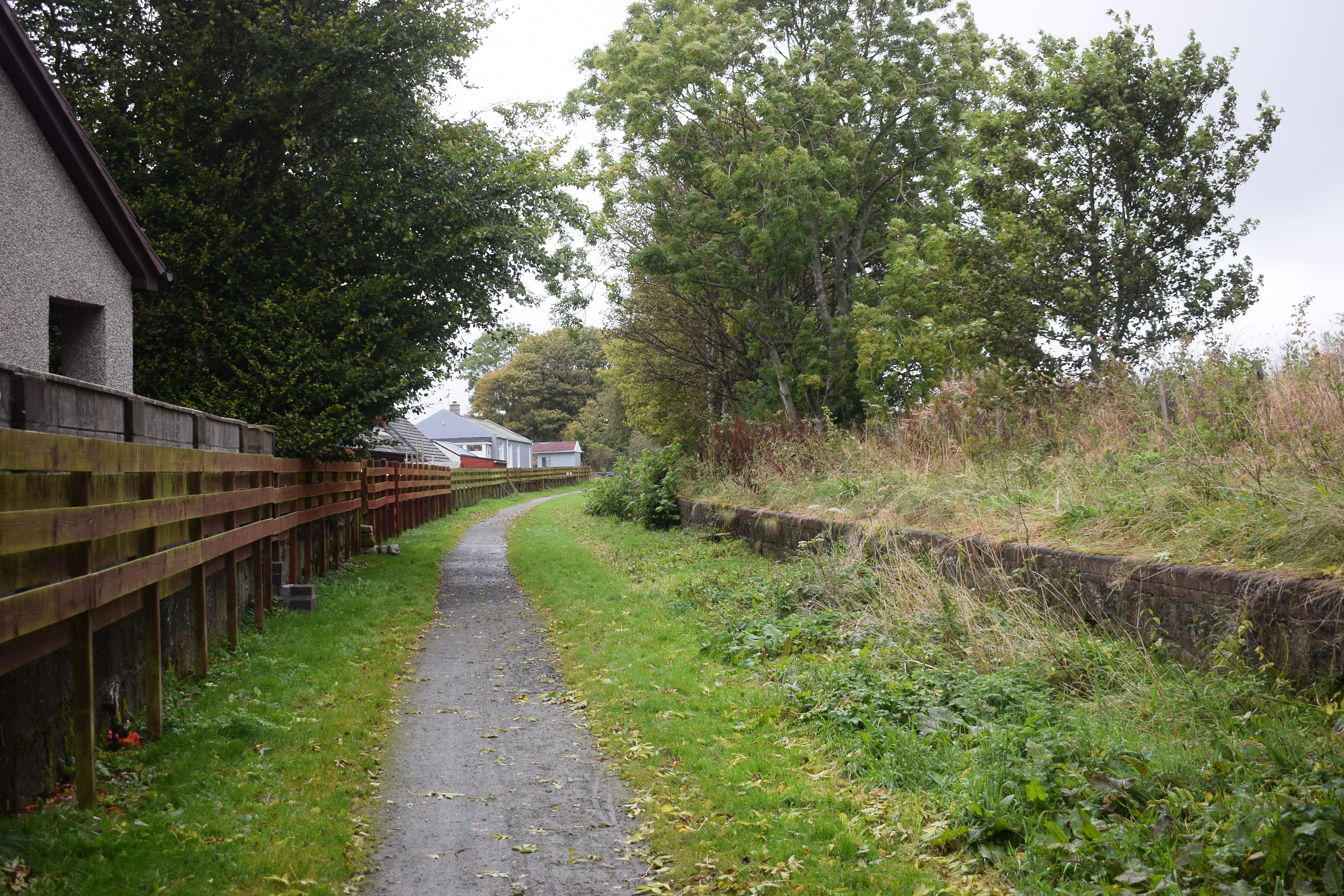
- Remains of the station

General information
- Location: Newmachar, Aberdeenshire; Scotland
- Coordinates: 57.272°N 2.185°W
- Platforms: 2

Other information
- Status: Disused

History
- Original company: Formartine and Buchan Railway
- Pre-grouping: Great North of Scotland Railway
- Post-grouping: LNER

Key dates
- 18 July 1861: Opened
- 4 October 1965: Closed
Location

Newmachar railway station was a railway station in Newmachar, Aberdeenshire which is now closed.

== History ==
The station was opened on 18 July 1861 by the Great North of Scotland Railway. On the northbound platform was the station building and on the west side was the goods yard. Two signal boxes opened in 1890: north and south were situated at each end of the northbound platform respectively. The station closed to passengers on 4 October 1965. The signal boxes closed along with it. The station was later bought by the local run 'Whytes Bus Coaches' in the mid-1980s, who relocated to their current location at Mill Pond, half a mile out of Newmachar.

Preceding station	Disused railways	Following station
Parkhill; Line and station closed	Great North of Scotland Railway; Formartine and Buchan Railway	Udny; Line and station closed
