= Newmachar =

Village in Aberdeenshire, Scotland

Coordinates: 57.267°N 2.192°W

Newmachar: Scottish Gaelic: Machar Nuadh
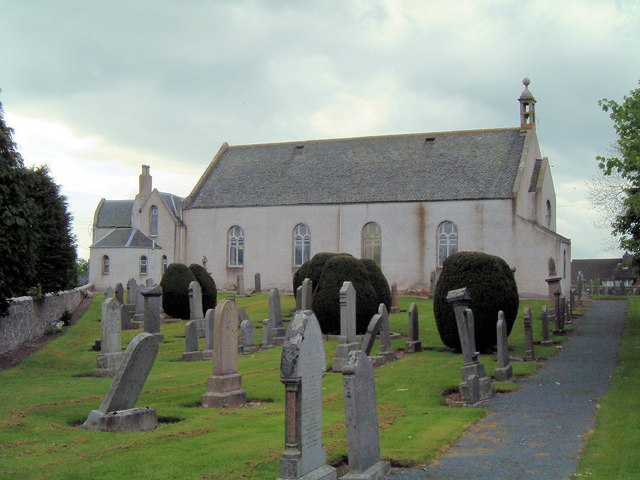
- New Machar Church

- Location within Aberdeenshire
- Area: 0.3 sq mi (0.78 km^{2})
- Population: 2,530 (2020)
  - Density: 8,433/sq mi (3,256/km^{2})
- OS grid reference: NJ 885195
  - Edinburgh: 100 mi (160 km)
  - London: 406 mi (653 km)
- Community council: Newmachar
- Council area: Aberdeenshire
- Lieutenancy area: Aberdeenshire
- Country: Scotland
- Sovereign state: United Kingdom
- Post town: Aberdeen
- Postcode district: AB21
- Dialling code: 01651
- Police: Scotland
- Fire: Scottish
- Ambulance: Scottish
- UK Parliament: Gordon and Buchan
- Scottish Parliament: Aberdeenshire East

Newmachar (Scots pronunciation: [njuˈmaxər]) is a village in Aberdeenshire, Scotland, about 10 miles (16 km) to the north-west of Aberdeen.

The settlement has a long history previously being known as Summerhill within the parish of New Machar, later being renamed Newmachar. Some buildings retain the split name "New Machar" to this day including the primary school and church.

The population, approximately 2,500., is served by one shop, two public houses, a primary school, a bowling club and, a football club.

== History ==
=== Etymology & History ===
The parish of New Machar (or "Newmachar") was formerly Monycabock (Misc. of the New Spalding Club, vol i, pp vii, 1850)). On 16 April 1343, the barony of "Monycabbok, Tullimaddin, and Craig" is granted by King David II to Donald Strathechin (Strachan), and Annabell (Crawford) his wife (RI, 48-34). This is the earliest known record referring to these lands.

The name originates from the original parish created in 1609, from part of the parish of St Machar's Cathedral. The name refers specifically to the village, originally known as Summerhill, with the surrounding parish being correctly known as New Machar.

In 1928, the name Summerhill was changed to Newmachar, which was also the name of the railway station serving the village.

=== Railways ===
The Newmachar railway station, on the Formartine and Buchan Railway, closed in 1965.

=== Auxiliary Units (World War II) ===
During World War II Winston Churchill initiated the forming of a British resistance force called Auxiliary Units. These units were put together in top secret, and were selected from areas that could be used to benefit from guerilla warfare. Typically, these units (called patrols) were made up from farmers, gamekeepers and estate workers. Newmachar had one of these patrols that were tasked with destroying the main railways to Inverness, and the Buchan line to Fraserburgh and Peterhead, also RAF Dyce and bridges over the River Don.

Research by C.A.R.T has revealed the patrol members and also the location of the Operational Base. The Operational Base was built underground to house up to 8 patrol members who, when the Invasion came would go into hiding for 7–14 days before coming out at night to attack "targets of opportunity", including assassinations of key individuals (both local and enemy personnel). Aux unit members had a life expectancy of up to 2 weeks after an invasion. All the members had to sign the official secrets act, and were trained at Blairmore House near Huntly. Auxiliary units were well armed with the latest weapons and conventional and booby trap explosives.

== Governance ==
Newmachar is part of the Gordon and Buchan county constituency for UK Parliament elections.

For Scottish elections Newmachar is part of the Aberdeenshire East constituency and part of the North East Scotland electoral region.

Newmachar is within the East Garioch ward which forms part of the Garioch administrative area of Aberdeenshire Council.

Newmachar Community Council represents the views of residents to Aberdeenshire Council and other public bodies. It has a statutory right to comment on all planning applications including all the major housing developments. The Council has nine elected member with elections held every three years.

== Geography ==
Newmachar is situated on the A947 between Dyce and Old Meldrum, 10 miles (16 km) NW of Aberdeen and 100 miles (160 km) NNE of Edinburgh. The main road (A947) bisects the village with most amenities (school, church, park, pub & hotel) to the East side of the road, the Aberdeenshire Local Development Plan currently proposes adding a distributor road to bypass the village to the north relieve traffic through the town centre.

Roughly 1 mile (1.6 km) to the east of Newmachar is the old Kingseat Hospital a former mental health facility with a village type layout, opened in May 1904 and closing in April 1994. The site has been designated a conversation area and many of the hospitals building have been redeveloped for residential use. The village of Kingseat is connected to Newmachar by the B979 and a separate walking path.

The village is on fairly level terrain at an elevation of 100 m, an elevation which proved challenging for the design of the old Formartine and Buchan Railway running to the Village. There are a number of springs and burns around the village notably Pinkie Burn to the SE and the longer Burn of Straloch to the SW, these both run south in to Goval Burn which joins the River Don at Dyce.

== Culture and community ==
=== Shopping ===
Currently there is only one food shop in Newmachar, a Co-op Food. The Co-op also contains a Post Office branch.

There is a village pharmacy called Newmachar Pharmacy.

=== Newmachar Scout and Guide Hall ===
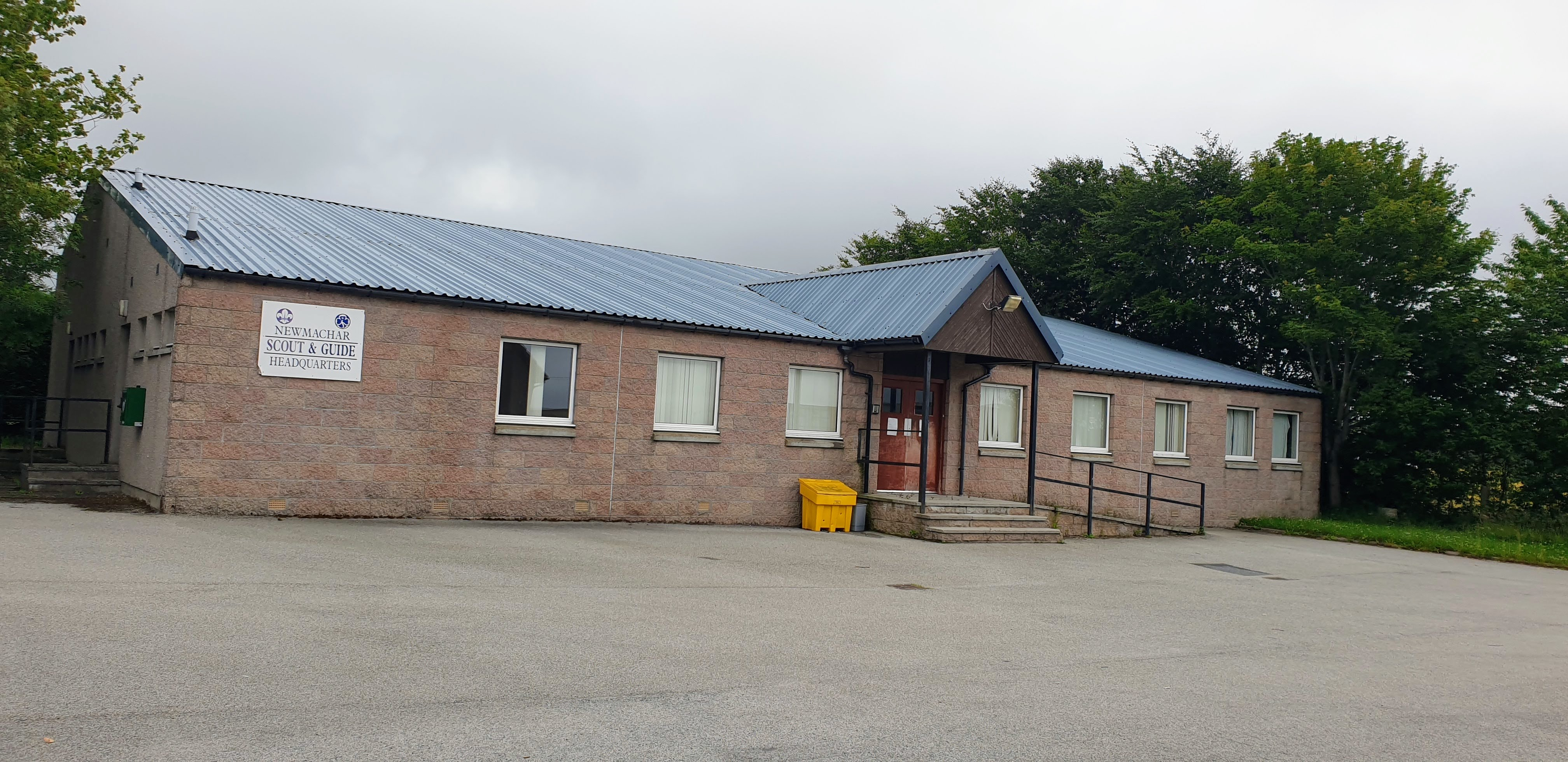
Newmachar Scout and Guide Hall

Towards the south end of the village is the Newmachar Scout and Guide Hall. This hall is used regularly by various groups including the Scouts, Guides, Playgroup, and many others.

=== Play park ===
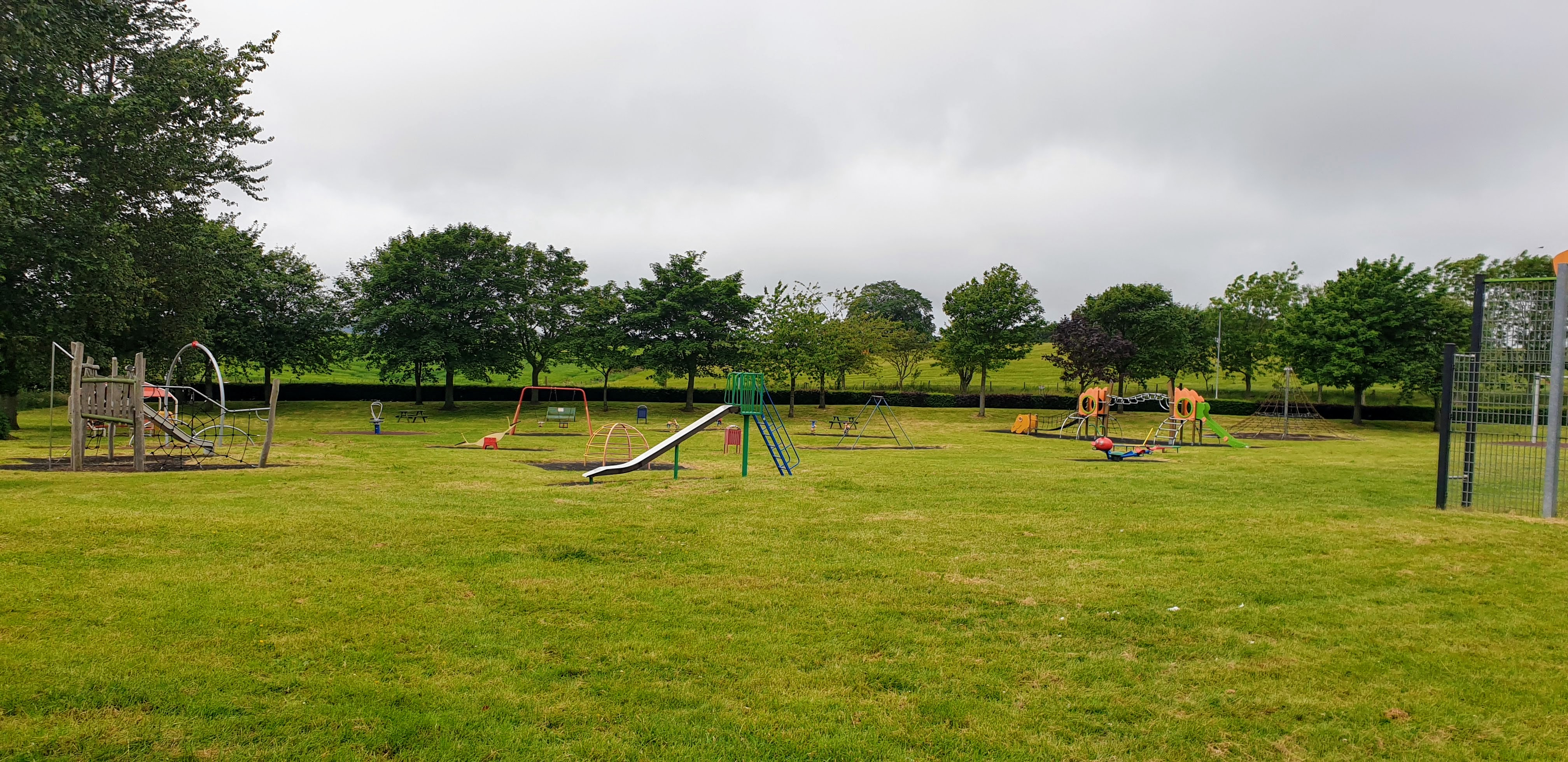
Large children's play park in the center of Newmachar

There is a large play park near the center of Newmachar including a small grass basketball/football pitch. Adjacent to the play park are fenced tennis courts.

=== Ingram's Neuk ===
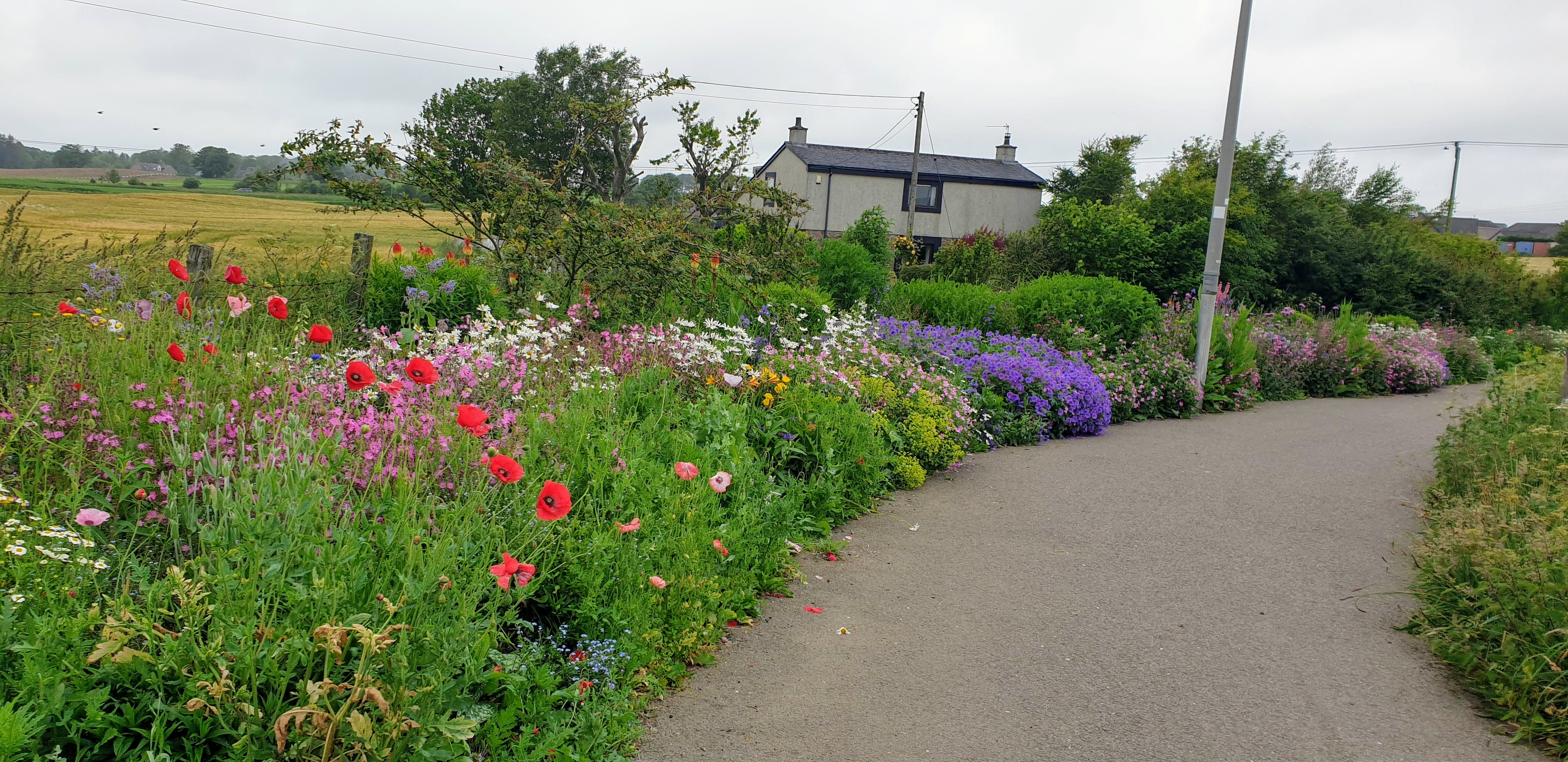
Local wildlife reserve on a track between Newmachar and Kingseat

Ingram's Neuk Community Wildlife Garden is small area of land which runs adjacent to path running between Kingseat and Newmachar. Started in 2010 it is currently mostly overgrown but the corner of the garden has been well maintained as shown.

The garden contains a willow tree "tunnel", larger snaking arrangement of small boulders, a number of fruit trees, raised beds and wild flowers.

== Sport ==
=== Axis Centre ===
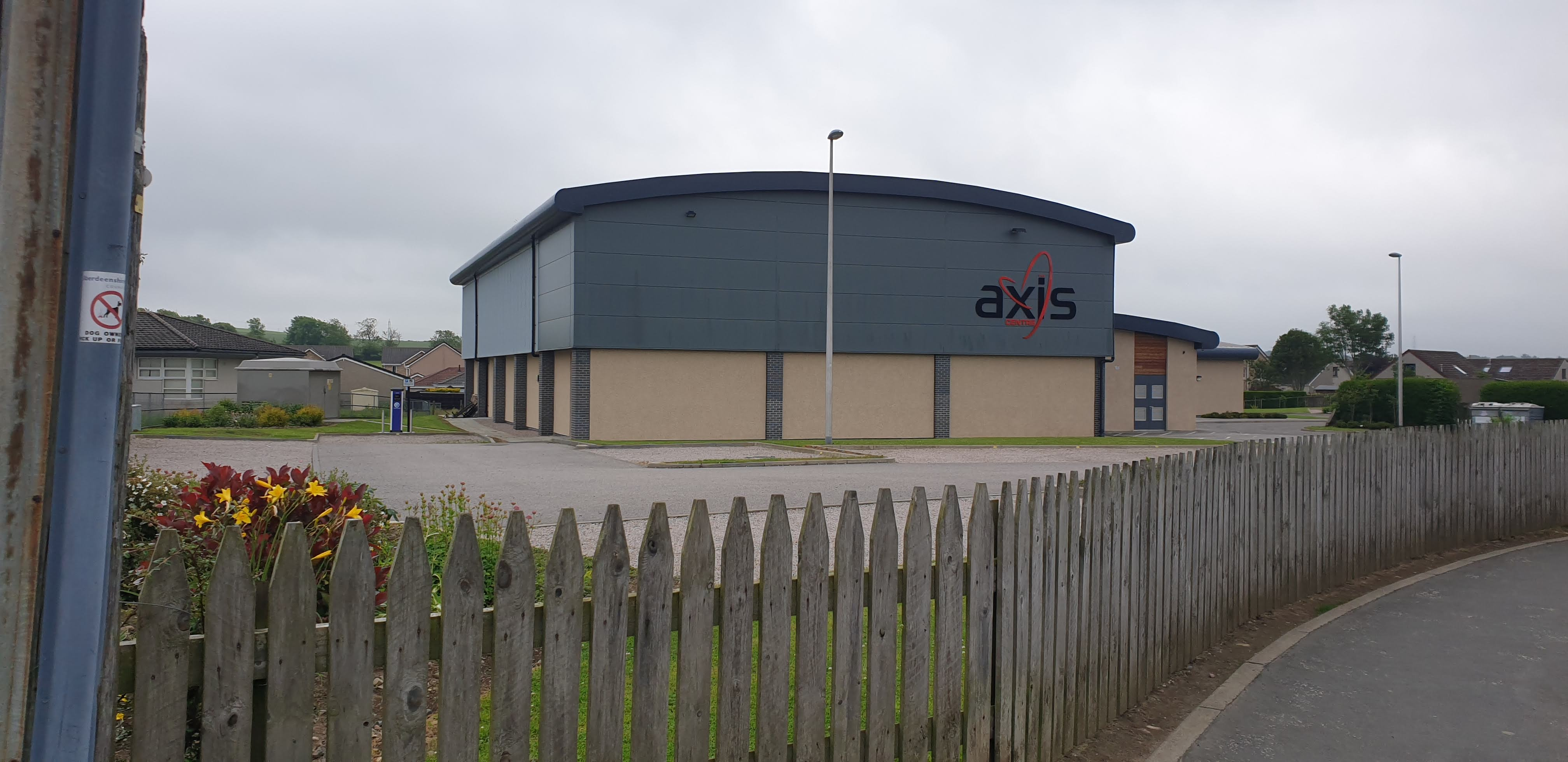
Outside of the Axis Centre taken from School Road

The original village hall was closed in 2012, and replaced with the Axis Centre, opened on 30 August 2014. The Axis Centre is a multipurpose facility owned and managed by the community. As well as a fitness suite, fitness classes and children's facilities it also houses "The Chinwag Café".

=== Bowling Club ===
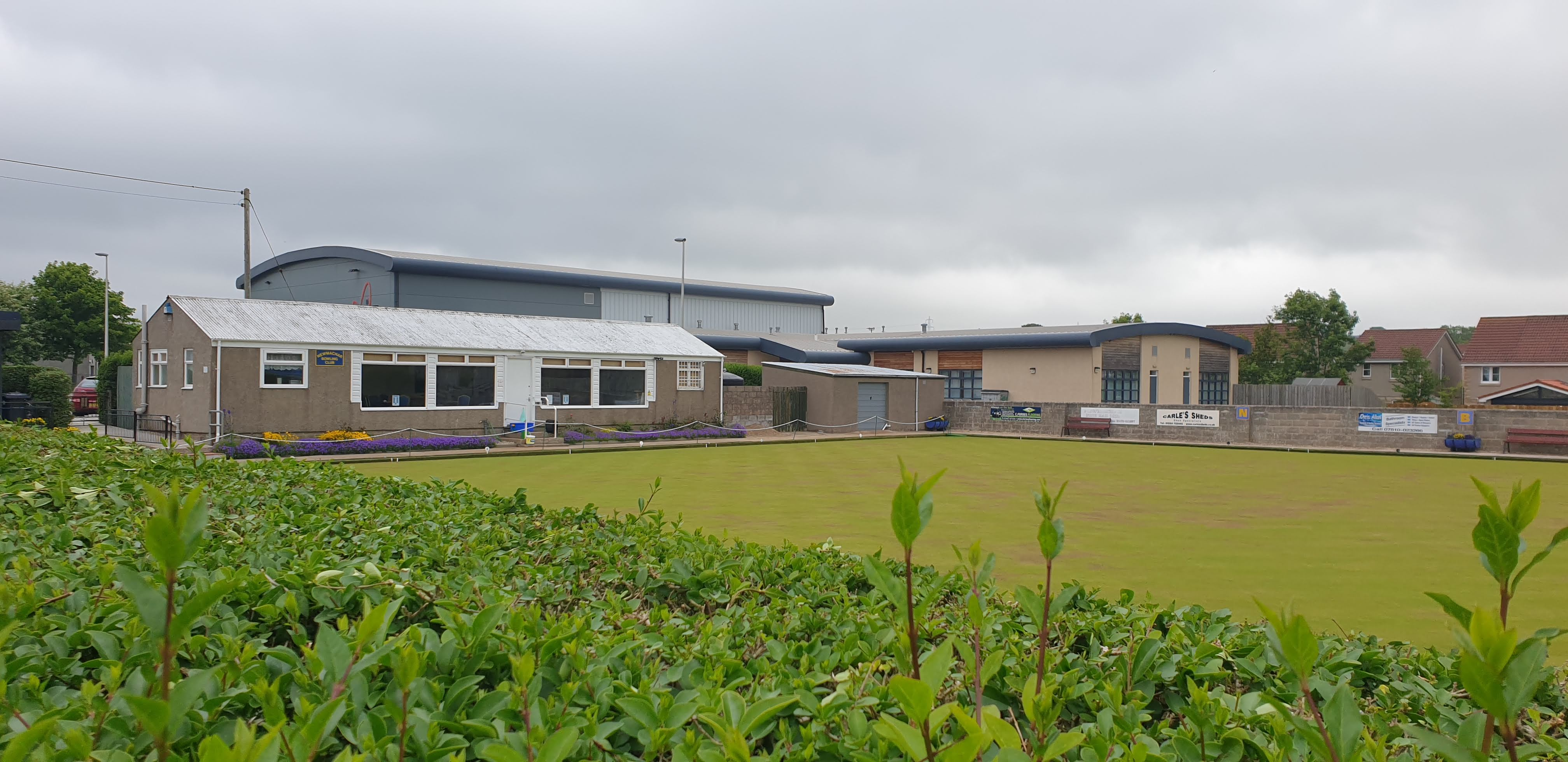
Outside of the Bowling Club green and hut taken from School Road

=== Golf ===
The local Newmachar Golf Club located just outside the village is noted for being the official golf course of Paul Lawrie at the time he won The Open in 1999. It was also the venue of a hole in one in which the winner became a professional with a handicap of 24. This was because, to claim the 15k prize, he had to be a pro at the sport.

=== Football ===
The village is also host to Newmachar United F.C., who are affiliated with the Scottish Junior Football Association.

== Education ==
=== Primary ===
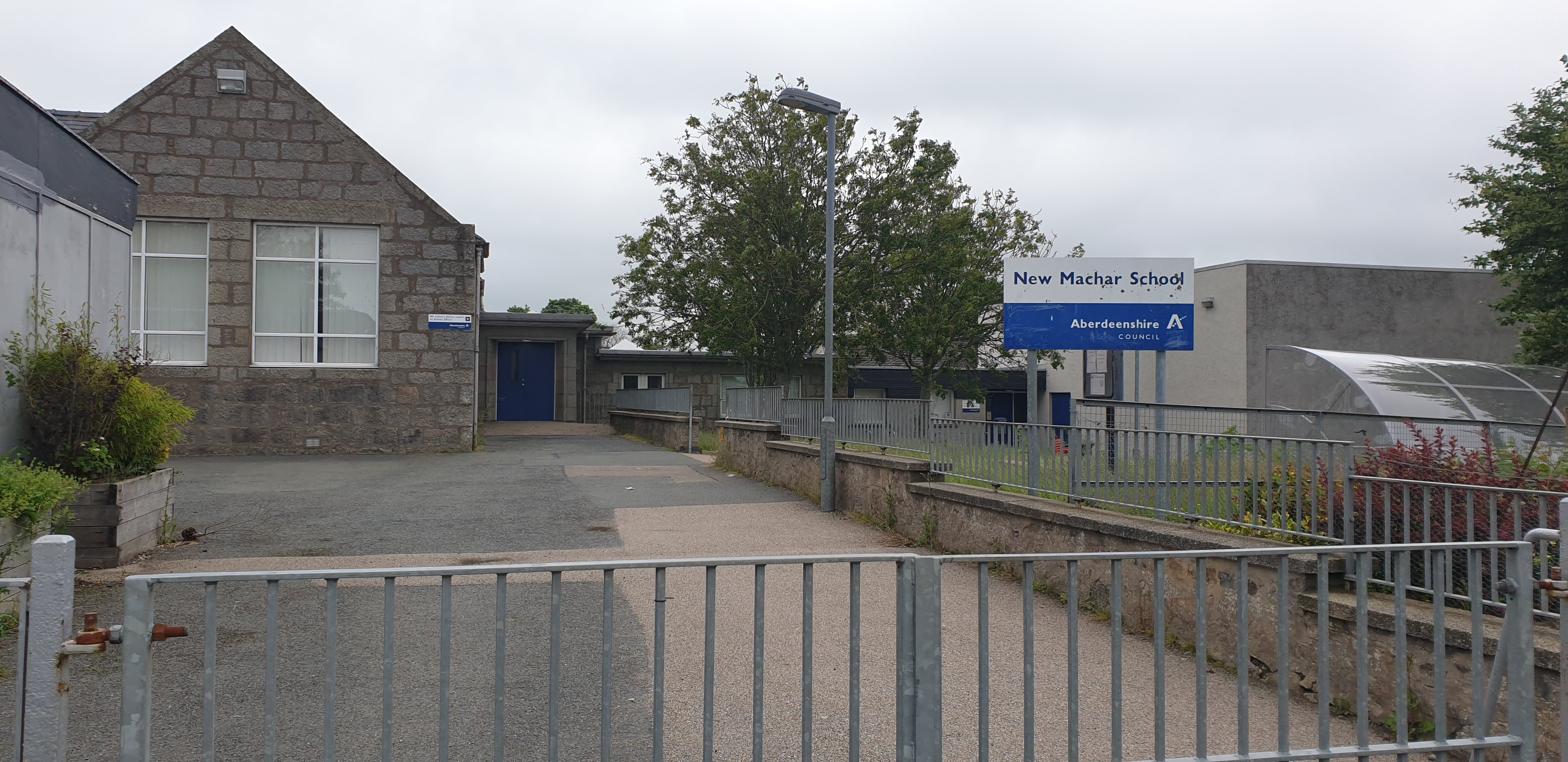
Outside of the School taken from School Road

New Machar School is a non-denominational primary school. It has a current role of 370 P1-P7 pupils and 55 pupils in the Early Learning and Childcare Centre. The catchment area is the village of Newmachar and the surrounding rural area.

=== Secondary ===
For secondary education most pupils transfer to Dyce Academy, an Aberdeen City school.

*Not fully confirmed as yet * Recently there was a change in the catchment area for the academy, as now children in Newmachar and Kingseat will now mainly get transferred to Inverurie Academy due to Dyce's secondary school nearing its capacity of students while Bucksburn Academy is already beyond capacity. This should free up space in Bucksburn and Dyce's education system. This is currently looking to take effect from 27/28 S1 intake. Current pupils at Dyce aren't being moved and the S1 intake dfor 26/27 will be headed to Dyce.[15]

=== Library ===
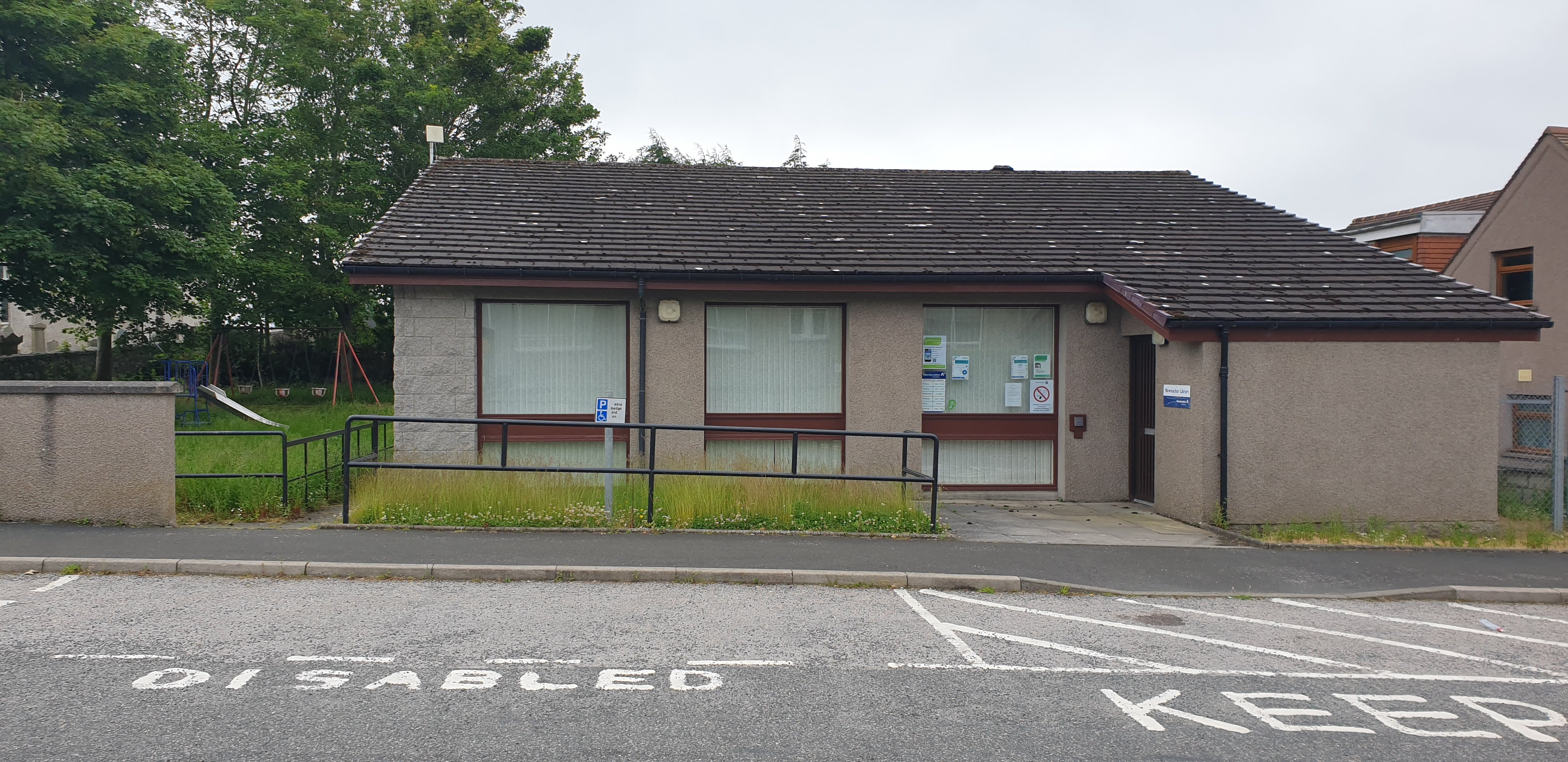
Outside of the Library taken from School Road

Located across the road from the primary school is Newmachar Library part of "Live Life Aberdeenshire Library Services".

== Religious sites ==
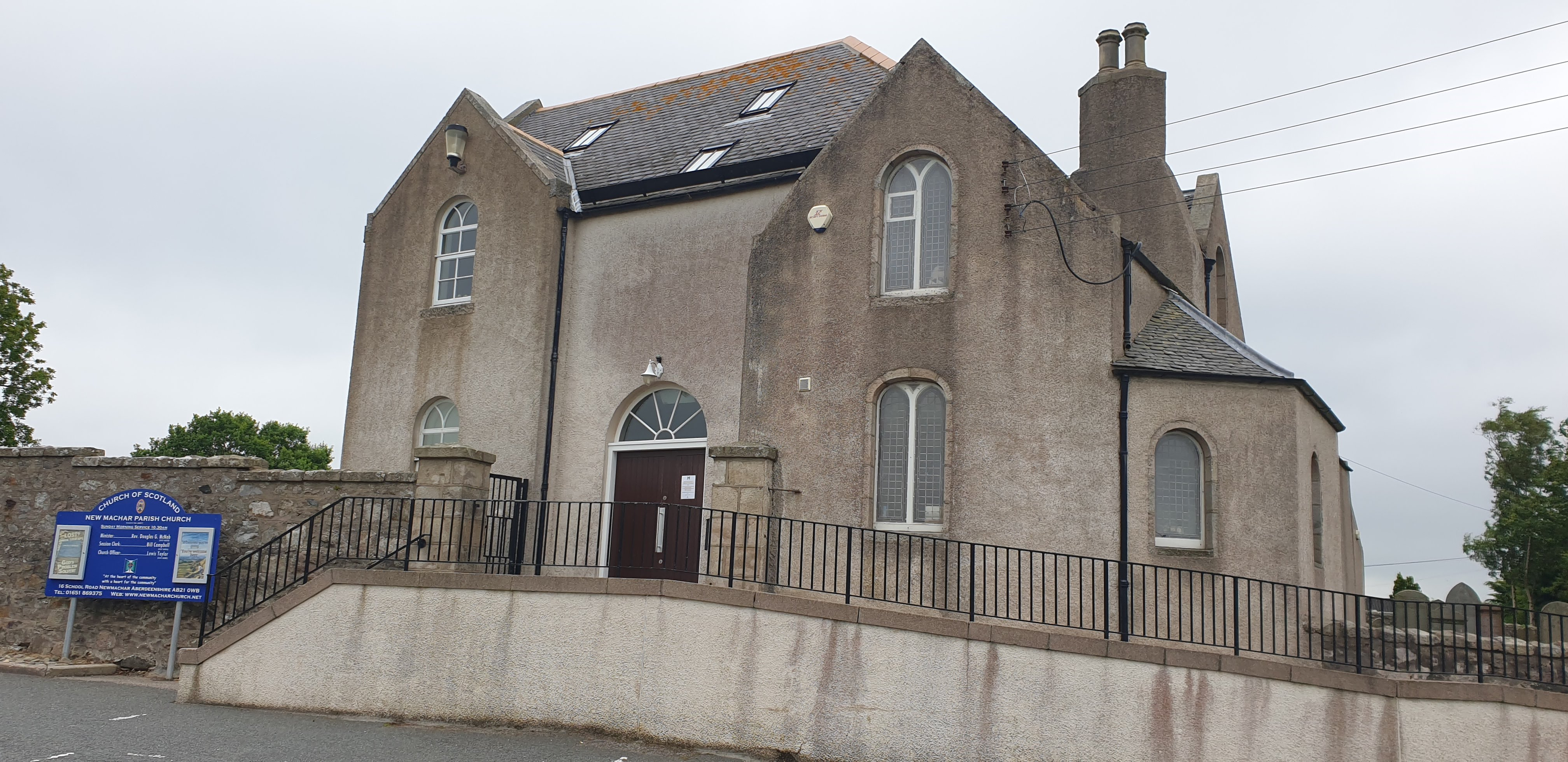
Outside of the Newmachar Church taken from School Road

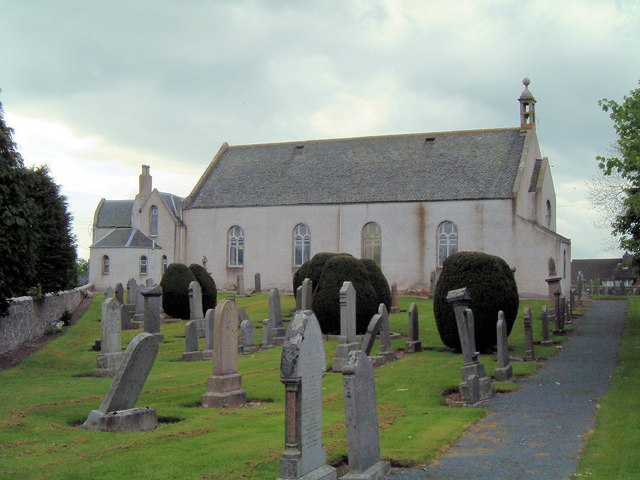
Other view of Newmachar Church also taken from School Road showing grave yard

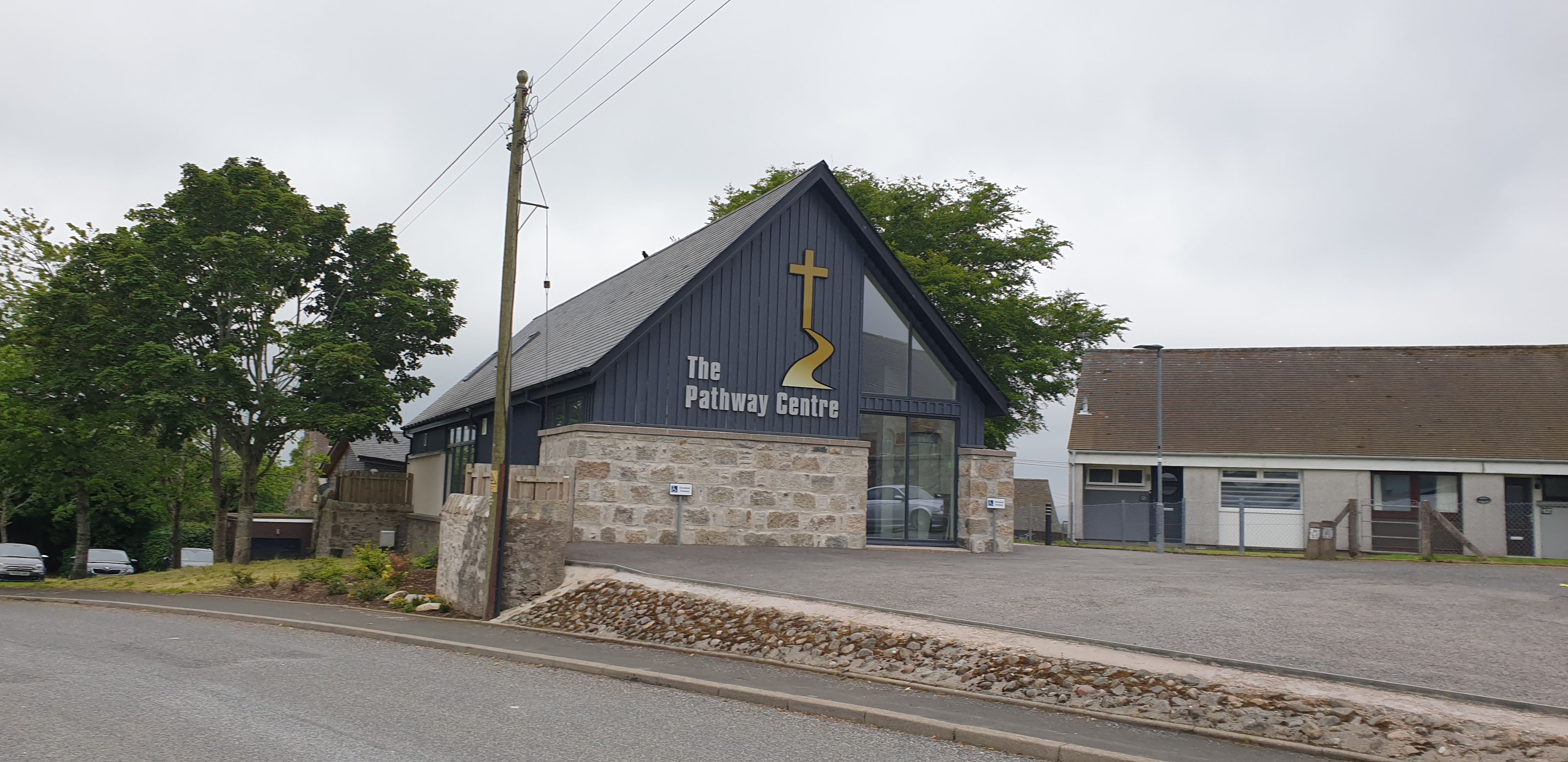
Outside of The Pathway Centre taken from School Road

New Machar Church is a late 18th-century building and part of the Church of Scotland with an extension built in 2006–2007.

The Pathways Centre was officially opened on Easter Sunday 2018, it comprises one main hall with multimedia facilities, a small meeting room and small kitchen for preparation of refreshments.

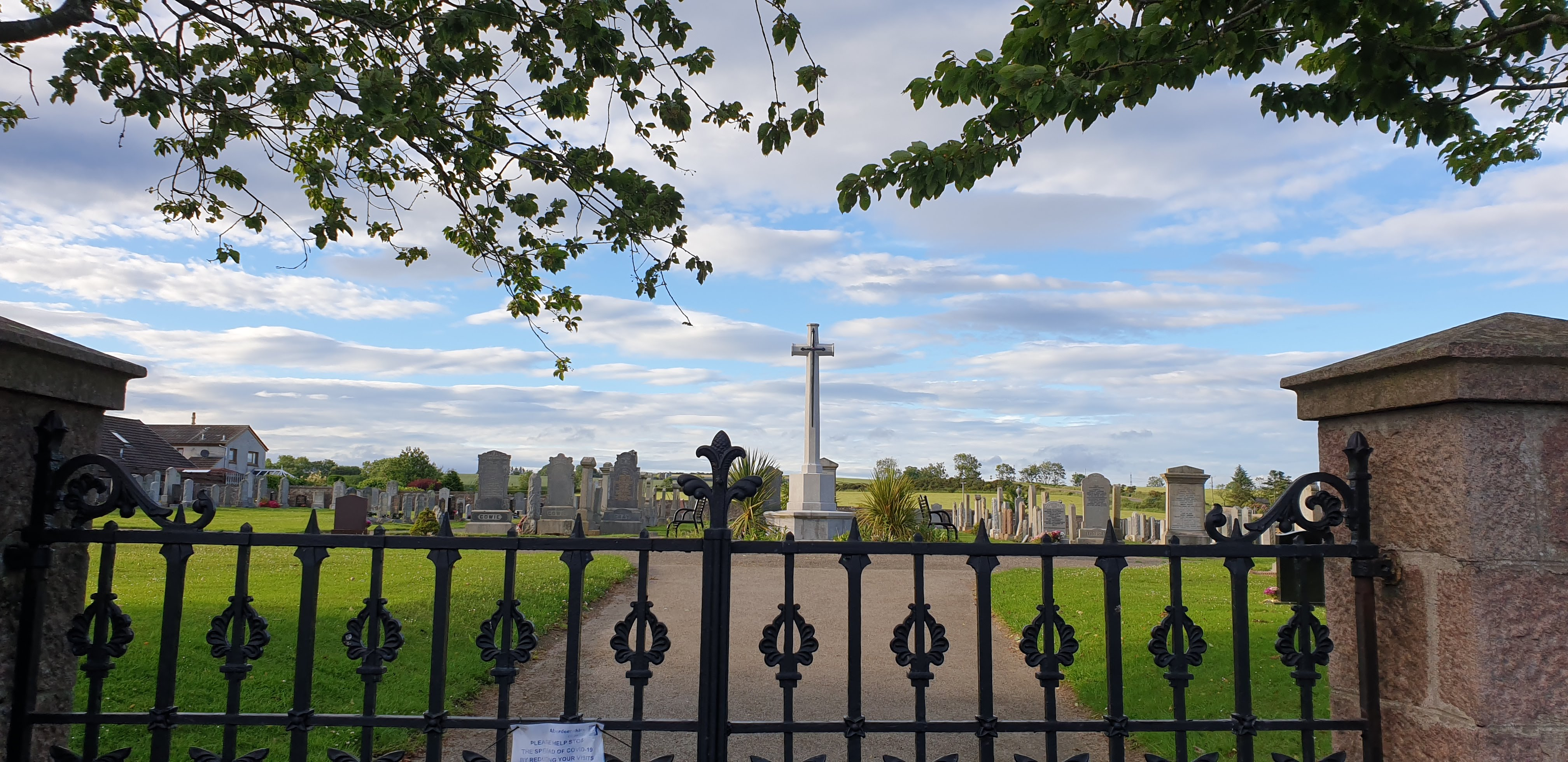
Newmachar Cemetery with Cross of Sacrifice

New Machar Cemetery, located a short distance from the church, contains burials from 1905. There are also Commonwealth War Graves within the Cemetery with a Cross of Sacrifice near the entrance.

The Parish of Newmachar War Memorial is located west of village.

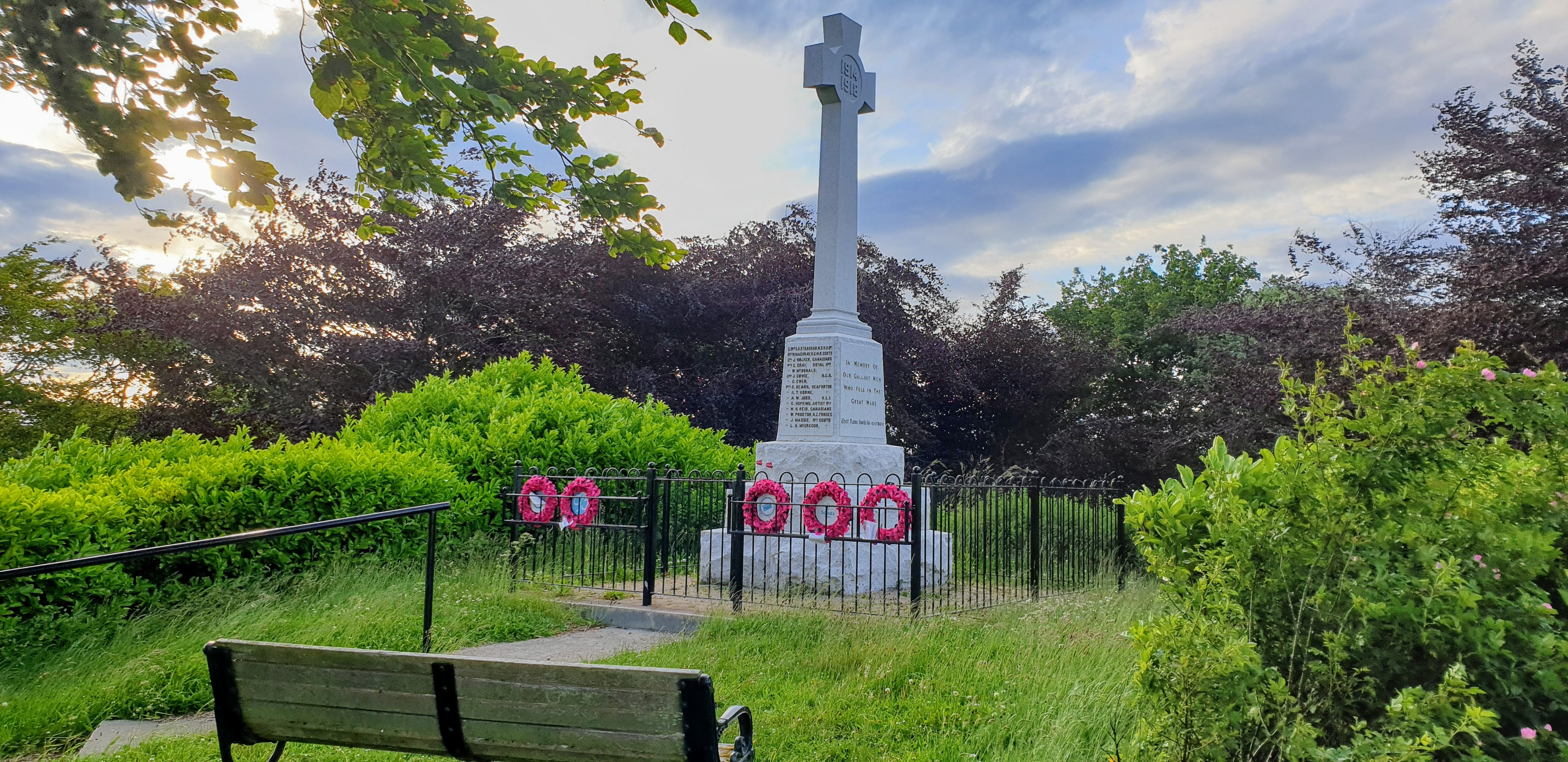
Newmachar War Memorial with poppy wreath

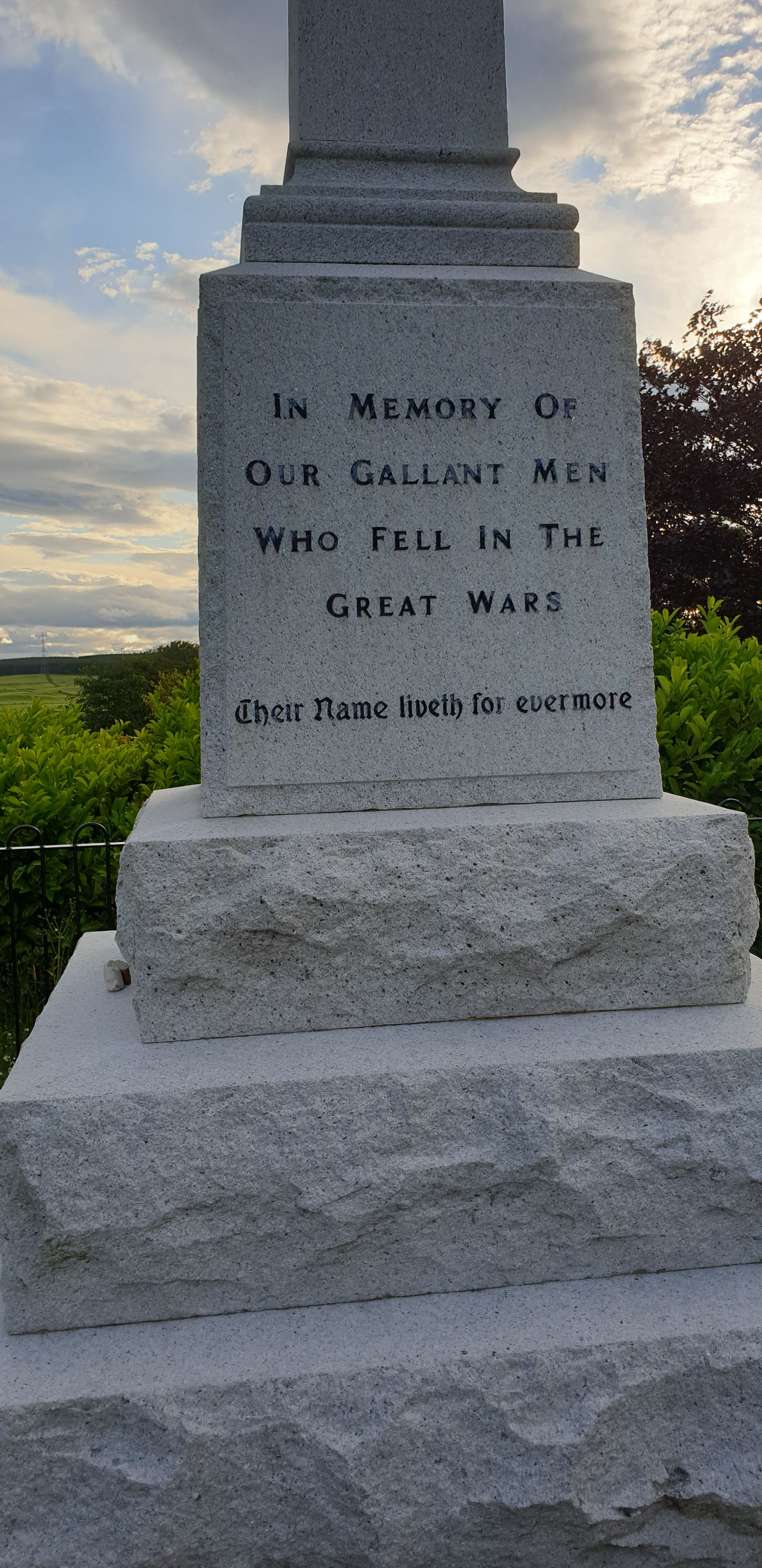
Newmachar War Memorial - In Memory of Our Gallant Men Who Fell In The Great Wars, Their Name liveth for evermore

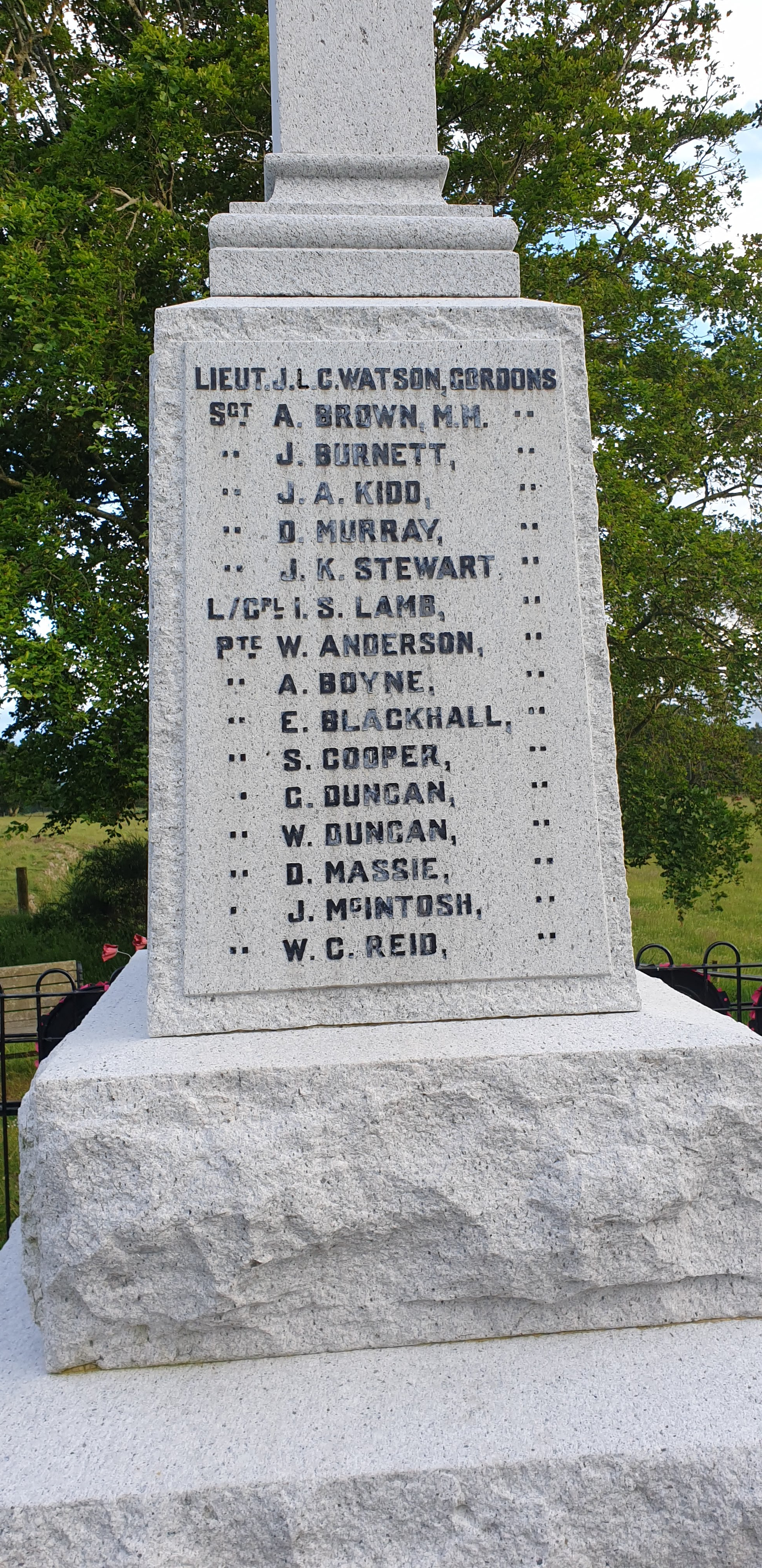
Newmachar War Memorial - Names

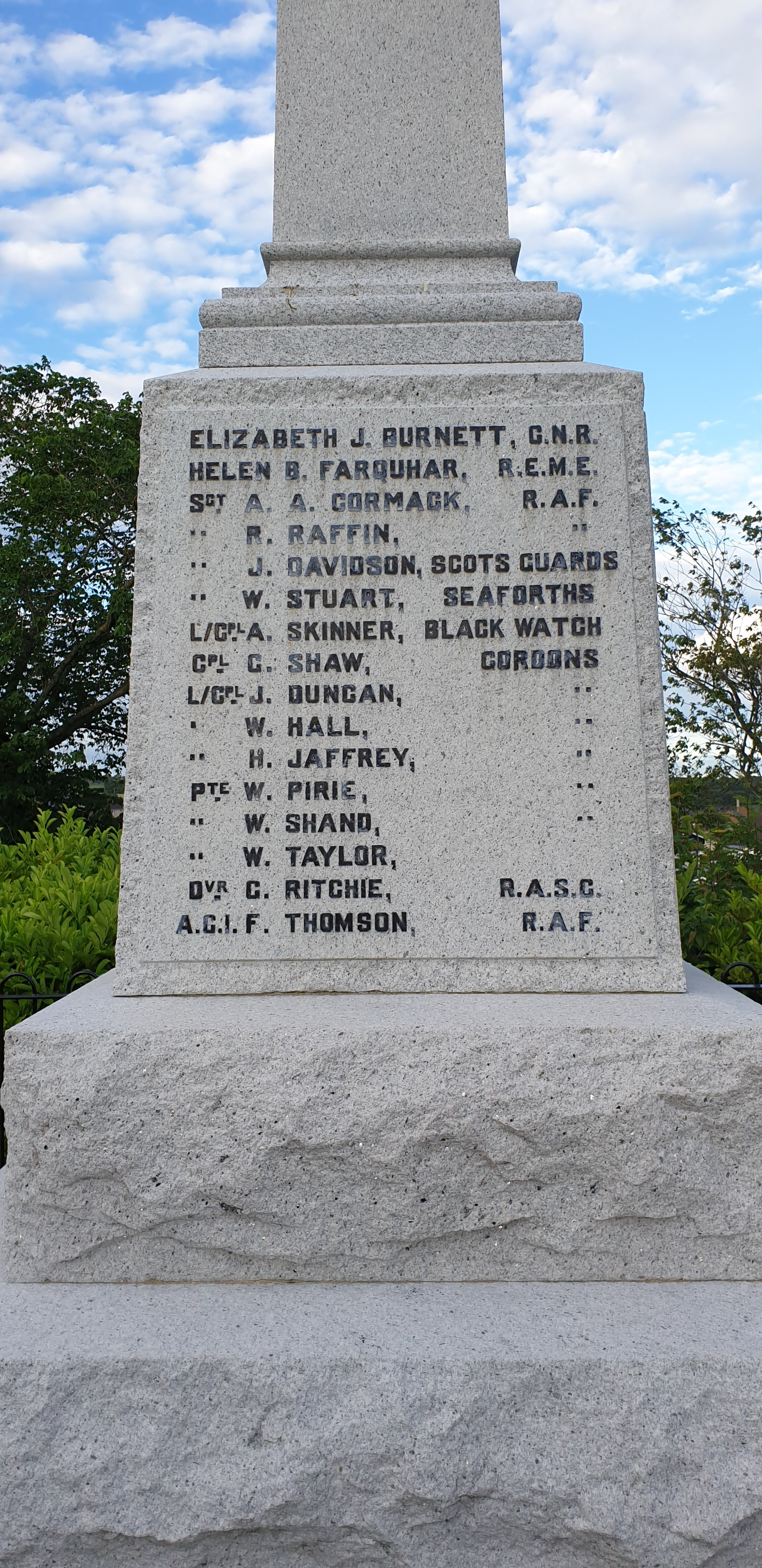
Newmachar War Memorial - Names

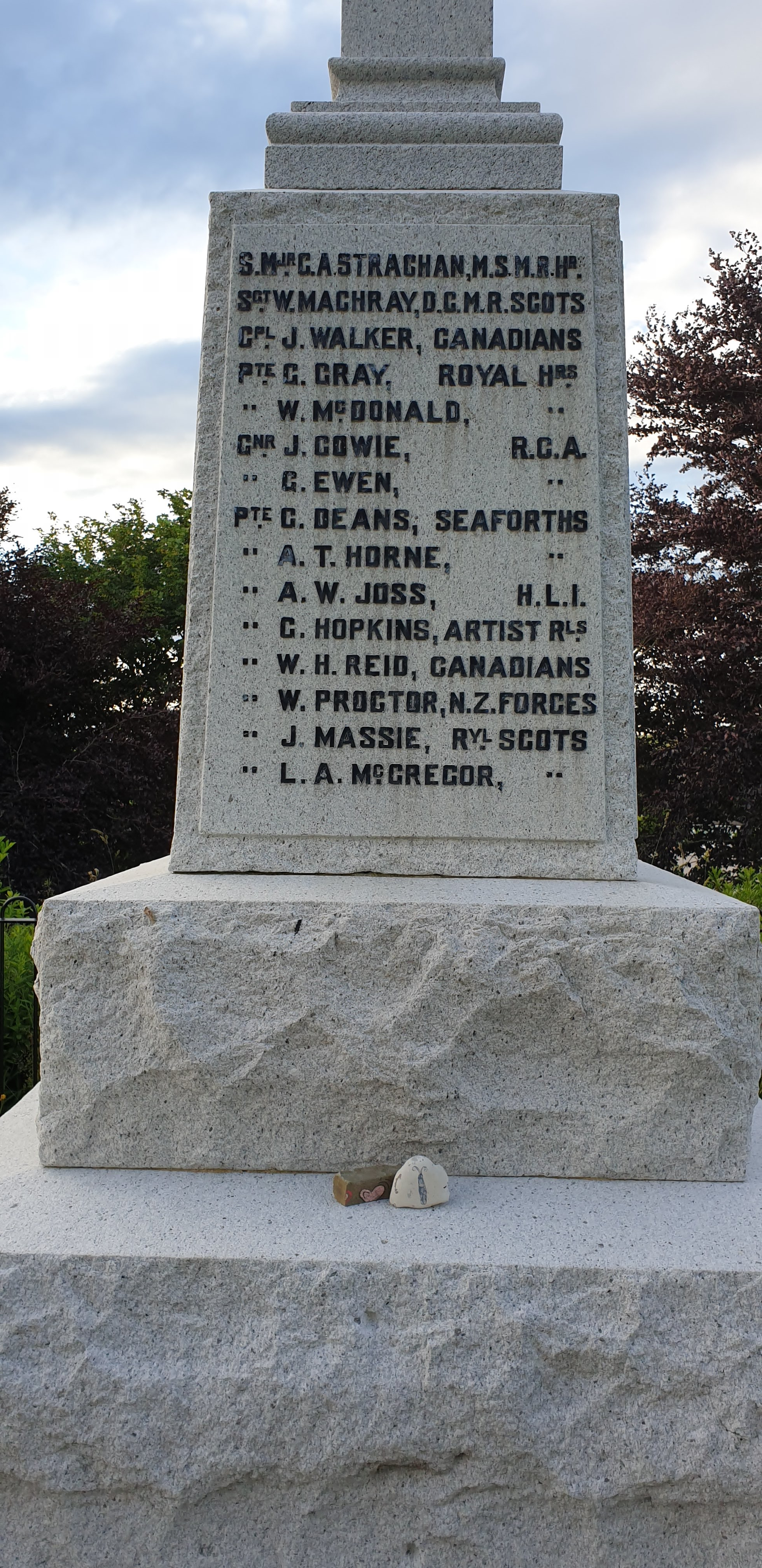
Newmachar War Memorial - Names

== In pop culture ==
The hamlet of Brokenwind (or Brokenwynd) near Newmachar was named the UK's third worst place name in a 2012 poll.

September 6, 2018, Radio 1 presenter Greg James managed to get a Cornish Pasty delivered to the village from Cornwall via Radio 1 listeners over the course of four days.

== Notable people ==
- Thomas Reid (1710–1796), The philosopher was parish minister from 1737 to 1752.
- Nora Griffith (1870–1937), The Egyptologist and archaeologist was born in the village.
- Neil Simpson (born 1961), The village was also the home to former Aberdeen FC player who was part of the Aberdeen team which won the 1983 Cup Winner's Cup under Sir Alex Ferguson.
- Jenny Gray (born 1932), awarded British Empire Medal for services to the Scouting Movement.
