= Kingseat Hospital (New Zealand) =

- Spookers
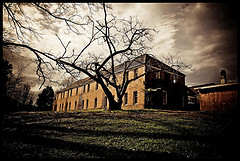
- The site of the former Kingseat Hospital in 2008, nine years after closure

Geography
- Location: Kingseat, New Zealand, Auckland Region, New Zealand
- Coordinates: 37.130°S 174.798°E

Organisation
- Type: Psychiatric

History
- Founded: February 1932
- Closed: July 1999

Links
- Lists: Hospitals in New Zealand

Kingseat Hospital was a psychiatric hospital that is considered to be one of New Zealand's notorious haunted locations with over one hundred claims of apparitions being reported, as of 2011. It is located in Kingseat, New Zealand, south of Auckland. Since 2005 it has been used as a site for Spookers, a haunted theme park. According to Stuff, Kingseat Hospital is considered one of the most haunted locations in New Zealand.

== Origin and name ==
The psychiatric hospital was built in Kingseat between 1929 and 1932. Kingseat was intended to replace the Carrington Hospital but ultimately became a secondary facility. The construction began when twenty patients from a nearby mental institution came to the site along with twelve wheelbarrows and ten shovels. Dr. Henry Bennett was originally the former owner of Kingseat Hospital in the 1950s. Kingseat Hospital was named after a hospital in Aberdeenshire, Scotland following the return of Dr Theodore Gray (the Director-General of the Mental Health Division of the Health Department at the time) from an overseas trip, who had worked at the Scottish asylum, and felt it appropriate to have a sister hospital with the same name in New Zealand. Flower gardens, shrubs and trees were grown in the grounds of Kingseat Hospital such as surplus plants from the Ellerslie Racecourse and Norfolk Island pines, originally seeds from Sir George Grey's garden on Kawau Island.

== Operation history ==
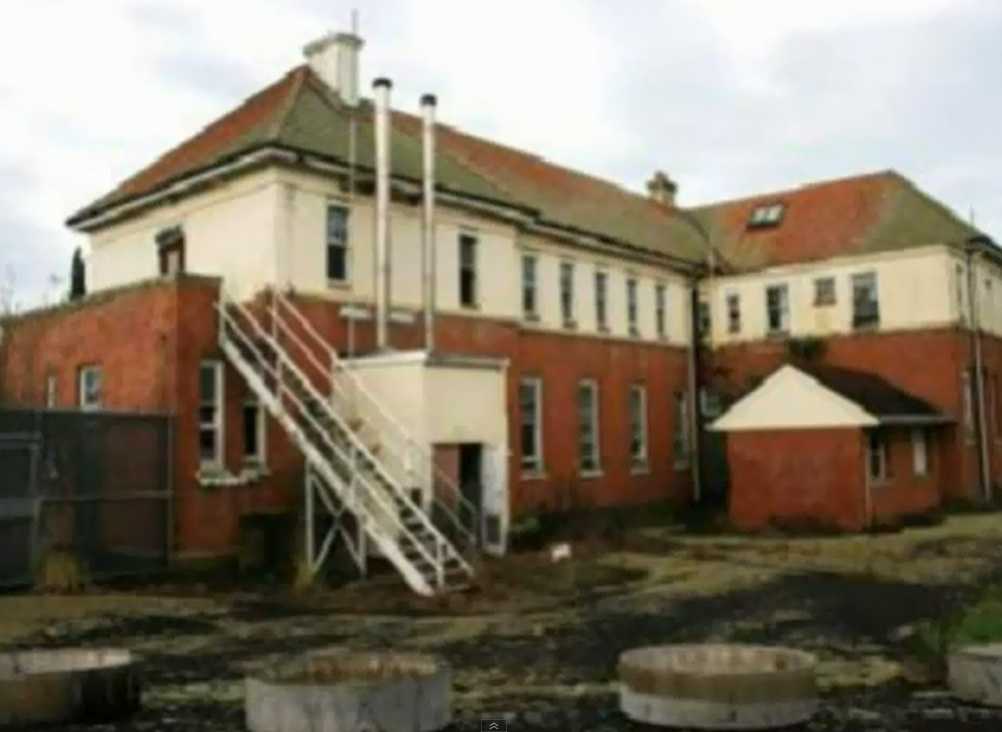
A view of the hospital.

Kingseat Hospital was in operation from 1932. In 1939, the Public Works Department and Fletcher Construction Company, Ltd. agreed on the construction of a two-storey nurses' home at Kingseat Hospital, with the government to provide the steel for the building. The hospital grew throughout the mid-late 1930s and 1940s to such an extent that by the beginning of 1947, there were over eight hundred patients. During the 1950s, Dr. Henry Bennett (the man whom the mental health wing at Waikato Hospital is named after) was a senior medical officer of health at Kingseat Hospital. From 1964, nursing staff at Kingseat were given name tags to wear on their uniforms. In 1968, certain nurses at Kingseat Hospital went on strike, which forced the administration to invite unemployed people and volunteers to assist within the hospital grounds with domestic chores. In 1973, a therapeutic pool was opened by the then-Mayoress of Auckland, Mrs. Barbara Goodman, four years before the main swimming pool was added to the hospital in 1977. The site celebrated its 50th anniversary jubilee in 1982. During the 1970s and 1980s, there were many places attached to psychiatric hospitals in New Zealand where alcoholics were treated for their drinking addictions. Villas 4 and 11 at Kingseat Hospital served this purpose. In later years, the hospital accepted voluntary patients. In 1996, South Auckland Health sold Kingseat Hospital after government decisions to replace ongoing hospitalisation of mentally ill patients with community care and rehabilitation units. This led to the eventual closure of Kingseat Hospital in July 1999, when the final patients were re-located off the complex to a mental health unit in Ōtara.

== Post-hospital use ==
After the closure of Kingseat Hospital in 1999, the grounds were initially considered as a potential site for a new prison, able to accommodate six hundred inmates. In 2000, legal action was taken against the Tainui tribe for financial issues involving the former hospital. By 2004, more than two hundred people had come forward to file complaints against the national government for claims of mistreatment and abuse of patients at New Zealand's psychiatric institutions (including Kingseat Hospital) during the 1960s and 1970s. In 2005, a television episode of Ghost Hunt featured the site of the former hospital. As of 2007, the most common apparition reportedly seen at Kingseat Hospital was the "Grey Nurse", believed to be a former staff member, in and around the former nurses' home. In 2009, the owning company of the former hospital claimed it would proceed with plans to disconnect the water supply of residents within the local region, leaving many to either pay large fees for a different supply or to install new water tanks.

In 2011, ideas were proposed to grow the area in the Kingseat suburb tenfold for the area's equine industry. This involved propositions of rezoning to residential a majority of the land around Kingseat Hospital, although certain buildings, structures and plant life on the former hospital site were protected due to historic and cultural value. In 2013, a property developer revealed a plan to transform the site of the hospital into a countryside living estate with 450 homes. The plan sparked debate over which buildings and their park-like surroundings should stay as a reminder of its past, with the New Zealand Historic Places Trust requesting better protection of heritage values of buildings and plants. However, some residents insisted that the complex represented a sad past and shouldn't be highlighted as heritage. The promo for the 2014 season of local television show Shortland Street was partly filmed at Kingseat Hospital as was a music video for I Am Giant. Since 2013, the hospital and grounds have been also used for a paintball arena.

=== Spookers ===
In 2005, Spookers, a haunted theme park, opened in the area of the former nurses' home at the hospital. Many of the special effects at Spookers were created with assistance from Wētā Workshop.

In 2010, New Zealand filmmaker Dale Stewart shot his horror film Compound at the former hospital property after receiving permission from Spookers, the current owners. Spookers were finalists of the year's Tourism Industry Awards. Spookers also won the Contribution to the Community Award for its staff's contribution to raising money for Ronald McDonald House at the 2010 Westpac Manukau Business Excellence Awards. In late 2011, Spookers opened the Amazing Maze n' Maize.

A 2017 a namesake documentary about the attraction was directed by Florian Habicht. In Australia, the documentary Spookers aired on SBS Viceland and SBS on Demand.

In 2018, Spookers was put up for sale.

Spookers was purchased by the New Zealand-based event management company Armageddon Expo in July 2022.

=== Dutch elm disease outbreak ===
In July 2013, there was a record outbreak of Dutch elm disease in two hundred trees at the site of the former hospital.
