= Esslemont (surname) =

Esslemont is a surname. Notable people with the surname include:

- Anna Esslemont, Welsh folk musician, member of Uiscedwr
- George Birnie Esslemont (1860-1917), British politician
- Ian Cameron Esslemont (born 1962), Canadian writer
- John Esslemont (1874-1925), Scottish Bahá'í
- Mary Esslemont (1891-1984), Scottish doctor
- Peter Esslemont (1834-1894), Scottish politician
- Sonny Esslemont (born 1993), Scottish rugby player
