= Esslemont railway station =

Disused railway station in Esslemont, Aberdeenshire

Esslemont
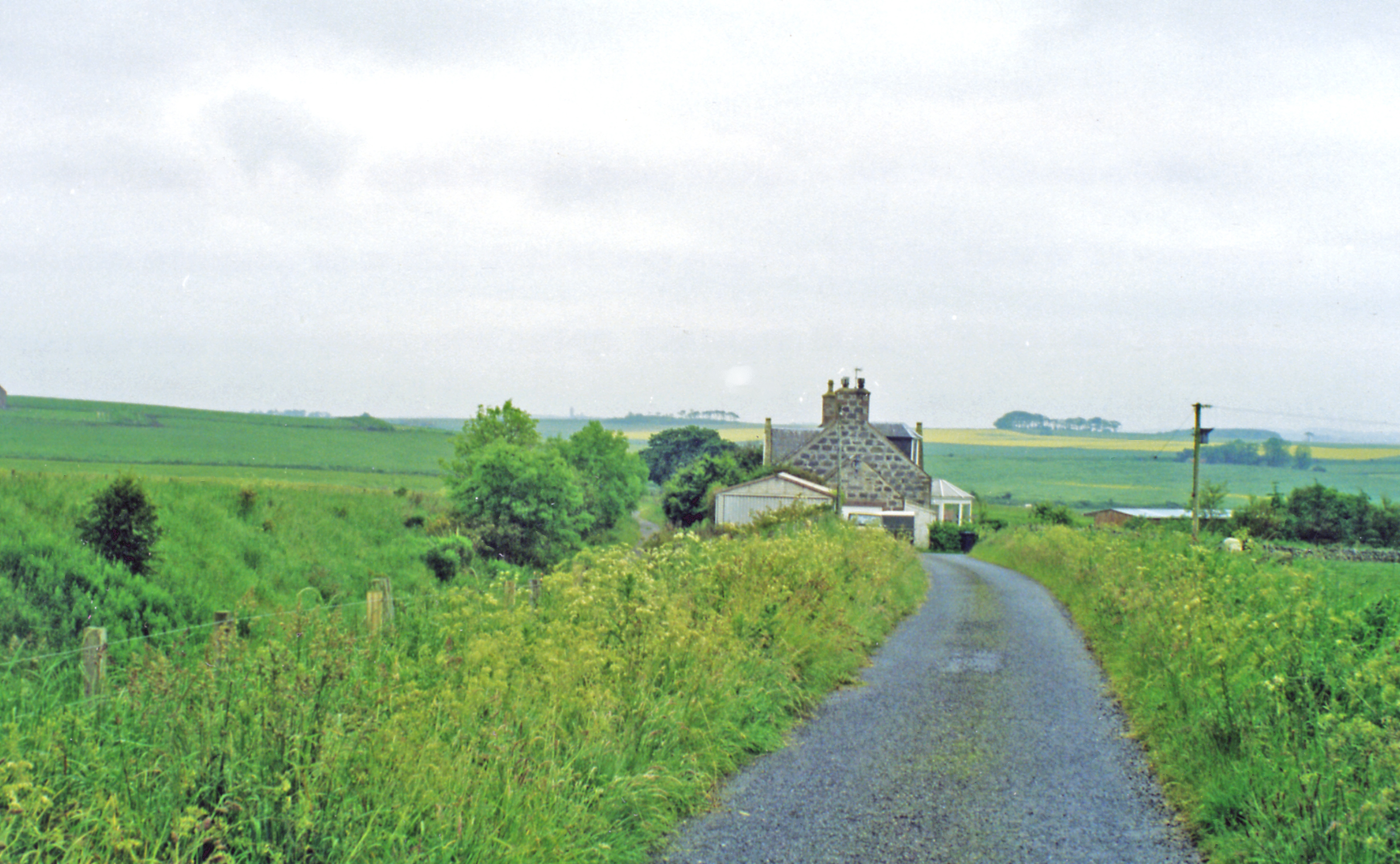
- Site of the station (1997)

General information
- Location: Esslemont, Aberdeenshire; Scotland
- Coordinates: 57.351°N 2.112°W
- Platforms: 1 initially; later 2

Other information
- Status: Disused

History
- Original company: Formartine and Buchan Railway
- Pre-grouping: Great North of Scotland Railway
- Post-grouping: LNER

Key dates
- 18 July 1861: opened
- 15 Sept. 1952: closed
Location

Esslemont railway station was a railway station in Esslemont, Aberdeenshire.

== History ==
The station was opened on 18 July 1861 by the Formartine and Buchan Railway. To the south was the goods yard. It initially had one platform but later gained a second; the passing loop was removed in 1919. The station closed on 15 September 1952.

Preceding station	Disused railways	Following station
Logierieve; Line and station closed	Great North of Scotland Railway; Formartine and Buchan Railway	Ellon; Line and station closed
