= Udny Station =

Coordinates: 57.310°N 2.155°W

- Location within Aberdeenshire
- OS grid reference: NJ 908244
- Council area: Aberdeenshire
- Lieutenancy area: Aberdeenshire
- Country: Scotland
- Sovereign state: United Kingdom
- Post town: Ellon
- Postcode district: AB41
- Dialling code: 01651
- Police: Scotland
- Fire: Scottish
- Ambulance: Scottish
- UK Parliament: Gordon and Buchan
- Scottish Parliament: Aberdeenshire East

Udny Station (/ˈwɪdnɪ/) is a small village in Aberdeenshire, Scotland. It lies approximately 8 miles east of Oldmeldrum and 5 miles south-west of Ellon, and forms part of the parish of Foveran.

== History ==
The settlement developed around the former railway station on the Formartine and Buchan line to Fraserburgh, from which it takes its name. The line closed in the early 1980s and the tracks were subsequently removed.

There was a goods yard with railway sidings at the station, located in the area where a number of newer houses have since been built. Along the former platform alignment, one of the original lighting units (minus its glass) remains visible, mounted on a concrete post. About a mile south of the station, on the former trackbed, old level crossing gates are still present and retain their orange circular warning plates.

== Second World War ==
Near Tillycorthie House, beside the former railway line and approximately 200 yards south of the railway bridge, there is a clump of trees. Between this area and Corthiemuir Farm, 15 high-explosive bombs were dropped, straddling the railway line, one of which failed to detonate. In addition, 20 incendiary bombs were dropped, setting fire to the grain store at the farm.

Several farms in the surrounding area made use of prisoners of war as agricultural labour, supplied from the POW camp at Pitmedden. The former entrance to the camp is now a bridge leading to a housing estate on the south side of Pitmedden, approximately 100 yards from the Aberdeen–Tarves road junction beside the church.

During the Second World War, a wooden observation hut occupied the site of the later Royal Observer Corps installation.

== Cold War ==
On the eastern edge of the village, in the direction of Cultercullen, a field contains a fenced-off area with visible air vents. This was the site of a Royal Observer Corps station. Accessed via a hatch, underground rooms were used during the Cold War by the ROC. Many such stations existed across the United Kingdom and most were taken out of service in 2001. The Udny Station site has since been largely stripped of its internal fittings. The later bunker was subsequently removed and infilled by the landowner and is no longer visible.
