= Dale Stewart (filmmaker) =

New Zealand filmmaker

- Born: 30 March 1985 (age 40); Edinburgh, Scotland
- Occupations: Film director, producer and editor, screenwriter

Dale Stewart (born 30 March 1985) is a New Zealand film director, producer, editor and screenwriter, best known for his 2012 horror film Compound. He gained international recognition early in his career with his short horror short film, Awakened, in 2008.

== Early life ==
Stewart, the eldest of three children, was born on 30 March 1985, and grew up in Edinburgh, Scotland. He stayed there until 1999 when he immigrated to Auckland, New Zealand, with his parents and two brothers.

== Film career ==
=== Awakened ===
In 2007, Stewart attended South Seas Film School in Auckland. While he was there, he wrote and produced the short horror film, Awakened. As an aspiring film director, he took the opportunity to make a name for himself and started making inquires about entering his film into overseas film festivals. After he submitted his synopsis to a few major festivals, Stewart received a phone call from the New York Independent Film Festival requesting that he send them his film to them as soon as it was complete.

On 30 November 2007, the eve of his last day of film school, Stewart was informed by email that not only had his short film been accepted for the New York festival (which was held in March 2008) but also the Los Angeles Film Festival (which was held in July 2008). Following this success, Stewart appeared on the front page of his local newspaper and was later featured in the New Zealand national newspaper, The Sunday News.

Stewart attend the New York festival in March 2008. His short film was the only short film to play four times over the festival's run. It was nominated for "Best Short Film Horror". At the Los Angeles festival, Stewart won "Best International Director of a Short Film", the first award of his career. Awakened was selected as one of the 47 short films and feature films to play at the Rhode Island Horror Festival in October 2008.

=== Compound ===
Stewart's first feature film, Compound, is a horror that he directed, produced and edited in 2011. It was filmed and based at Spookers, a horror theme park in Karaka, Auckland. Stewart also made a cameo as "Control Room Man".

Stewart had visited Spookers, a theme park in the grounds of an old mental hospital, in 2007, and was amazed by the location. A friend suggested that Stewart should approach them with an offer to make a film there; Stewart rejected the idea at first, on the basis that he didn't have enough experience. After getting back from New York in 2008, however, Stewart decided to take a risk and approach the owners of Spookers. He set up a meeting with the general manager, Julia Watson, in May 2008, and pitched her his idea. Although she told him that Spookers had turned down a lot of similar requests, Stewart persuaded her that his film would maximise their exposure not only in New Zealand, but overseas. The CEO of Spookers, Andy Watson, was also interested in the idea, but wanted to start shooting on 1 February 2009. Watson and Stewart agreed that if Stewart hadn't raised the money he needed to fund the film within nine months, the project would be put off until there was enough money available.

In June 2008, Stewart started to scout around for cast and crew. Most of the actors he chose were those that had worked on Awakened, or friends from his film school; he also sent a memo to the staff of Spookers, to see if any of them were interested in auditioning. He decided to relocate to Perth, Australia, to live with family, in order to save money while he was trying to raise funding. While in Australia, he would cast the rest of his film via email without seeing anyone audition. Stewart remained in Perth from July 2008 to January 2009, working full-time at a petrol station, with a part-time job delivering flyers.

In August 2008, Stewart met someone who was interested in funding his film. However, one month before the shooting was to begin, the investor was affected greatly by the 2008 financial crisis and forced to pull out of the project. Stewart found other means of gathering the money, and returned to New Zealand on 21 January 2009. Principal photography began on 1 February, as planned, and was wrapped up on 16 April.

In November, Stewart was invited to attend the New Zealand comic expo Armageddon to promote the film with fans.

Compound was met with critical acclaim and is in talks with distributors.

== Awards and honours ==
Year	Nominee / work	Award	Result
2008	Awakened	Best Short Film Horror – New York Independent Film Festival	Nominated
2008	Awakened	Best International Director of a Short Film – Los Angeles Film Festival	Won
2008	Awakened	Best Horror Film – Rhode Island International Horror Festival	Nominated
