= Kingseat Hospital, Aberdeenshire =

Kingseat Hospital
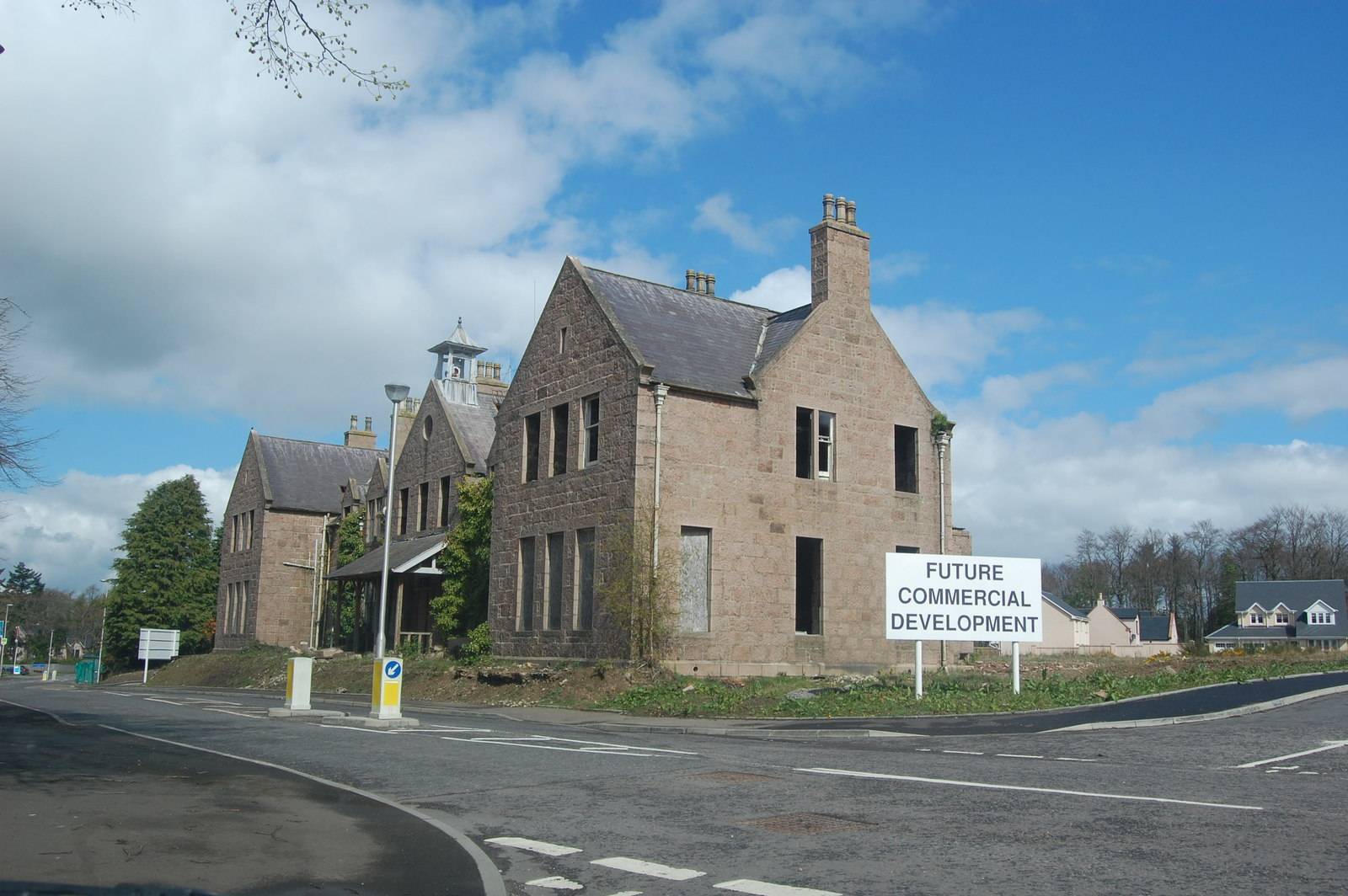
- Former Administration Building at Kingseat Hospital

- Shown in Aberdeenshire

Geography
- Location: Kingseat, Aberdeenshire, Aberdeenshire, Scotland
- Coordinates: 57.2625°N 2.1596°W

Organisation
- Care system: NHS Scotland
- Type: Psychiatric hospital

Services
- Emergency department: No

History
- Founded: 1904
- Closed: 1994

Links
- Lists: Hospitals in Scotland

Kingseat Hospital is a former mental health facility near Newmachar in Aberdeenshire, Scotland. Some of the old hospital buildings now form the central area of the village of Kingseat.

== History ==
The hospital, which was designed by Alexander Marshall Mackenzie using a village-type layout, opened as the Aberdeen District Asylum in May 1904. Six additional villas were added later. The hospital was used as a naval hospital for wounded sailors who had been serving on arctic convoys or the atlantic convoys during the Second World War and then joined the National Health Service as Kingseat Hospital in 1948. After the introduction of Care in the Community in the early 1980s, the hospital went into a period of decline and closed in April 1994. Many of the buildings have been demolished and the site has been redeveloped by Avant Homes for residential use.

== New Zealand Kingseat ==
The New Zealand Kingseat Hospital was named after the Scottish one, after Theodore Gray (Director-General of the Mental Health Division of the Health Department) returned from an overseas trip and felt it appropriate to have a sister hospital with the same name in New Zealand.
