= Sourden railway station =

Former railway station in Scotland

Sourden

General information
- Location: Rothes, Moray; Scotland
- Coordinates: 57.5419°N 3.1893°W
- Grid reference: NJ289508
- Platforms: 1

Other information
- Status: Disused

History
- Original company: Morayshire Railway
- Pre-grouping: Great North of Scotland Railway

Key dates
- 23 August 1858: Opened
- August 1866: Station closed
- Pre 1903: Sourden Siding closed to freight
Location

Sourden railway station or Sourdon railway station, later Sourden Siding, served the rural area near Aikenway Castle and the Wood of Sourden, Moray, Scotland from 1858 to 1866 on the Morayshire Railway. This was an intermediate station on the Rothes-Orton line of the former Great North of Scotland Railway that had originally been opened by the Morayshire Railway in 1858. The hamlet of Newlands is located nearby on the road to Rothes.

== History ==
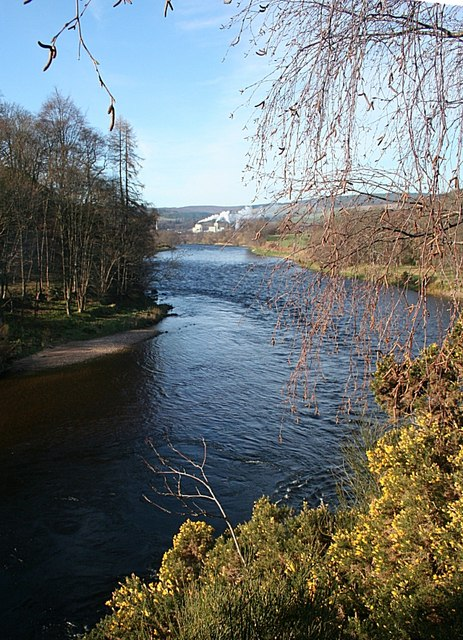
The River Spey near the Bridge of Spey with Rothes in the distance.

Sourden was opened on 23 August 1858 as a request stop; however, the station closed on 1 August 1866. Alongside Orton Junction, the permanent way was not lifted until 1907.

The Rothes - Orton section itself was closed to regular traffic from 31 July 1866 due to the construction of the route from Elgin to Rothes which made this line superfluous. For several years irregular goods traffic ran between Rothes and what became known as Sourden Siding until sometime prior to 1903.

The Boat of Aikenway public ferry that ran across the River Spey was located nearby.

The Bridge of Sourden, the Pass of Sourden and the Sourden Pool on the River Spey are located nearby.

== Infrastructure ==
The single platformed station stood on the western side of the single track line close to the mile post indicating two miles from Orton. The short platform was accessed via the nearby B9015 road. A group of buildings stood beside the station and a signal post was located near the ferry, however no signal box is shown on the OS maps. A building located in a typical site for the station master's house is shown nearby. No sidings were present and the term 'Sourden Siding' may have referred to the truncated line. The old station's platform may have served as the loading dock for the surviving freight traffic.

By 1903, the buildings at Sourden Siding are no longer shown, the name no longer marked and the 'Orton Section' is recorded as disused.

== The site today ==
The course of the trackbed is still evident, however no buildings remain on the station's site. The Boat of Aikenway ferry across the River Spey has ceased operation.

== Notes ==
Preceding station	Historical railways	Following station
Rothes; Line and station closed	Morayshire Railway	Orton; Line and station closed
