= Birchfield Halt railway station =

Disused railway station in Rothes, Moray

Birchfield

General information
- Location: Rothes, Moray; Scotland
- Coordinates: 57.5631°N 3.2468°W
- Grid reference: NJ255532
- Platforms: 1

Other information
- Status: Disused

History
- Original company: Morayshire Railway
- Pre-grouping: Great North of Scotland Railway
- Post-grouping: LNER

Key dates
- Circa 1871: Opened
- 7 May 1956: Station closed
- 6 May 1968: Line closed to freight
Location

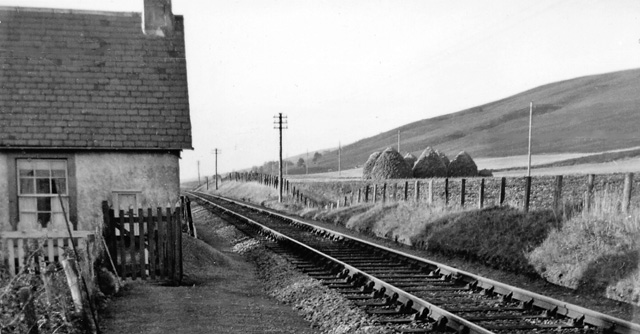
Close to the site of Birchfield Platform in 1961

Birchfield Platform railway station, Birchfield Halt railway station or Birchfield Siding railway station served the rural area near Glen of Rothes House, Moray, Scotland, from 1871 to 1956 on the Morayshire Railway. 1884 is another suggested opening date; however, it contradicts the map evidence. This was an intermediate station on the Craigellachie-Elgin line of the former Great North of Scotland Railway that had originally been opened by the Morayshire Railway on 1 January 1862.

== History ==
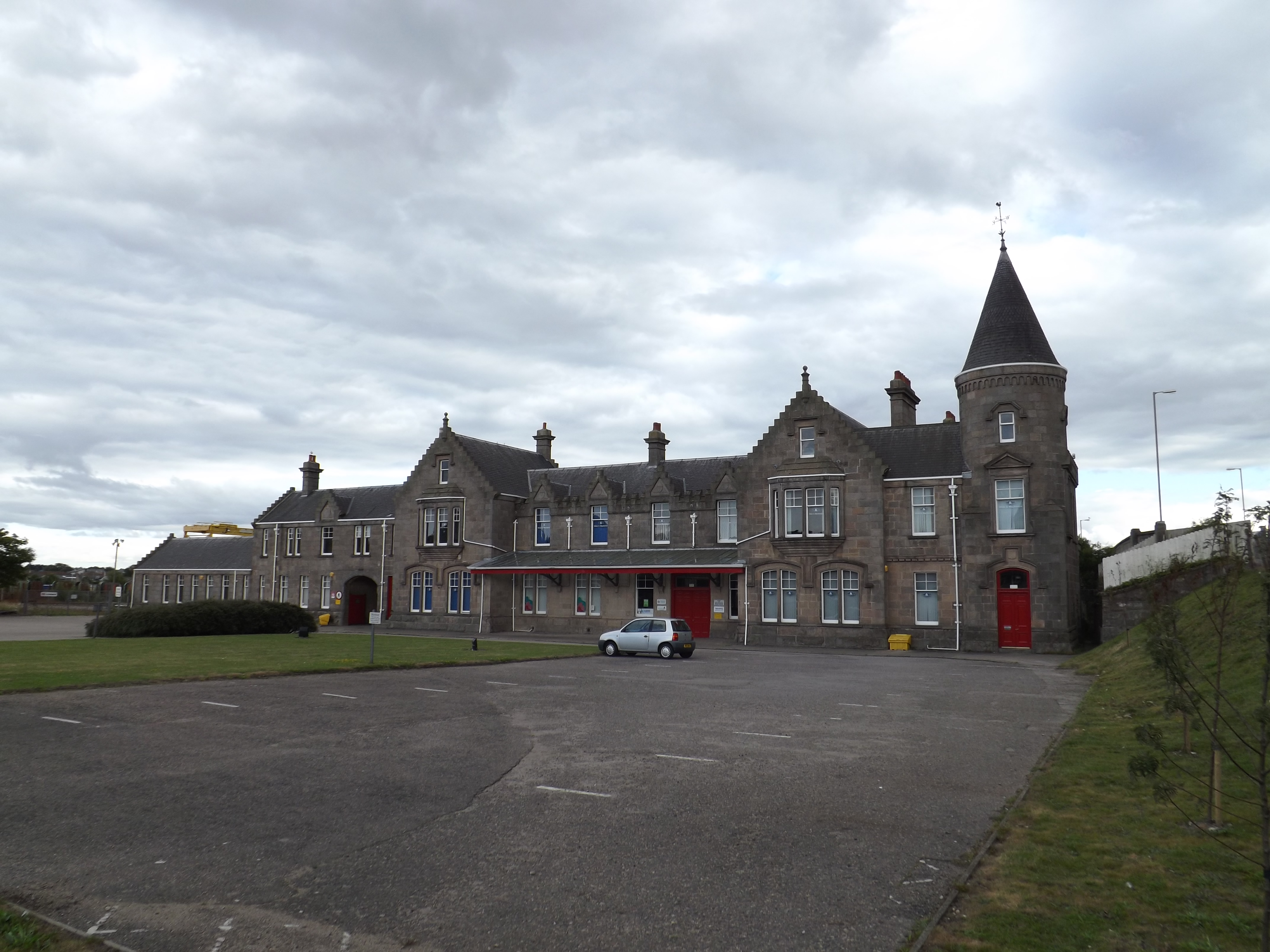
Elgin's old GNoSR railway station

The station was opened circa 1871 as Birchfield Halt by the Great North of Scotland Railway. It was situated north of Rothes and south of Longmorn and Coleburn stations that in turn led to the Great North of Scotland Railway station at Elgin East. The name Birchfield Halt was used from 1939.

== Infrastructure ==
In 1871 the station had a short ill-defined platform and was approached by a long drive that had a junction with the lane that crossed the level crossing. A single siding ran for a short distance south, parallel to the line. A building stood close to the level crossing and a signal was present. By 1903 a shelter was located at the clearly marked platform, but the short siding had been lifted, a signal is no longer indicated and a small building, not marked as a signal box, stands near the site of the level crossing.

== The site today ==
The building first recorded in 1871 is still present in a much modified form and the trackbed is in use as a farmland access.

== Notes ==
| Preceding station | Historical railways | Following station |
|---|---|---|
| Coleburn; Line and station closed | Morayshire Railway | Rothes; Line and station closed |
