= Rothes railway station =

Disused railway station in Rothes, Moray

Rothes
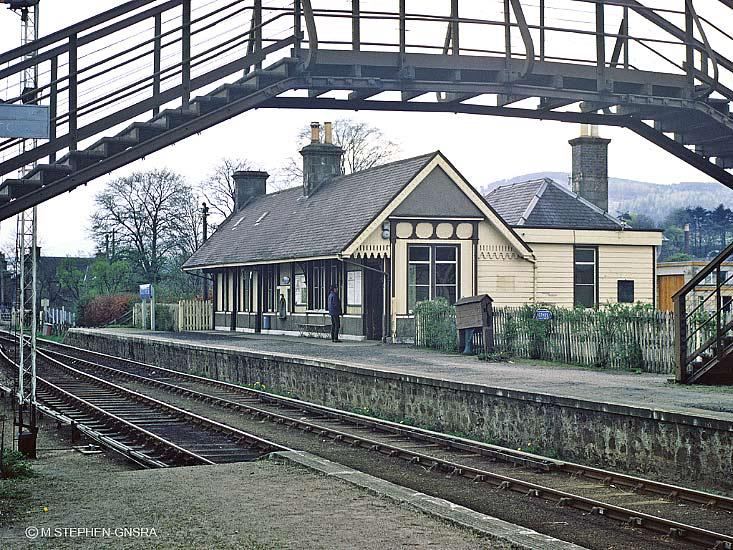
- The station in 1968

General information
- Location: Rothes, Moray; Scotland
- Coordinates: 57.5285°N 3.2064°W
- Grid reference: NJ278493
- Platforms: 1 (initially); 2 (later added)

Other information
- Status: Disused

History
- Original company: Morayshire Railway
- Pre-grouping: Great North of Scotland Railway
- Post-grouping: London and North Eastern Railway; British Rail (Scottish Region)

Key dates
- 23 August 1858: Opened
- 6 May 1968: Closed
Location

Rothes railway station served the town of Rothes, Moray, Scotland from 1858 to 1968 on the Morayshire Railway.

== History ==
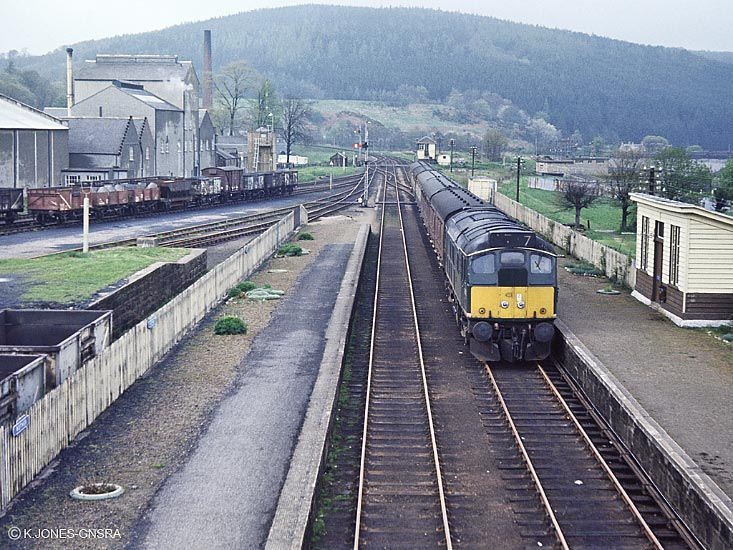
Rothes station in 1968

The station opened on 23 August 1858 by the Morayshire Railway. To the west was a goods yard which started small, but was later enlarged when a platform to Elgin East was added. The station closed to both passengers and goods traffic on 6 May 1968.

Preceding station	Disused railways	Following station
Birchfield Halt; Line and station closed	Morayshire Railway	Dandaleith; Line and station closed
Rothes; Line and station closed	Morayshire Railway	Sourden; Line and station closed
