= Grant Hall (disambiguation) =

Grant Hall (born 1991) is an English footballer

Grant Hall may also refer to:

- Grant Hall (Queen's University), a landmark on the campus of Queen's University, Kingston, Ontario, Canada
- Grant Hall, Rothes, a community hall in Rothes, Scotland
- Grant Hall, the symbol of Fort Leavenworth and headquarters of the U.S. Army Combined Arms Center
- Grant Hall, formerly cadet mess hall, now social center at West Point, the United States Military Academy

== See also ==
- Grant Building (disambiguation)
