= Rifle Range Halt (Morayshire) railway station =

Disused railway station in Lossiemouth, Morayshire

Coordinates: 57.70778°N 3.28311°W

Rifle Range Halt (Morayshire)

General information
- Location: Lossiemouth, Moray; Scotland
- Platforms: 1

Other information
- Status: Disused

History
- Original company: LNER
- Post-grouping: LNER; British Railways (Scottish Region)

Key dates
- 1926: Opened
- 1950: Closed
Location

Rifle Range Halt railway station (Morayshire) served the town of Lossiemouth, Moray, Scotland from 1926 to 1950 on the Morayshire Railway.

== History ==
The station opened by the London and North Eastern Railway and was in use in 1926. It primarily served a rifle range east of the halt, hence the name. It closed in 1950. The trackbed survived after the vegetation was cleared.

Preceding station	Disused railways	Following station
Lossiemouth; Line and station closed	London and North Eastern Railway; Morayshire Railway	Greens of Drainie; Line and station closed
