= Lossiemouth railway station =

Disused railway station in Lossiemouth, Moray

Lossiemouth
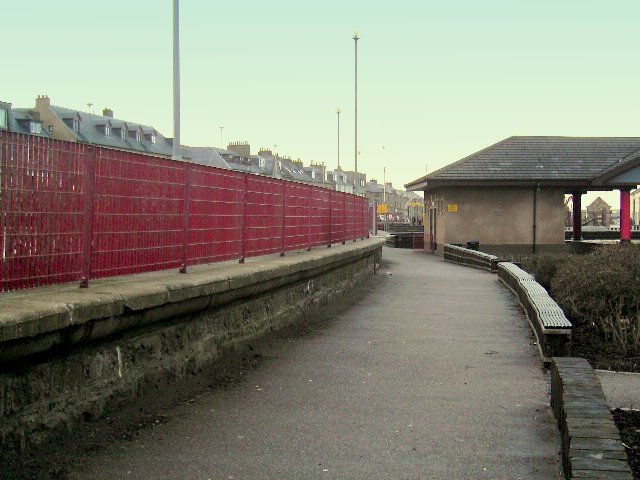
- The former railway line at Lossiemouth

General information
- Location: Lossiemouth, Moray; Scotland
- Coordinates: 57.7207°N 3.2802°W
- Grid reference: NJ238708
- Platforms: 1

Other information
- Status: Disused

History
- Original company: Morayshire Railway
- Pre-grouping: Great North of Scotland Railway
- Post-grouping: LNER

Key dates
- 10 August 1852: Opened
- 6 April 1964: Closed
Location

Lossiemouth railway station served the town of Lossiemouth, Moray, Scotland from 1852 to 1964 on the Morayshire Railway.

== History ==
The station opened on 10 August 1852 by the Morayshire Railway. It was the northern terminus of the line. It closed to both passengers and goods traffic on 6 April 1964. The station building was demolished and the site was replaced with a playground, a bandstand. The platform still survives.

Preceding station	Disused railways	Following station
Terminus	Morayshire Railway	Rifle Range Halt (Morayshire); Line and station closed
