= Coleburn railway station =

Disused railway station in Coleburn, Moray

Coleburn

General information
- Location: Coleburn, Moray; Scotland
- Coordinates: 57.5797°N 3.2675°W
- Grid reference: NJ243551
- Platforms: 2

Other information
- Status: Disused

History
- Original company: Great North of Scotland Railway
- Pre-grouping: Great North of Scotland Railway
- Post-grouping: LNER

Key dates
- 5 June 1863: Opened as Coleburn's Platform
- April 1867: Closed as public station but became private
- July 1926: Closed
Location

Coleburn railway station served the area of Coleburn, Moray, Scotland from 1863 to 1926 on the Morayshire Railway.

== History ==
The station opened on 5 June 1863 as Coleburn's Platform by the Great North of Scotland Railway. . The station closed for regular passenger service in April 1867 but remained available as a private station with trains stopping on request. It closed again for good in July 1926.

Preceding station	Historical railways	Following station
Birchfield Halt; Line and station closed	Great North of Scotland Railway	Longmorn; Line and station closed
