= Greens of Drainie railway station =

Former railway station in Scotland

Greens of Drainie

General information
- Location: Lossiemouth, Moray; Scotland
- Coordinates: 57.6963°N 3.2849°W
- Grid reference: NJ235681
- Platforms: 1

Other information
- Status: Disused

History
- Original company: Morayshire Railway
- Pre-grouping: Great North of Scotland Railway

Key dates
- 10 August 1852: Station opened
- December 1859: Station closed to passengers and goods traffic
Location

Greens of Drainie railway station served the local farms of Greens, Wester Greens, Easter Greens, etc. in the parish of Drainie, Lossiemouth area, Moray, Scotland from 1852 to 1859 on the Morayshire Railway.

== History ==
The station was opened on 10 August 1852 by the Morayshire Railway. It was closed to passengers traffic in December 1859. One reference gives its dates as 1853 to 1898 with it remaining as an unadvertised halt from 1859. The ruins of Spynie Palace stand a mile and a half to the south of the old station. The line closed to both passengers and goods traffic on 6 April 1964. One reference gives goods traffic continuing on the line until 1966.

== Infrastructure ==
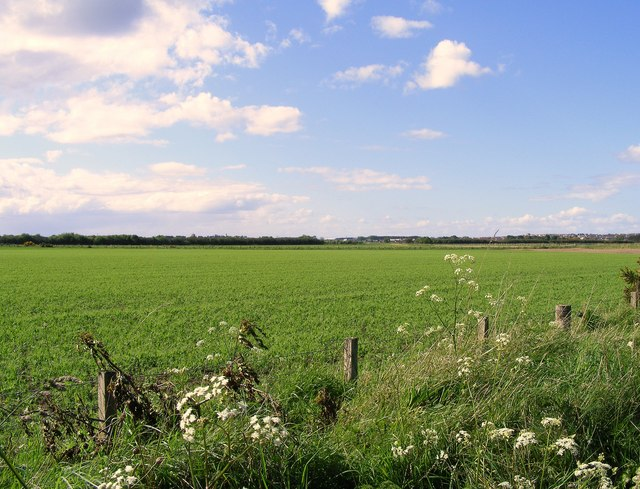
View towards Lossiemouth from Easter Greens.

Greens of Drainie was located on a single track line with one very short platform on the west side of the track closest to Wester Greens Farm. In 1870 the platform was marked on the OS map lying between a drainage ditch and the road running to Wester Greens Farm. No signalling, buildings or sidings are shown on OS maps.

== Remains ==
Nothing now remains of the station, however most of the old trackbed can be walked.

Preceding station	Historical railways	Following station
Rifle Range Halt (Morayshire); Line and station closed	Morayshire Railway	Linksfield; Line and station closed
