= Speyside High School =

Speyside High School may refer to:

- Speyside High School, Tobago, twinned with Hornsey Secondary School for Girls; see List of schools in Trinidad and Tobago
- Speyside High School, Aberlour, Moray, Scotland
