= Linksfield railway station =

Former railway station in Scotland

Linksfield Level Crossing

General information
- Location: Elgin, Moray; Scotland
- Coordinates: 57.6651°N 3.2906°W
- Grid reference: NJ231646
- Platforms: 1

Other information
- Status: Disused

History
- Original company: Morayshire Railway
- Pre-grouping: Great North of Scotland Railway

Key dates
- 10 August 1852: Station opened
- December 1859: Station closed to passengers and goods traffic
Location

Linksfield Level Crossing railway station or Linksfield railway station served the local rural area just north of Elgin, Moray, Scotland from 1852 to 1859 on the Morayshire Railway. The line joined the Moray Coast Railway at Lossie Junction and trains ran on to the old Elgin (East) railway station.

== History ==
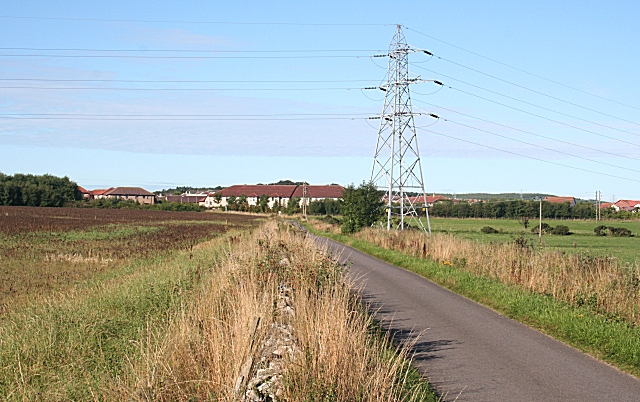
Linksfield seen from just to the west of the old station.

The station was opened on 10 August 1852 by the Morayshire Railway and was closed to passengers in December 1859. One reference gives its dates as 1853 to 1898 with it remaining as an unadvertised halt from 1859. The line closed to both passengers and goods traffic on 6 April 1964. One reference gives goods traffic continuing on the line until 1966.

== Infrastructure ==
Linksfield Level Crossing was a halt located about half a mile north of Lossie Junction on a single track line with one very short platform on the east side of the track. In 1870 the platform was marked on the OS map lying just south of a level crossing that once stood near Maryfield and Muir of Linksfield Farms. The old gatehouse for Spynie House stands opposite and the presence of the estate may have been expected to create enough passenger traffic to justify a station in 1852.

No signalling or sidings are shown on OS maps at the station, however a building is shown that may have been a shelter for the crossing keeper and a signal for Lossie Junction lay to the south. A small square building is shown near the 1/2 mile post on the east side of the track.

== Remains ==
Nothing now remains of the station, however much of the old trackbed towards Lossiemouth can be walked.

== Sources ==
- Maxtone, G.R. (2005). The Railways of the Banff & Moray Coast. Keith & Dufftown Railway Association. ISBN 0-9547346-1-0.

Preceding station	Historical railways	Following station
Greens of Drainie; Line and station closed	Morayshire Railway	Elgin East; Line and station closed
