= Grant Building =

Grant Building may mean:

- Nelson Building, also known as Grant Building, in Los Angeles
- Grant Building (Pittsburgh)
- Grant Building (Washington DC)

== See also ==
- Grant Hall (disambiguation)
