= Longmorn railway station =

Disused railway station in Longmorn, Moray

Longmorn
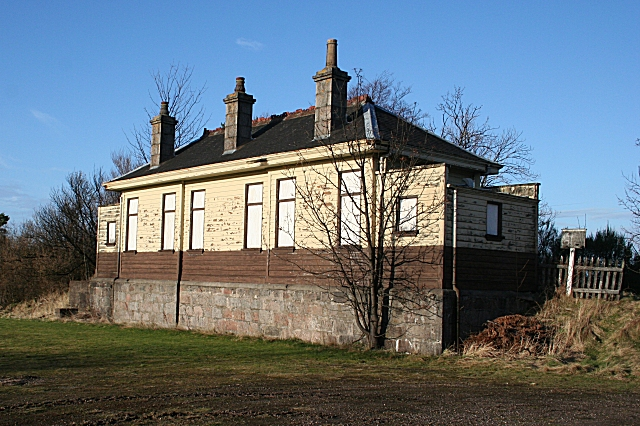

General information
- Location: Longmorn, Moray; Scotland
- Coordinates: 57.6092°N 3.2818°W
- Grid reference: NJ235584
- Platforms: 2

Other information
- Status: Disused

History
- Original company: Morayshire Railway
- Pre-grouping: Great North of Scotland Railway
- Post-grouping: LNER

Key dates
- 1 March 1862: Opened
- 6 May 1968: Closed
Location

Longmorn railway station served the village of Longmorn, Moray, Scotland from 1862 to 1968 on the Morayshire Railway.

== History ==
The station opened on 1 March 1862 by the Morayshire Railway. On the northbound platform was the station building. To the west was the goods yard and to the northwest was the signal box. The goods yard served the Longmorn, Benriach and Glenlossie distilleries. The signal box closed in 1967. The station closed to both passengers and goods traffic on 6 May 1968.

Preceding station	Disused railways	Following station
Elgin (East); Line and station closed	Morayshire Railway	Coleburn; Line and station closed
