= Grant Hall, Rothes =

Municipal building in Rothes, Scotland

Grant Hall
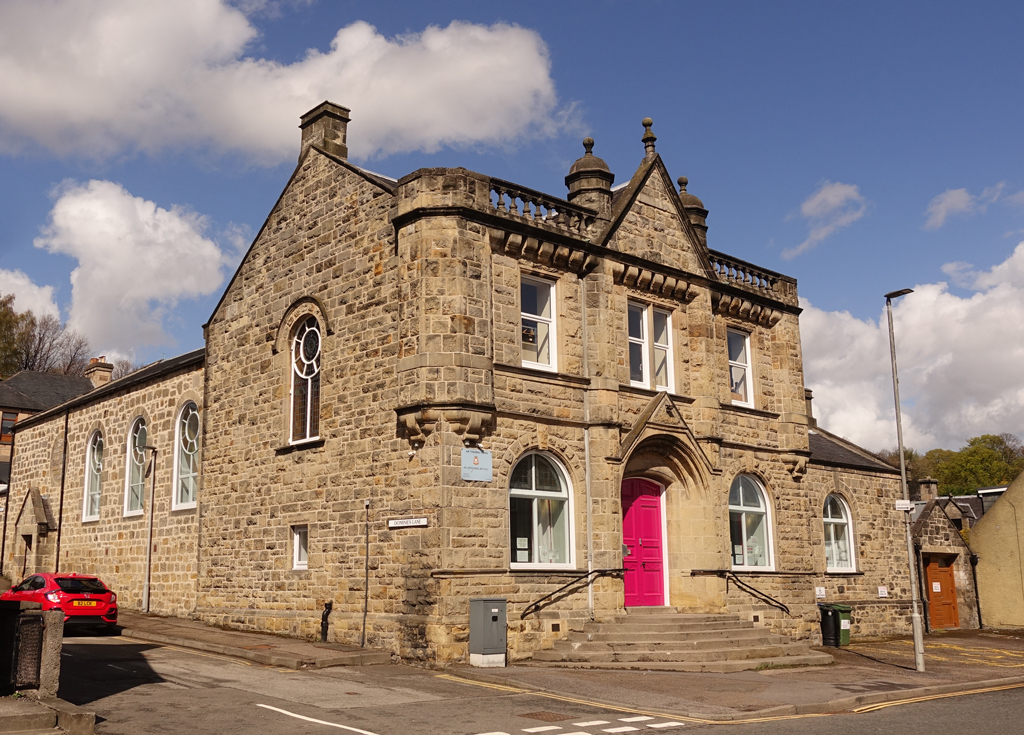
- Grant Hall

- Shown in Moray
- 57.5289°N 3.2086°W
- Location: New Street, Rothes

History
- Built: 1900

Site notes
- Architect: Robert Baillie Pratt
- Architectural style: Neoclassical style

Grant Hall, formerly Rothes Town Hall, is a municipal building in New Street, Rothes, Moray, Scotland. The structure is currently used as a community events venue.

== History ==
Following significant population growth, largely associated with the local whisky industry, the area became a police burgh in 1863. In this context, a group of local businessmen decided to form a company, The Town Hall (Rothes) Limited, to finance and build a town hall for the area: the site they chose was on the west side of New Street. The foundation stone for the new building was laid by Mrs Grant, the wife of Major James Grant, the proprietor of Glen Grant Distillery, on 4 June 1898. The new building was designed by Robert Baillie Pratt of Elgin in the neoclassical style, built in rubble masonry and was completed in 1900.

The design involved a symmetrical main frontage of three bays facing New Street. The central bay, which slightly projected forward, featured a segmental doorway with a gablet roof on the ground floor and a bi-partite window on the first floor. The outer bays were fenestrated by round headed windows with voussoirs and keystones on the ground floor and by single windows on the first floor. At roof level, there was a modillioned cornice and a balustraded parapet which was broken by a central triangular pediment with finials at its apex and on each side of the pediment. There was also a single-storey block on the right-hand side. Internally, the principal room was the main assembly hall which stretched out behind the main frontage.

In August 1900, the proprietor of the Seafield Estates, Caroline Stuart, Countess of Seafield, opened a bazaar intended to repay the debt of £800 incurred by the company that had commissioned the town hall; she also used the occasion to give a significant additional donation for the poor of the parish. On 16 May 1901, Major Grant used the town hall as a venue to present medals to local service personnel who had served in the Second Boer War. Then, on 26 September 1906, the Chancellor of the Exchequer, H. H. Asquith, also visited the town hall, to open another bazaar, this time intended to repay the debt on a temperance hall.

During the First World War, the building was used as drill hall by "D" Company, 6th battalion, the Queen's Own Cameron Highlanders. The company which had commissioned the town hall got into financial difficulty in 1918: the directors sold the building to the Territorial Force Association and liquidated the company in February 1921. An indoor shooting range and garaging for military vehicles were added to the building at that time. Although another member of the Grant family, Janet Grant, donated £2,000 for a new town hall to be called "The Grant Hall" in 1933, that initiative never came to fruition. After the existing building ceased to be used as a drill hall in the 1960s, the condition of the fabric deteriorated and the building became dilapidated.

The Rothes and District Community Association, which had been formed in 1968, acquired the building in the early 1970s for £1,400. After an extensive programme of refurbishment works, the building re-opened as "The Grant Hall Community Centre" in 1977. The cost of operating the building was subsequently subsidised by an annual grant from Grampian Regional Council. However, following the introduction of unitary authorities in 1996, the newly-formed Moray Council withdrew the annual funding and decided to hand the building over the community, allowing it to continue to be used as a community events venue known as "Grant Hall".

A further programme of refurbishment works costing £250,000 was completed with support from the National Lottery Community Fund in 2003. Subsequent users of the building included 423 (Speyside) Detached Flight Squadron, Air Training Corps.
