= Speyside High School, Aberlour =

Coordinates: 57.47092°N 3.21924°W

Speyside High School

Location
- Mary Avenue; Aberlour, Moray, AB38 9QU; United Kingdom

Information
- Type: Secondary school
- Local authority: Moray
- Rector: Patricia Goodbrand
- Deputy Rectors: Helen Duffy; Amy MacInnes; Ed Picksley
- Staff: 35 teachers
- Gender: All
- Age: 11 to 18

Speyside High School is a secondary school in Aberlour, Moray. It serves the areas of Aberlour, Archiestown, Craigellachie, Dufftown, Rothes, Tomintoul and Glenlivet.
