= Rothes =

Rothes: Scottish Gaelic: Ràthais
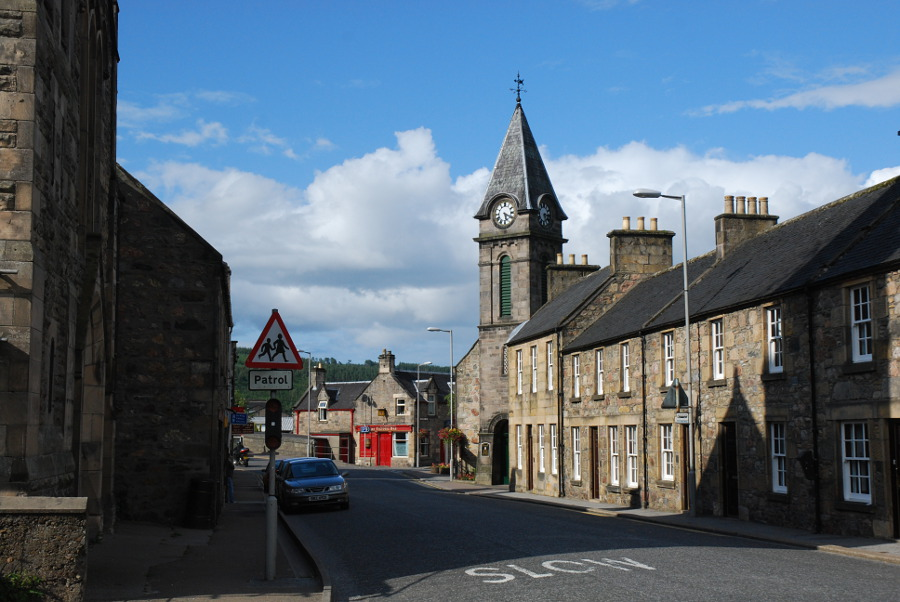
- High Street, Rothes

- Location within Moray
- Population: 1,160 (2020)
- Demonym: Rothesian
- OS grid reference: NJ278492
- Council area: Moray
- Lieutenancy area: Moray
- Country: Scotland
- Sovereign state: United Kingdom
- Post town: ABERLOUR
- Postcode district: AB38
- Dialling code: 01340
- Police: Scotland
- Fire: Scottish
- Ambulance: Scottish
- UK Parliament: Moray West, Nairn and Strathspey
- Scottish Parliament: Moray

Rothes (/ˈrɒθɪs/; Scottish Gaelic: Ràthais) is a town in Moray, Scotland, on the banks of the River Spey, 10 miles (16 km) south of Elgin. The town had a population of 1,252 at the 2011 Census. A settlement has been here since AD 600.

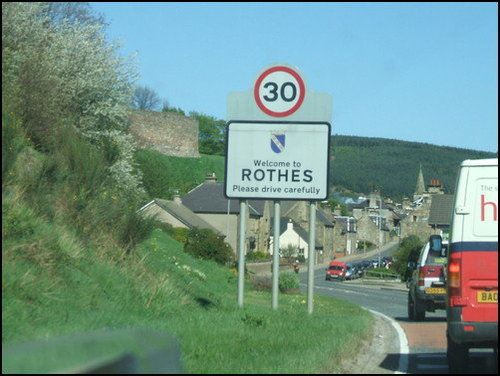
Entering Rothes from the south, with the castle in the background

== History and castle ==
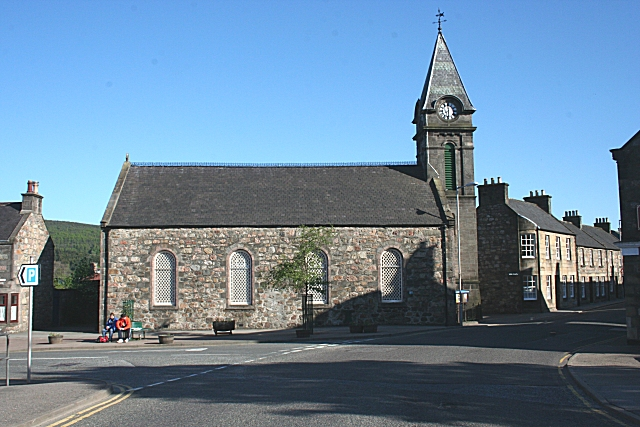
Rothes Parish Kirk

At the south end of the village lie the remains of Rothes Castle (57.5252°N 3.2092°W), built on a hill by Peter de Pollok about 1200 to command traffic up and down this stretch of Strathspey. The castle's remains consist of a fragment of the massive outer wall overlooking the High Street of Rothes town. The castle was four storeys high, with a portcullis guarding the entrance to the inner courtyard and a drawbridge that crossed the dry moat, which ran between the outer wall and the hill on which the castle stood. Sir Norman Leslie, the castle's owner, was host to King Edward I of England on 29 July 1296.

In the 1390s Rothes Castle and its lands were passed to the Leslie family, who would later become the Earls of Rothes. Some of the earliest houses in Rothes were built from stones of the castle, which were taken by villagers to build dwellings after the castle was set alight and destroyed in 1662. The town can clearly be seen on maps even before this date. John Grant of Easter Elchies acquired the estate from John Hamilton-Leslie, 9th Earl of Rothes in 1711. John Grant of Easter Elchies sold his estate to James Ogilvy, 5th Earl of Findlater and 2nd Earl of Seafield shortly thereafter.

An official notice by James Ogilvy, 5th Earl of Findlater and 2nd Earl of Seafield, of intention to feu a town on the Mains of Rothes was placed on 12 December 1763 to the Elginshire Council, and in 1766 the Seafields laid out plans for a crofting township to align north–south along the valley. This forms the genesis of most of the road patterns in Rothes today. The planned town formed a cross to replicate the Saltire in honour of St. Andrew. It overlay its old unplanned predecessor, which can still be seen on the ground. A formal let of 23 tenements by the earl were placed on 1 March 1790.

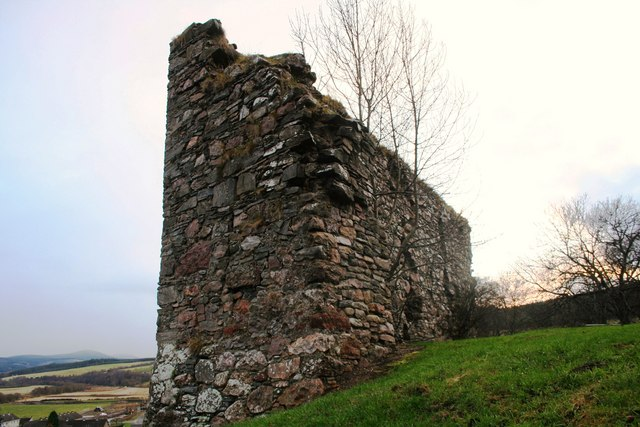
Remains of Rothes Castle

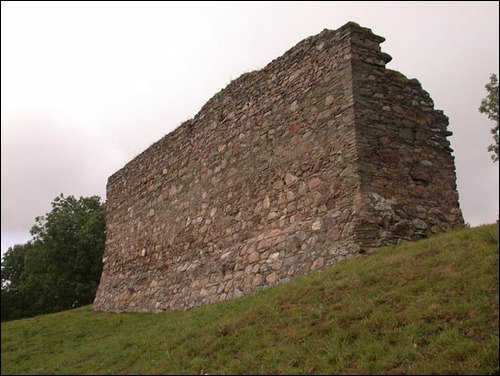
Rothes Castle from the East

== Economy ==
Rothes is home to four distilleries—Speyburn-Glenlivet Distillery, Glen Grant Distillery, Glen Spey Distillery and Glenrothes Distillery. Caperdonich distillery was the fifth in the town but was mothballed in 2002 and demolished in 2010.

Rothes's Glen Grant distillery opened its own bottling plant in 2013. The distillery forms part of the Scotland's Malt Whisky Trail.

The Helius CoRDe Biomass Plant was a joint venture by the Combination of Rothes Distillers Ltd and Helius Energy. It was officially opened by Charles, Duke of Rothesay, on 16 April 2013.

In addition to the distilleries, Forsyths is a major employer in the town. They specialize in fabrication for the oil and gas industry and the alcoholic-beverage industry.

== Transport ==
Before 1968 Rothes had a railway station in the centre of town, which featured staggered platforms and unusual architecture. On the Orton line, it opened to passenger traffic on 23 August 1858 and was served by the Morayshire Railway. An extension to the line, from Rothes to Craigellachie, was opened on 23 December 1858. A new line between Elgin and Rothes was opened to freight on 30 December 1861 and to passengers on 1 January 1862. The Orton line closed on 31 July 1866, and on 4 November 1968 the Elgin to Rothes line was closed to freight and passengers.

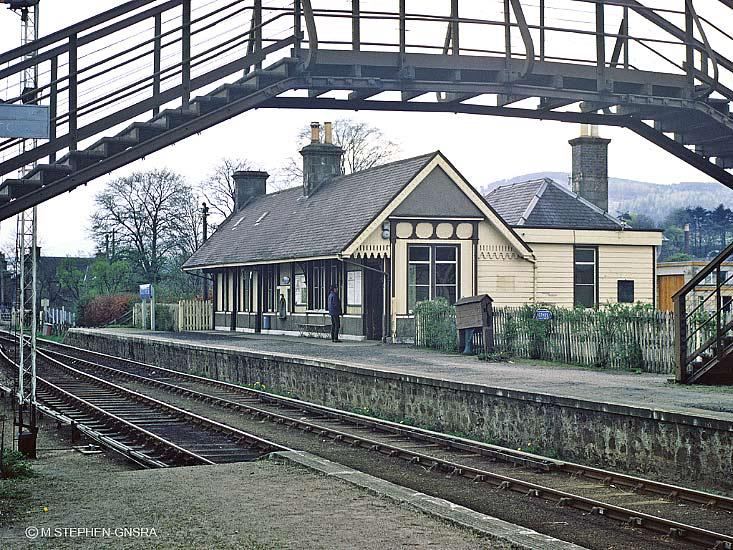
Rothes Railway Station looking south on 27 May 1968, the closure notice is being read.

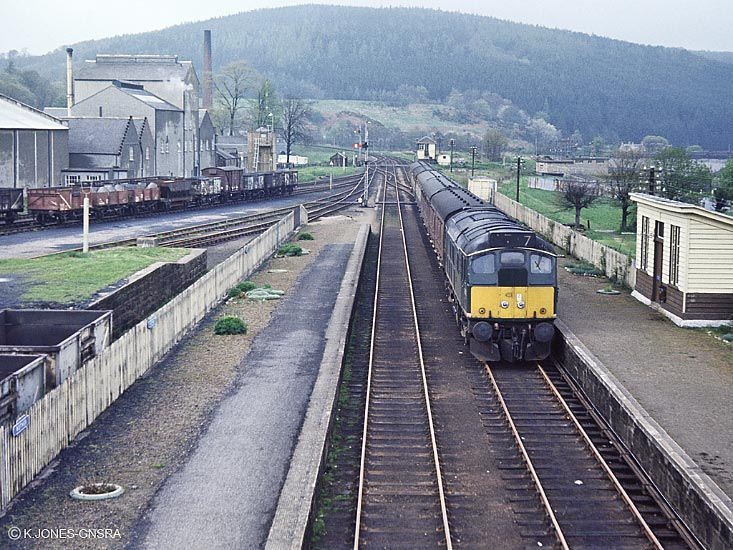
A class 24 arrives at Rothes with a train for Aberdeen in May 1968

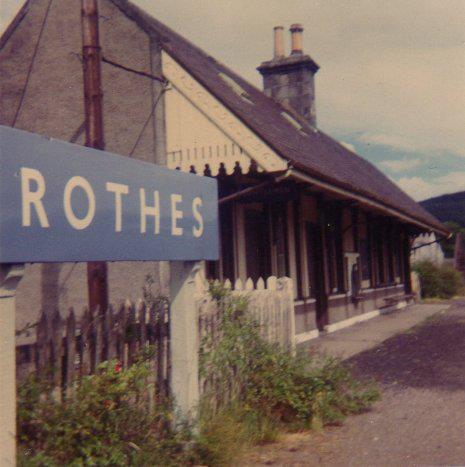
Rothes Railway Station with the Station name

== Sport and leisure ==
Rothes F.C. are the town's senior football team, playing their games at Mackessack Park in the Highland Football League.

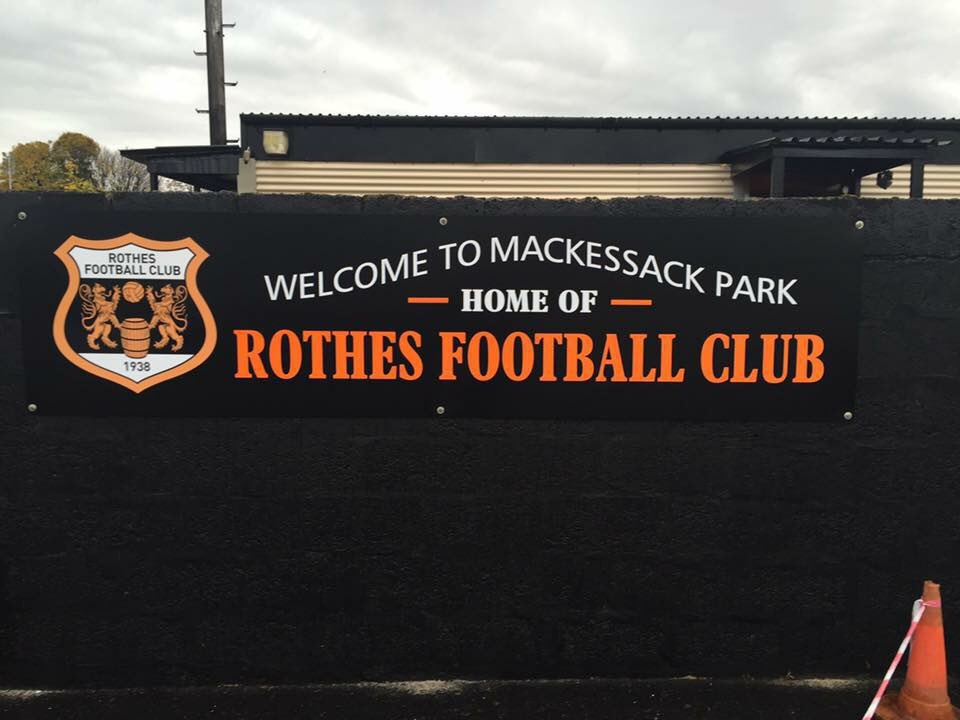
Mackessack Park Entrance

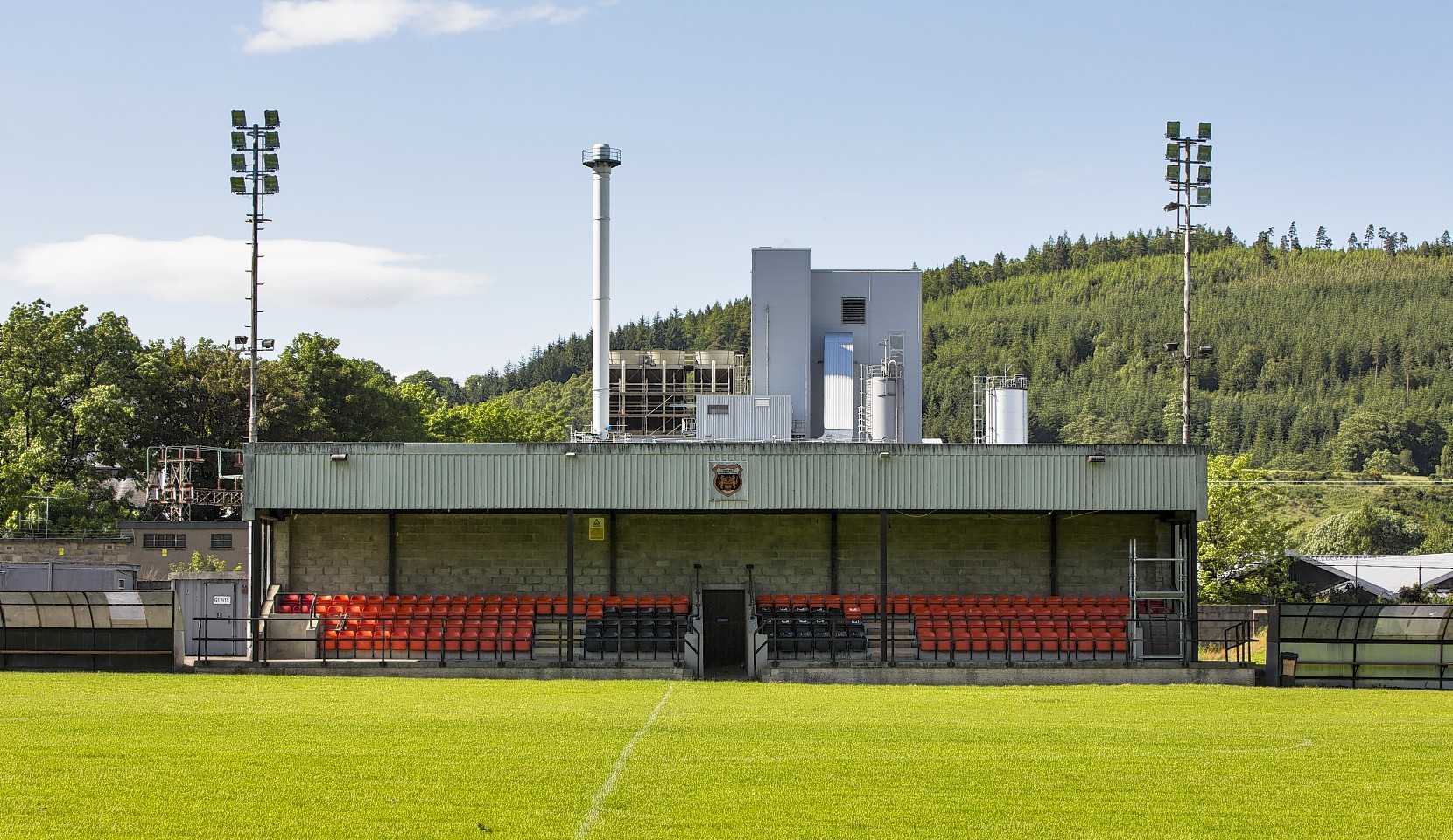
Rothes FCs' Main stand at Mackessack Park

== Other facilities ==
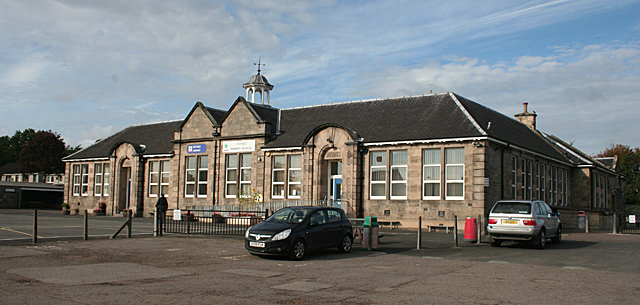
Rothes Primary School

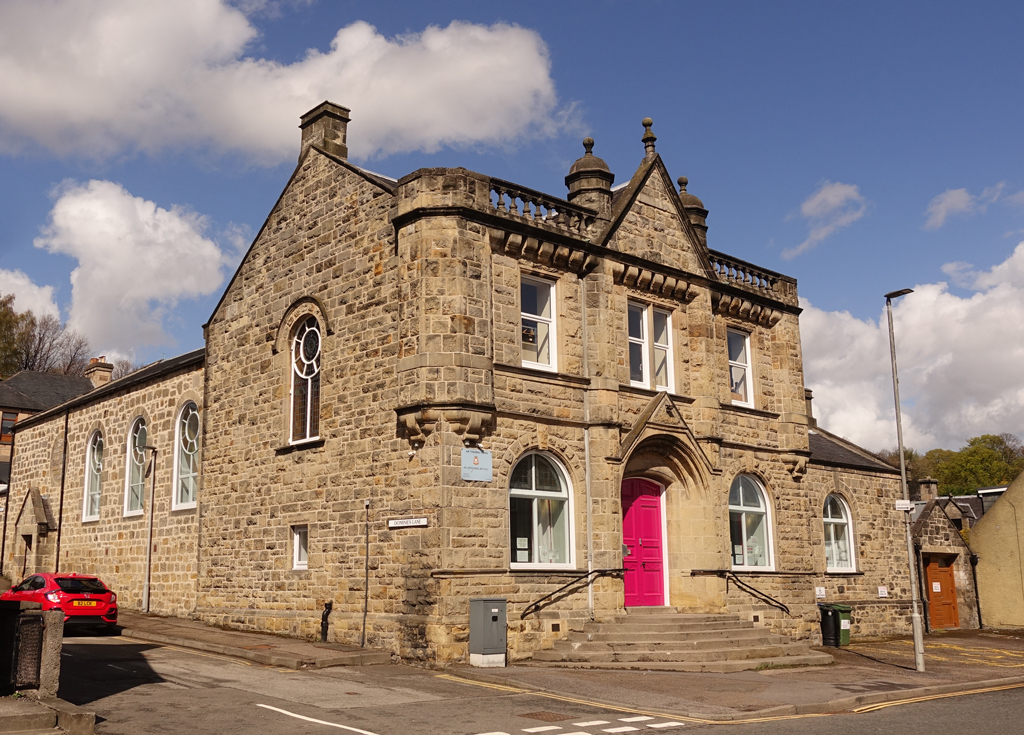
Grant Hall

Rothes Primary School, which opened in 1916, educates the town's children from primary 1 to 7, at which point they further their education at Speyside High School, located 5 miles south in Aberlour.

Grant Hall, formerly Rothes Town Hall, is a community events venue in the town.

== Rothes Flood Alleviation Scheme ==
Rothes has a very long history of flooding. On numerous occasions, houses have been flooded from a combination of the Back Burn, the Burn of Rothes and the Black Burn. The £25 million Rothes Flood Alleviation Scheme was devised to alleviate flooding from these burns. The works were completed in May 2011, £2.4 million under budget.

== Climate ==
Rothes has an oceanic climate typical of Northern Scotland, characterised by relatively mild, damp winters and cool cloudy summers. The area averages 76 air frosts a year. Like much of Europe, Rothes' climate is insulated somewhat by the Gulf Stream, a warm ocean current originating near the gulf of Mexico. This warm ocean current makes Rothes's climate significantly milder during the winter than expected for its latitude.

Climate data for Keith (Nearest climate station to Rothes) 1981–2010
Month	Jan	Feb	Mar	Apr	May	Jun	Jul	Aug	Sep	Oct	Nov	Dec	Year
Mean daily maximum °C (°F)	5.9 (42.6)	6.4 (43.5)	8.4 (47.1)	11.0 (51.8)	13.8 (56.8)	16.0 (60.8)	18.5 (65.3)	18.1 (64.6)	15.6 (60.1)	12.0 (53.6)	8.3 (46.9)	5.7 (42.3)	11.6 (53.0)
Mean daily minimum °C (°F)	−0.6 (30.9)	−0.6 (30.9)	0.8 (33.4)	2.6 (36.7)	4.9 (40.8)	7.8 (46.0)	9.8 (49.6)	9.4 (48.9)	7.2 (45.0)	4.5 (40.1)	1.8 (35.2)	−1.0 (30.2)	3.9 (39.0)
Average precipitation mm (inches)	65.7 (2.59)	57.8 (2.28)	63.2 (2.49)	59.6 (2.35)	60.8 (2.39)	77.8 (3.06)	70.6 (2.78)	75.6 (2.98)	89.2 (3.51)	100.9 (3.97)	91.9 (3.62)	64.7 (2.55)	877.8 (34.57)
Mean monthly sunshine hours	45.9	77.3	108.2	142.2	190.0	152.7	156.8	145.6	117.5	89.6	53.2	35.0	1,314
Source: Met Office

== Notable people ==
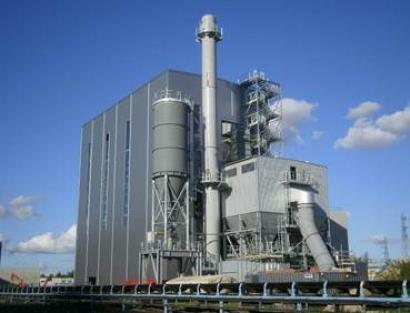
The Helius CoRDe Biomass Plant in Rothes

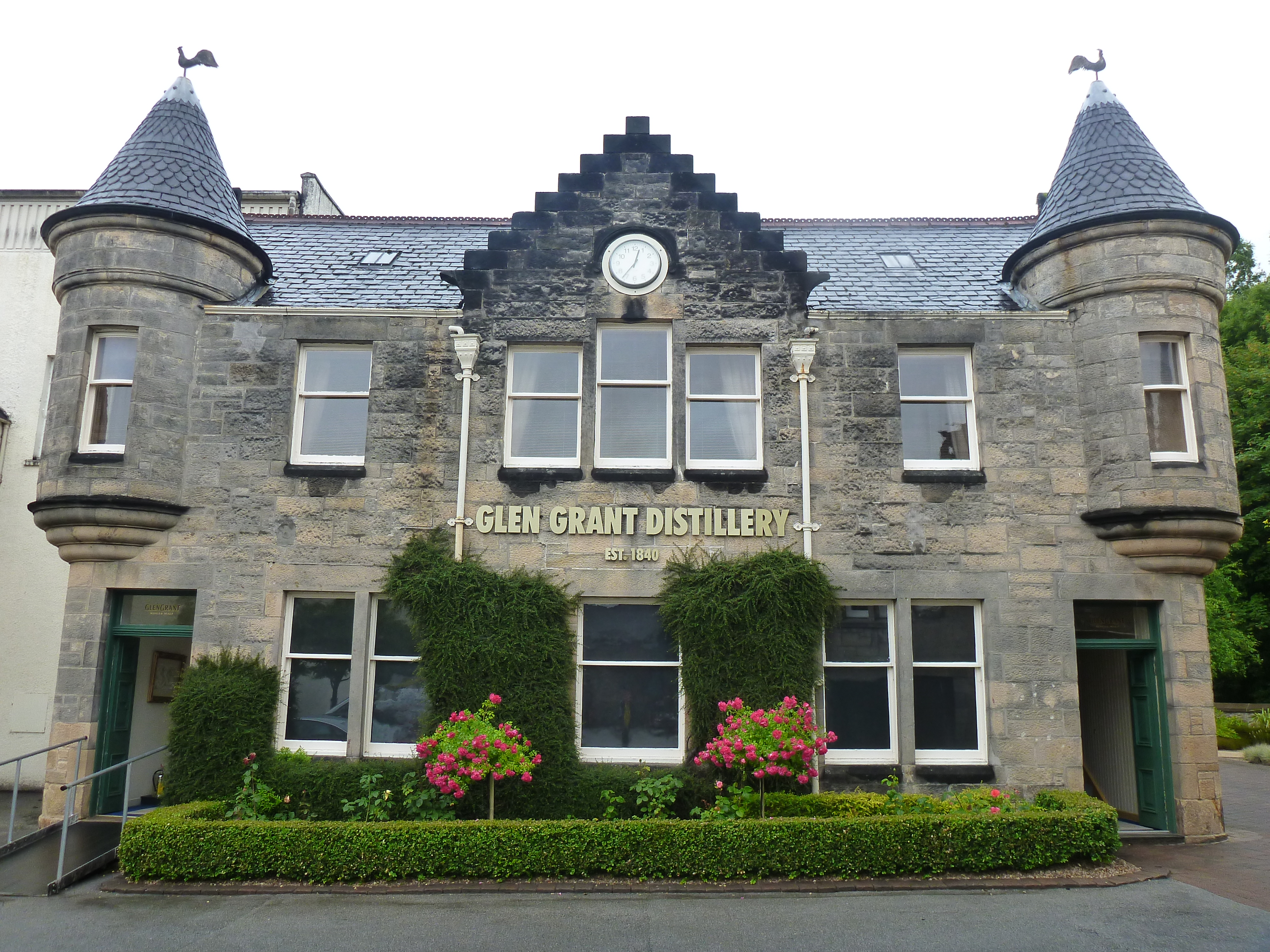
Glen Grant Distillery
- Admiral Sir Martin Eric Dunbar-Nasmith, Royal Navy officer and a recipient of the Victoria Cross, who moved to Rothes in retirement.
- James 'The Major' Grant, eccentric businessman who inherited Glen Grant Distillery in 1872.
- Noël Leslie, Countess of Rothes, born on 25 December 1878 was the wife of the 19th Earl of Rothes. A noted philanthropist and social leader, she was a heroine of the Titanic disaster, famous for taking the tiller of her lifeboat and later helping row the craft to the safety of the rescue ship Carpathia.
