= Orton railway station =

Disused railway station in Orton, Moray

Orton
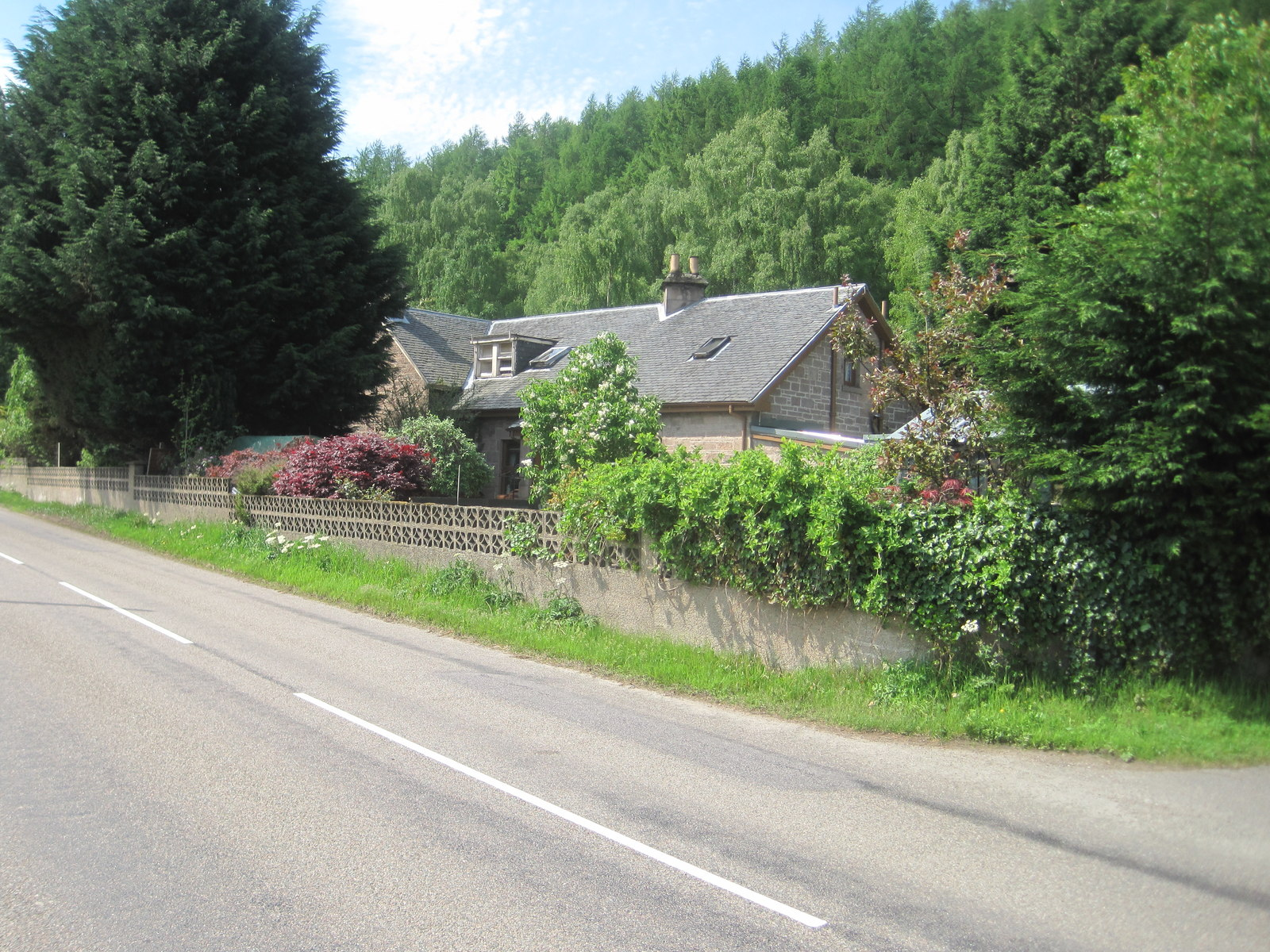
- The site of the station, looking southwest towards Mulben, in 2017

General information
- Location: Orton, Moray; Scotland
- Coordinates: 57.5615°N 3.1517°W
- Grid reference: NJ311529
- Platforms: 2

Other information
- Status: Disused

History
- Original company: Inverness and Aberdeen Junction Railway
- Pre-grouping: Highland Railway
- Post-grouping: London, Midland and Scottish Railway

Key dates
- 18 August 1858: Opened
- 7 December 1964: Closed
Location

Orton railway station served the estate of Orton, Moray, Scotland from 1858 to 1964 on the Inverness and Aberdeen Junction Railway.

== History ==
The station opened on 18 August 1858 by the Inverness and Aberdeen Junction Railway. It closed to both passengers and goods traffic on 7 December 1964.

Preceding station	Historical railways	Following station
Orbliston Junction; Line open, station closed	Inverness and Aberdeen Junction Railway	Mulben; Line open, station closed
