= Morayshire Railway =

Former railway in Scotland

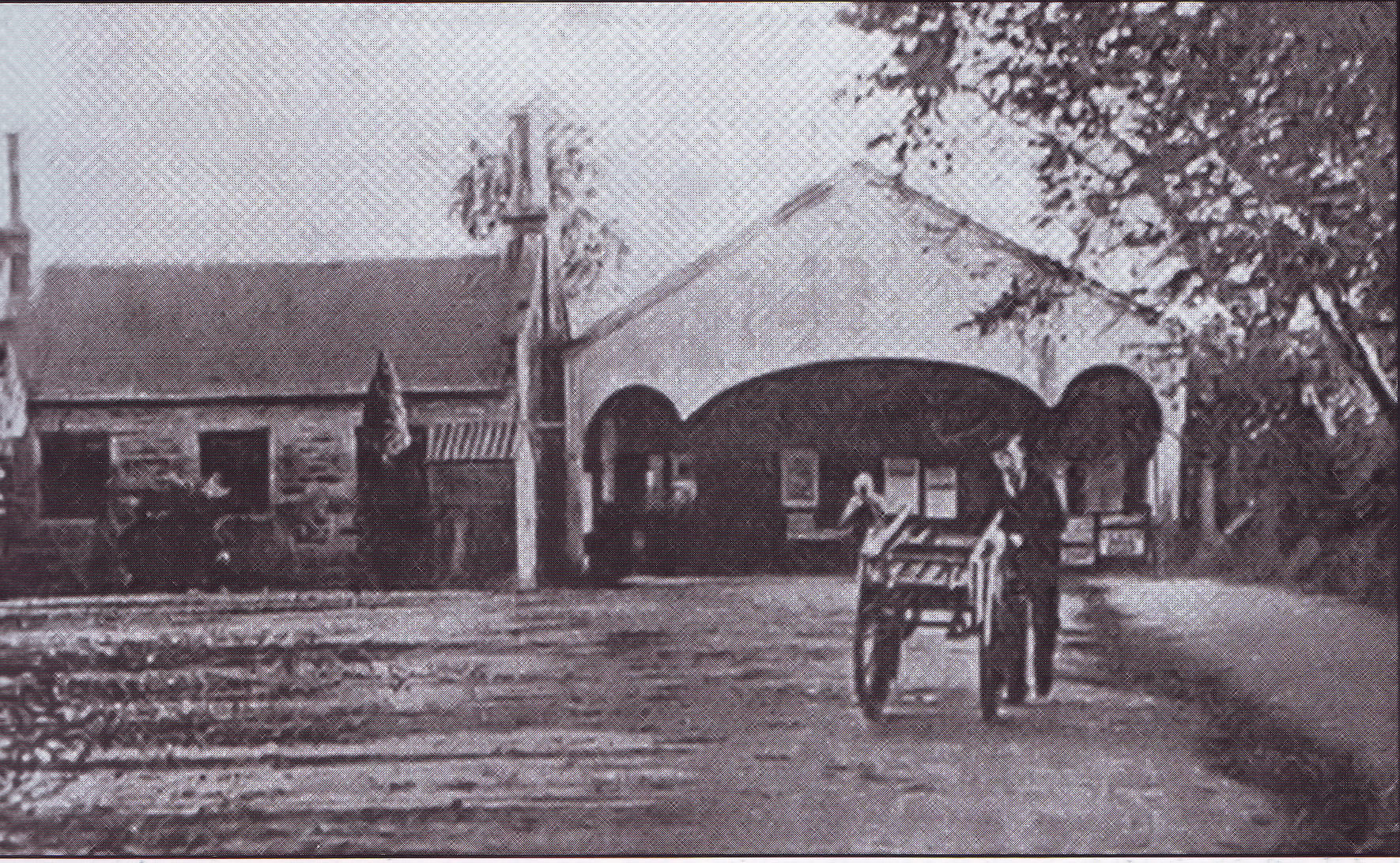
- Original Elgin Station and headquarters

Overview
- Locale: Moray, Scotland
- Stations: 14 (Not all existing at the same time)

History
- Opened: 10 August 1852
- Headquarters: Elgin
- Merged with Great North of Scotland Railway: 1 October 1880

Technical
- Track length: 18 mi (29 km)
- Track gauge: 1,435 mm (4 ft 8 1/2 in) standard gauge

The Morayshire Railway was the first railway to be built north of Aberdeen, Scotland. It received royal assent in 1846, but construction was delayed until 1851 because of the adverse economic conditions existing in the United Kingdom. The railway was built in two phases, with the section from Elgin to Lossiemouth completed in 1852. When the Inverness and Aberdeen Junction Railway (I&AJR) reached Keith via Elgin, the Morayshire was able to complete the Speyside second phase by connecting the Craigellachie line at Orton. Initially, the Morayshire ran its own locomotives on the I&AJR track between Elgin and Orton, but this was short-lived, and the Morayshire carriages were then hauled to Orton by the I&AJR. Disagreements with the I&AJR eventually forced the Morayshire into constructing a new section of track between its stations at Elgin and Rothes; this was completed in 1862. The Morayshire accomplished its final enlargement by connecting to the new Great North of Scotland Railway (GNoSR) Craigellachie station in 1863. Crippling debt forced the company into an arrangement with the GNoSR for it to assume operation of the track in 1866. By 1881, the Morayshire had greatly reduced its liabilities, and its long-sought-after amalgamation with the GNoSR finally took place.

== Elgin to Lossiemouth ==
=== Concept to development ===
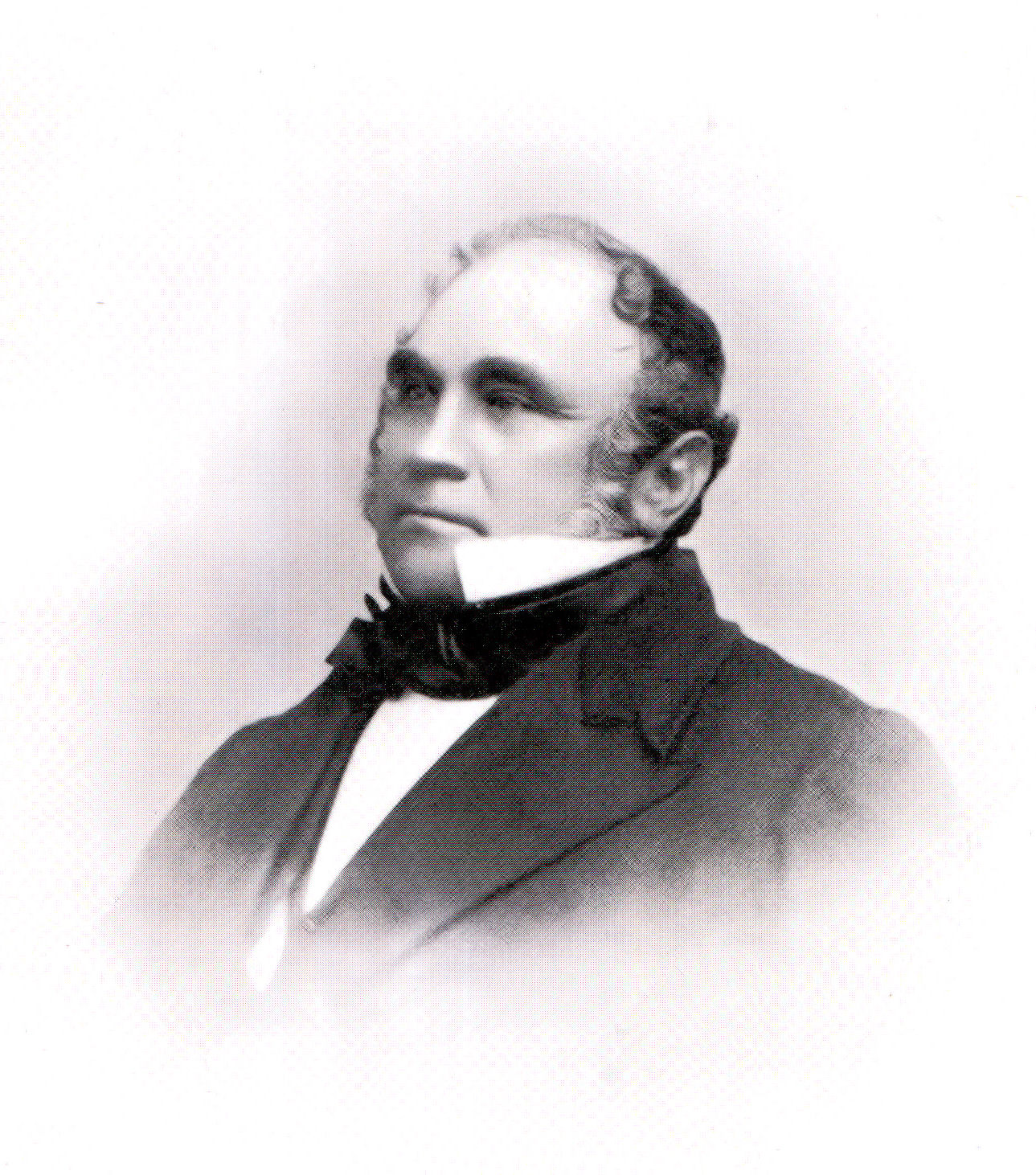
James Grant

James Grant, an Elgin solicitor, later to become Provost of Elgin, and co-owner with his brother of the Glen Grant distillery at Rothes, first envisaged the construction of a railway between Elgin and Lossiemouth in 1841. A ground survey showed that the line was feasible and could be built relatively cheaply, but there was little financial support for the enterprise. On 3 February 1844 and still steadfast in his belief in the project, Grant addressed the board of the Elgin and Lossiemouth Harbour Company to gain their support—the board's opinion was that there was little need for railways north of Dundee, let alone one between the two towns. Following the harbour company's own investigation, it changed its opinion and gave it its backing.

In the mid-1840s, railway mania swept throughout the United Kingdom. At a meeting arranged by the supporters of an Inverness to Elgin railway on 19 February 1845, it was generally agreed that such a railway would be beneficial. Grant addressed the meeting, stating that he had no objection but warned the people of Elgin that Lossiemouth harbour was important to Elgin and that they should be wary of companies that could interfere with the free trade that came through the port. These warnings were heeded, and Grant succeeded in resurrecting the scheme as the Morayshire Railway at a meeting held on 3 March 1845. At a further meeting held on 11 April, it was also decided that the track would extend south to Craigellachie.

Morayshire Railway Act 1846
- Act of Parliament
- Parliament of the United Kingdom
- Long title: An Act for making a Railway from Stotfield and Lossiemouth Harbour to Elgin, Rothes, and Craigellachie, to be called "The Morayshire Railway."
- Citation: 9 & 10 Vict. c. clxxviii

Dates
- Royal assent: 16 July 1846

Measures were taken to seek parliamentary authority in 1846, but before the bill was presented, the GNoSR was created. A decision was taken that the two railways would connect at Elgin and the Morayshire Railway would connect its Speyside line to Craigellachie at Orton. The company's capital was agreed at £50,000. (Note: £50,000 in 1841 was worth around £6,222,000 in 2024) The Morayshire Railway Act 1846 (9 & 10 Vict. c. clxxviii) approving this scheme was obtained on 10 July 1846. Still, financial panic gripped the United Kingdom in 1847, and the entire project was shelved. An internal crisis developed within the company following a change of some of the directors. The board declared that powers would be requested to abandon plans for the Craigellachie extension, as there was no sign of the GNoSR starting their scheme. Some Edinburgh based shareholders—with the financial upheaval of the previous few years feared that the entire project was no longer viable—attempted to get the entire railway cancelled at an extraordinary general meeting (EGM) held on 24 February 1851 using the Abandonment of Railways Act 1850 (13 & 14 Vict. c. 83). This motion was carried by 1,800 shares to 677. Provost Grant suspected that due processes had not been observed and protested to the Railway Commissioners, who, on 21 March 1851, called for a list of shareholders who had attended the abandonment EGM. The commissioners found that the necessary shares owned by those attending were insufficient for an abandonment. The Edinburgh shareholders withdrew their support, placing the company in a critical position. The Railway Commissioners granted the abandonment of the Craigellachie section on 10 July and agreed that the company's capital be reduced to £29,700. (Note: £29,700 in 1851 was worth around £4,441,000 in 2024) However, it was not until Elgin Town Council agreed to invest £1,000 (Note: £1,000 in 1851 was worth about £149,600 in 2024) in shares. Colonel Brander of Pitgaveny made a considerable addition to his already substantial holding when the contract for the Elgin to Lossiemouth section was placed.

=== Construction and opening ===
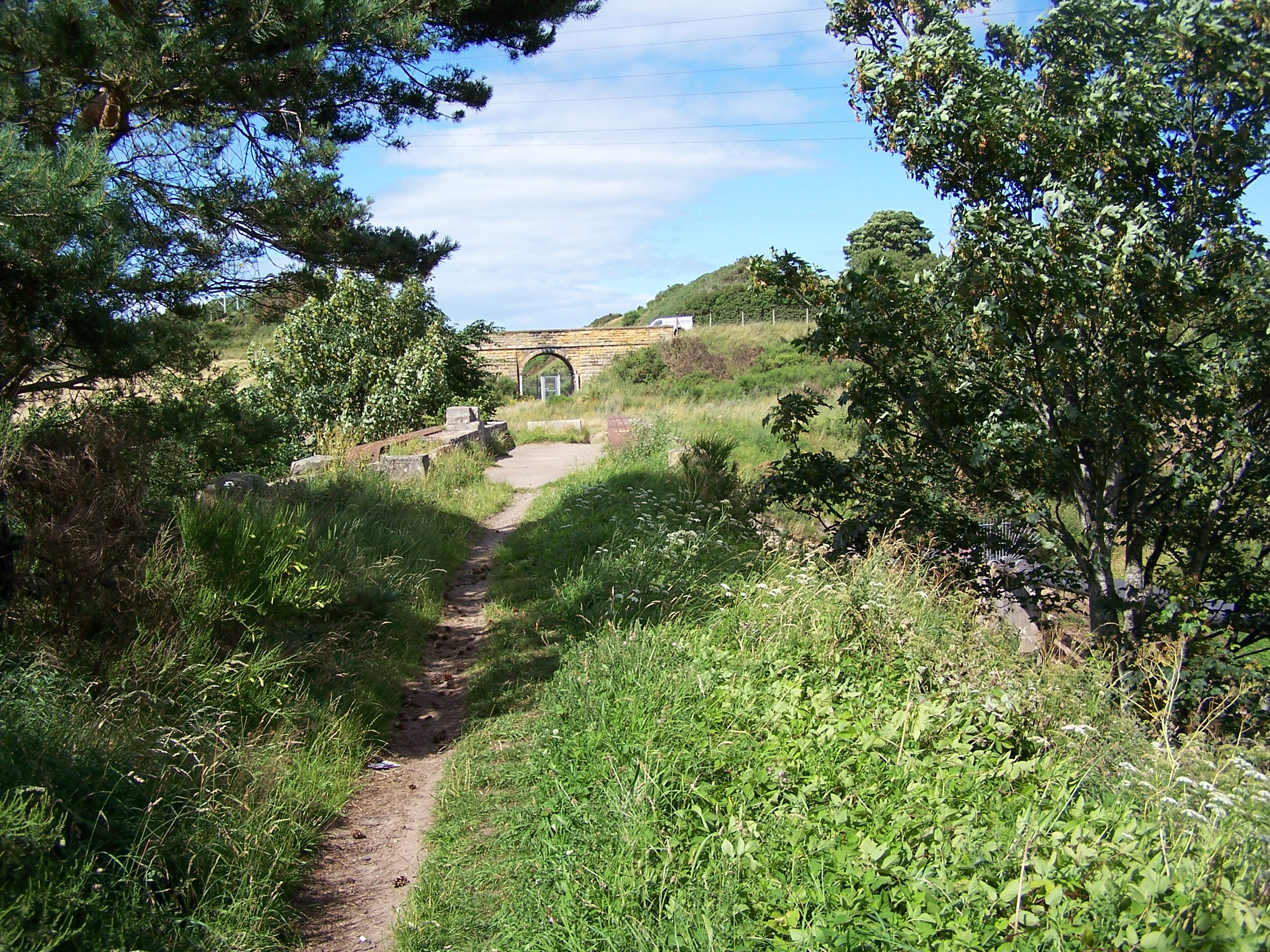
Bareflathills

Hutchings & Co. were awarded the contract and the first sod was cut at Bareflathills just outside Elgin near the River Lossie by the wife of James Grant on Saturday, 30 November 1851. A large cheering crowd gathered to witness the ceremony amid the firing of cannons. This point was chosen because it possessed the three most difficult engineering features to be overcome—the bridge over the River Lossie, the road bridge over the track and the very deep cutting.

The contractor switched to two 12-hour shifts and had a workforce of around 300 navvies. It was reported at the board meeting held on 2 April 1852, that although the track was half-finished a strike within the workforce had provoked a serious disturbance. There were two stories in circulation regarding the incident. The first of these was that Irish navvies had come onto the job, undercutting the locals' wages, and the other was that the contractor, who was from England, employed English labour, and it was they who objected to the Irish. The outcome was that a clash of some sort had taken place and that four of the instigators were arrested and sentenced to various periods of hard labour—a fifth person was to be sent to the Court of Judiciary for trial after assaulting the sheriff. The result of all this was that the Morayshire Railway was ordered to pay for ten additional police constables to regulate the workforce.

It had been decided that the opening date would be Tuesday, 10 August 1852. Still, at the board meeting on 31 July, it was reported that the locomotives had not arrived from Messrs Neilson & Co of Glasgow—a day later, the boat containing the engines docked at Lossiemouth. The two locomotives bought for the line were small 2-2-0 tank engines costing a total of £2,622 7s 8 1/2d, (Note: £2622 in 1852 was worth about £387,500 in 2024) and were named by the company, Elgin and Lossiemouth. The Board of Trade Engineer inspected the line on 4 August and travelled in a locomotive a day later and declared himself satisfied with the railway and rolling stock.

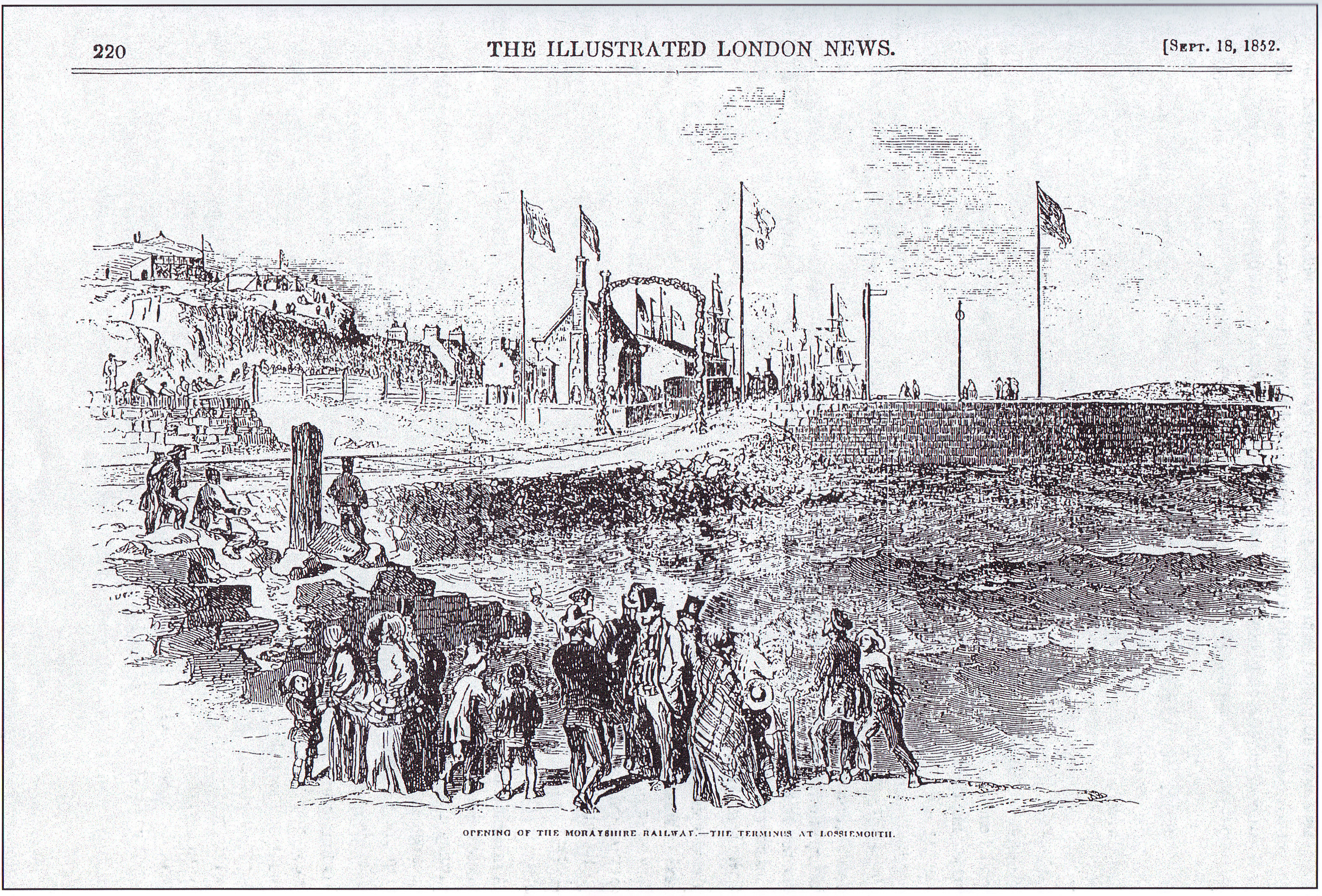
Opening ceremony at Lossiemouth

On 10 August 1852, a general holiday was declared in Elgin and Lossiemouth. The directors of the company, along with other local dignitaries, walked at the head of a procession from the town centre, at St Giles Church, to the station, where, accompanied by celebratory cannon firing, they were given a rousing send-off. Some people instead walked to Lossiemouth to see the train arrive. The board of the Elgin and Lossiemouth Harbour Company met the passengers and escorted them to the recently opened Steamboat and Railway Hotel, where they were entertained. They then proceeded to a large marquee erected overlooking the station on top of the quarry cliffs, where many people made fine speeches before lunch. The celebrations included sports and games. The Board and prominent citizens met later that evening for a commemorative dinner. The trains ran all day until midnight and carried around 3000 passengers.

=== Operation ===
Morayshire Railway (Extension) Act 1856
- Act of Parliament
- Parliament of the United Kingdom
- Long title: An Act to enable the Morayshire Railway Company to construct a Railway from Orton to Craigellachie, and for other Purposes.
- Citation: 19 & 20 Vict. c. lxxxvi

Dates
- Royal assent: 14 July 1856

Text of statute as originally enacted

Morayshire Railway Act 1861
- Act of Parliament
- Parliament of the United Kingdom
- Long title: An Act to enable the Morayshire Railway Company to extend their Railway to the Strathspey Railway; and for other Purposes.
- Citation: 24 & 25 Vict. c. xxx

Dates
- Royal assent: 17 May 1861

Morayshire Railway Act 1863
- Act of Parliament
- Parliament of the United Kingdom
- Long title: An Act to enable the Morayshire Railway Company to raise additional Capital; and for other Purposes.
- Citation: 26 & 27 Vict. c. ccx

Dates
- Royal assent: 28 July 1863

Text of statute as originally enacted

Morayshire Railway Act 1866
- Act of Parliament
- Parliament of the United Kingdom
- Long title: An Act to enable the Morayshire Railway Company to raise Capital by creating new Shares or Stock; and for other Purposes.
- Citation: 29 & 30 Vict. c. xxx

Dates
- Royal assent: 18 May 1866

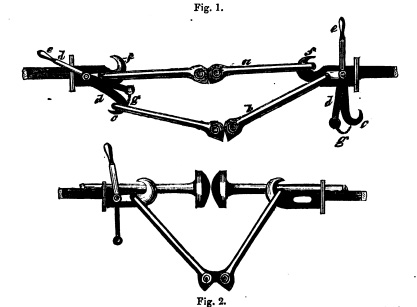
Taylor and Cranstoun's coupling device

The day following the opening event, a regular five return journeys per day, Monday to Saturday, were instituted. Soon after, the frequency was reduced to four return journeys per day, but then in 1857, it was increased to six return journeys, reflecting the increased use of Lossiemouth harbour for exporting and importing materials. It took the trains 15 minutes to run the 5 1/2 miles (9 km), including the conditional stops at Linksfield Level Crossing and Greens of Drainie. These stops were abandoned in 1859.

A first and second class service was provided until 1855, then a first and third thereafter, while the fares were levied at 1 1/2d and 1d per mile respectively. There was little difference in the coach seating layouts, only in the quality of the seats. The first year saw the company run a decent profit, and investors were rewarded with a 5% dividend. However, the dividend in 1858 was halved to 2.5% due to a reduction in revenue caused by the closure of Lossiemouth harbour for four months for basin enlargement. This was discussed at the annual general meeting in the following October—at this meeting, the main instigator of the railway, James Grant, was elected chairman.

Joseph Taylor and Charles Cranstoun, the company's Engineer and General Manager respectively, designed an ingenious device for coupling and uncoupling carriages and locomotives, thereby removing a significant hazard that claimed many lives annually across Britain. It operated very successfully on the Morayshire line and was highly regarded by railway experts, but faced reluctance by other railway companies for its adoption—it is unclear if any other railways also used it. The Mechanics' Magazine, after having seen the device in operation, wrote:

Having this fully made known the nature of this invention, designed and introduced for the express purpose of avoiding one entire and dreadful class of railway accidents, we ask whether railway companies are justified in refusing even to entertain proposals for its adoption? For our part, we hold that by so doing they make themselves accountable, in all right of justice, for every injury or death that hereafter results from the present dangerous and destructive method of carriage-coupling.

— Mechanics Magazine, No. 1731, pp. 341–342 (1856)

Within a short time of co-designing the coupling device, Joseph Taylor was killed in an accident near Oakenhead Bridge just outside Lossiemouth on 23 April 1857. He was driving a tank locomotive which collided with a ballast train. In the same year also near Lossiemouth, a passenger was killed when a badly secured barrier gave way on a truck.

== The Craigellachie enlargement ==
By March 1858, the Inverness and Aberdeen Junction Railway (I&AJR) had reached Elgin and completed its junction with GNoSR at Keith on 18 August. The Morayshire Railway completed the 3 1/2 miles (6 km) of track from Orton station to Rothes and opened to passenger traffic on 23 August 1858—this allowed the Morayshire Railway to resurrect its plans to build a railway between Rothes and Craigellachie and this section was completed on 23 December 1858. It terminated, however, on the west bank of the River Spey so as not to incur the expense of a bridge. The Morayshire company would, under its agreement with the I&AJR, work its own trains on the Elgin – Orton section but without permission to stop for passengers. The engines used by the Morayshire Railway were small and prone to breakdown and unsuitable for the steeper gradients on this section of track—their use lasted only six weeks. The I&AJR blamed the Morayshire for causing delays in its schedules and insisted on the Morayshire coaches being attached to its own and taken to Orton—relations between the two companies deteriorated rapidly and a dispute over charging for line use ensued. Matters came to a head when I&AJR held back the Morayshire Railway goods until the I&AJR goods were ready to be forwarded to or from Orton.

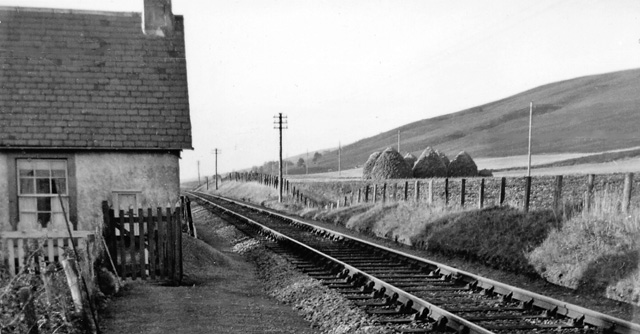
Site of Birchfield Platform in 1961

This caused difficulties with the onward transmission of goods from and to Lossiemouth Harbour. Seemingly deliberate schemes were devised to obstruct the Morayshire coaches from entering onto the I&AJR line. The two companies agreed, and the Morayshire Railway announced to its long-suffering passengers that an agreement had been reached and that delays should no longer happen.

Meanwhile, the Morayshire had borrowed to its limit, its shares were not attracting buyers, and debt levels were high and increasing. Problems with I&AJR re-surfaced, and traffic on the Morayshire line was being severely disrupted—the I&AJR then submitted a bill to the Morayshire Railway for £900 as its share of the construction of Orton station. The Morayshire Railway Company decided to free itself from any involvement with I&AJR and to build a new direct line from Elgin through the Glens of Rothes to meet its own Speyside line. With the levels of debt carried by the company, the brothers James and John Grant loaned the Morayshire £4,500 to help fund the new track. Royal assent was given in 1861, and the work was completed on 1 January 1862. (Note: £4,500 in 1861 was worth about £578,300 in 2024) Two more powerful locomotives, 2-4-0 tank engines, would operate this route as the line was steeply graded for the first 6 of its 9 miles [10 of 15 km]. These were named Glen Grant and Lesmurdie.

At a meeting of the Society of Engineers, in January 1866, a paper was read by Mr W. H. Mills, on the Craigellachie Viaduct. This viaduct was constructed for the purpose of carrying the Morayshire Railway over the River Spey, at Craigellachie, Banffshire, the engineers being Mr Samuel (M.Inst.C.E.) and the author. It consisted of three spans of 57 feet [17 m] each on the north bank, and one span of 200 feet [61 m] over the main channel of the river; ordinary boiler-plate girders constituted the former, and the latter was of wrought iron on the lattice principle. The piers and abutments were of solid ashlar masonry, and the works were arranged for a single line of railway. It appears that excavation for the foundations commenced in May 1862, and the viaduct was opened for public traffic in July 1863. The total cost amounted to £12,199, or equal to £29 10s per lineal foot.

— Annual of Scientific Discovery, for year 1866 and 1867 (Note: £12,199 in 1863 was worth £4,701,000 in 2024)

The dispute with the I&AJR prompted the Morayshire Railway to open negotiations with the GNoSR, which bought £10,000 of shares to help build the direct line to Rothes. (Note: £10,000 in 1861 was worth about £1,285,000 in 2024) The I&AJR viewed the involvement of the GNoSR in the Morayshire as a threat to themselves and, in a tit-for-tat fashion, started work on the Burghead branch to take business from Lossiemouth harbour and thus, goods traffic from the Morayshire. In October 1860, the I&AJR made what appeared to be a last-ditch effort to keep the GNoSR out of Elgin by proposing to the Morayshire board an amalgamation of their two companies. This obligated the Morayshire to put the proposal to the shareholders at a meeting on 31 October—the board, and with the history of dealings with the I&AJR, persuaded the shareholders that independence from them was the best way forward.

The GNoSR agreed to take over the running of the network as soon as the Morayshire constructed a viaduct across the Spey connecting with the GNoSR's Dufftown line. The direct link between Elgin and Rothes opened to passengers on 1 January 1862 (freight traffic had opened a day earlier) while the viaduct over the River Spey—constructed for £12,199 1s 4d—was completed on 1 June 1863, joining the GNoSR-controlled track at Craigellachie on 1 July. The original station was now renamed Dandaleith and the new one assumed the Craigellachie name. In 1866, the GNoSR took over the track and, without consultation with the Morayshire, closed the Rothes to Orton line to passenger traffic—much to the Morayshire's annoyance. By a series of small Speyside railways, nominally independent but controlled by the GNoSR, it joined track with the Morayshire Railway at Craigellachie and finally got its independent route to Elgin. On 30 July 1866, the GNoSR was granted consent to consolidate its series of small Speyside companies and to take the Morayshire Railway under its full ownership when terms and the debt issues had been resolved.

== Amalgamation ==
Relations between the Morayshire and GNoSR had soured in 1865 when the larger company wanted to take over its smaller partner under very unfavourable terms as a way of recovering the money it was owed—the debt carried by the Morayshire had become intolerable. On 14 August 1865, the City of Glasgow Bank refused further loans on top of the £38,172 16s 9d already owed. (Note: £38172 in 1865 was worth about £4,701,000 in 2024) Loans to various lenders included £15,211 (Note: £15,211 in 1865 was worth about £1,854,000 in 2024) to the Commercial Bank and £12,620 (Note: £12620 in 1865 was worth about £1,538,000 in 2024) to the GNoSR. Despite great efforts, no solution to paying off the debt could be found. The relationship between the GNoSR and the Morayshire continued to worsen.

May 23.—Mr. James Grant, late Provost of the burgh, died this day. He had been for more than a year in a very unsatisfactory state of health, and it was evident that his powerful frame was gradually breaking up. He had now reached his seventy-first year, having been born at Shenval, Strathavon, on 25th July 1801...

...He was the sole projector of the Morayshire Railway, to which he devoted his whole energies and attention, sometimes contending with difficulties and opposition under which any ordinary person would have succumbed. If this undertaking has not hitherto been remunerative to its shareholders, there is hope that, by the development of the resources of the country, it may in time become so.

— Elgin Town Council minutes, 23 May 1872

Great North of Scotland Railway Act 1881
- Act of Parliament
- Parliament of the United Kingdom
- Long title: An Act to confirm the transfer of the Morayshire Railway to the Great North of Scotland Railway Company; and for other purposes.
- Citation: 44 & 45 Vict. c. cci

Dates
- Royal assent: 11 August 1881

Text of statute as originally enacted

In late 1867, James Grant, the Morayshire chairman, made tentative enquiries with the Highland Railway (successor company to I&AJR) regarding an amalgamation of their two companies, and in early 1868, a statement regarding the terms of a possible amalgamation was produced. The GNoSR, when made aware of the statement, immediately set about safeguarding its investment in the Morayshire with negotiations between the two big companies eventually leading to the Highland withdrawing the amalgamation terms. After a short illness, the Morayshire chairman James Grant died on 23 May 1872, aged 70. His public funeral took place on 28 May, during which all shops and businesses in Elgin were closed. Gradually over the next few years, thanks mainly to the General Manager, Alexander Watt, the Morayshire introduced cost-cutting measures and revenue-raising schemes. Rail travel for both goods and passengers increased greatly. The herring fishing at Lossiemouth, coupled with attractions such as the public swimming baths at the port attracted visitors in large numbers, allowing the Morayshire to pay back outstanding debts to most of its creditors. The GNoSR acknowledged that the Morayshire was now on a sound footing and so in 1880 negotiations between the companies resumed and the enabling act for the amalgamation, the Great North of Scotland Railway Act 1881 (44 & 45 Vict. c. cci), was given royal assent on 11 August 1881. This ended the Morayshire Railway's 35-year existence.

== Subsequent history ==
The line from Elgin to Craigellachie was closed to all traffic in 1968. The section from Elgin to Lossiemouth was closed to passengers in 1964 and to freight in 1966 . Most of the Lossiemouth line has been converted to a public footpath. Lossiemouth station is now a leisure area, and the platforms are still in existence.

== Relative values of costs ==
For all of these calculations, see Sources, Officer & Williamson

== Sources ==
- Awdry, Christopher (1990). Encyclopaedia of British Railway Companies. Sparkford: Patrick Stephens Ltd. ISBN 1-8526-0049-7. OCLC 19514063. CN 8983.
- Barclay-Harvey, Malcolm, History of the Great North of Scotland Railway
- Bartlam, W.A. (2005), Moray's Railways – from 1852–c. 1964, paper deposited at Moray Libraries, the Moray Society and Royal Commission on the Ancient and Historical Monuments of Scotland in Edinburgh.
- Jowett, Alan (March 1989). Jowett's Railway Atlas of Great Britain and Ireland: From Pre-Grouping to the Present Day (1st ed.). Sparkford: Patrick Stephens Ltd. ISBN 978-1-85260-086-0. OCLC 22311137.
- Levi, Leone, ed. (1859), Annals of British Legislation, vol. V, Smith, Elder & Co
- Kneeland, Samuel, ed. (1867), Annual of Scientific Discovery for 1866 and 1867, Gould and Lincoln, Boston
- Mills, W. H. (1866). "The Craigellachie Viaduct (Including Plates)". Minutes of the Proceedings. 25 (1866): 229–236. doi:10.1680/imotp.1866.23188.
- Officer, Lawrence H.; Williamson, Samuel H (2014). "Six Ways to Compute the Relative Value of a U.K. Pound Amount, 1270 to present".
- Ross, John (2001), The Travellers Joy, GNoSR Association, ISBN 0-902343-11-4
- Thomas, John (1976). Forgotten Railways: Scotland (1st ed.). Newton Abbot: Devon: David & Charles. ISBN 0-7153-7185-1. OCLC 3103506.
- Thomas, John (1981). Forgotten Railways: Scotland (2nd ed.). Newton Abbot: Devon: David & Charles. ISBN 0-7153-8193-8. OCLC 13641185.
- Vallance, H. A.; Great North of Scotland Railway Association (1989) [1965]. The Great North of Scotland Railway. Vol. 3 (Revised ed.). Newton Abbot, Devon: David & Charles. ISBN 0-9465-3742-9. OCLC 26723281.
- Young, Robert (1879), Annals of the Parish and Burgh of Elgin, James Watson, "Moray Weekly News" Office
