= Park railway station (Deeside) =

Former railway station in Scotland

Park (Deeside)
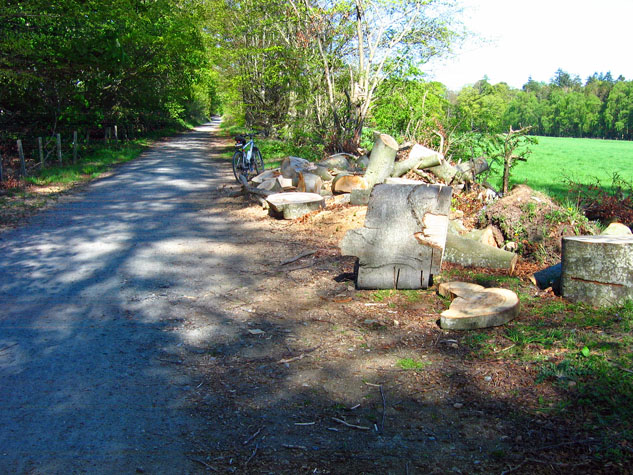
- The Deeside Way near Park House

General information
- Location: Park Estate, Aberdeenshire; Scotland
- Coordinates: 57.0794°N 2.3437°W
- Grid reference: NO 7926 9876
- Platforms: 2

Other information
- Status: Disused

History
- Original company: Deeside Railway
- Pre-grouping: Great North of Scotland Railway
- Post-grouping: LNER

Key dates
- 8 September 1853: Station opened
- 28 February 1966: Station closed to passengers
- 2 January 1967: Line closed to freight
Location

Park railway station was opened in September 1853 by the Deeside Railway and served the rural area around the Park estate, Nether Sunnyside, West Redford and the hamlet of Park. The Deeside Railway was taken over by the GNoSR and in 1894 nearby Culter became the terminus for the majority of Aberdeen suburban services with only a few trains continuing through Park to Banchory. Despite the 1937 closure of many other stations on the Aberdeen suburban service, Park remained open until 1966 as an intermediate station on the Deeside Railway that ran from Aberdeen (Joint) to Ballater. Park station was located in Drumoak Parish, Aberdeenshire, Scotland.

== Infrastructure ==
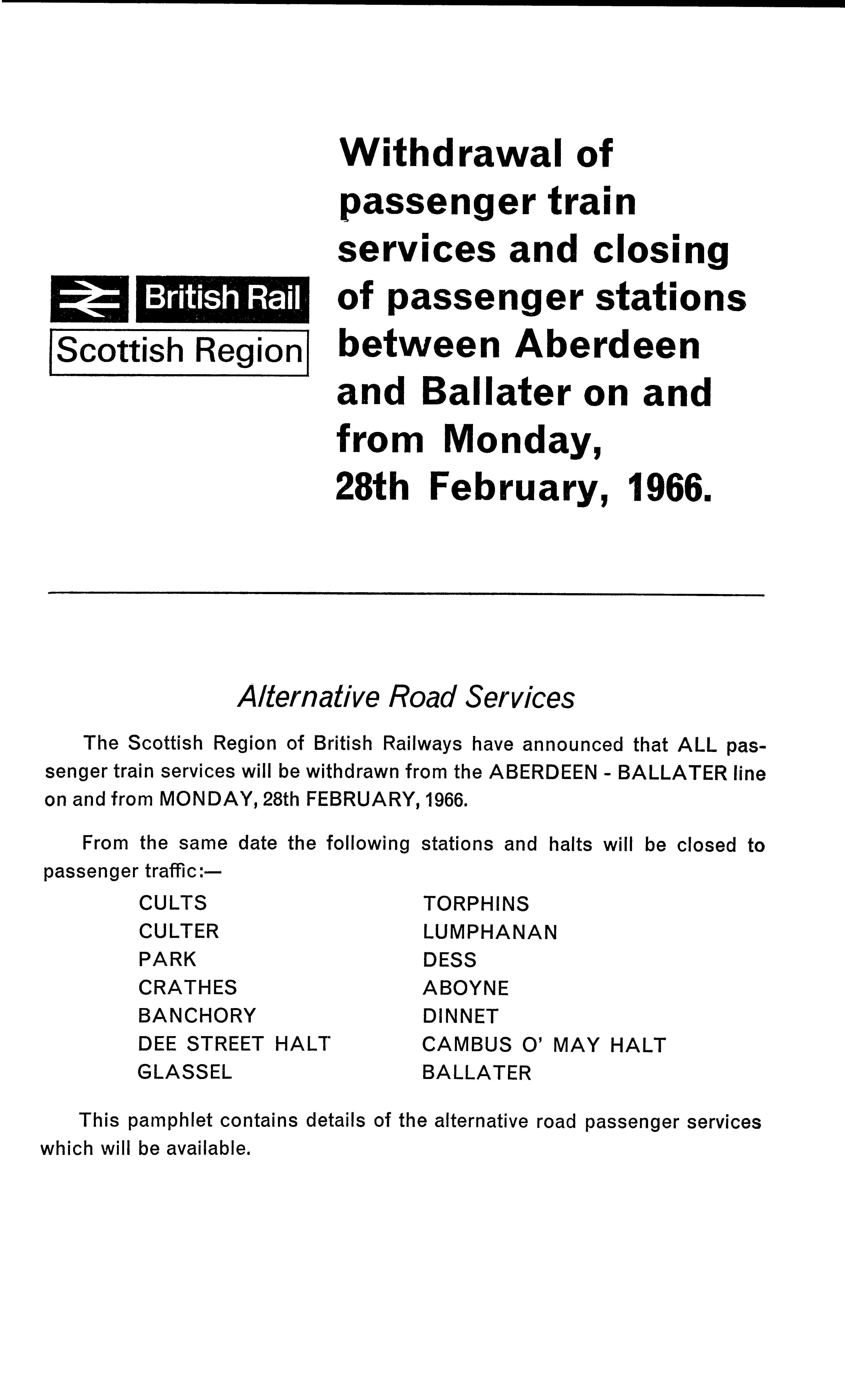
The 1966 BRB Closure notice.

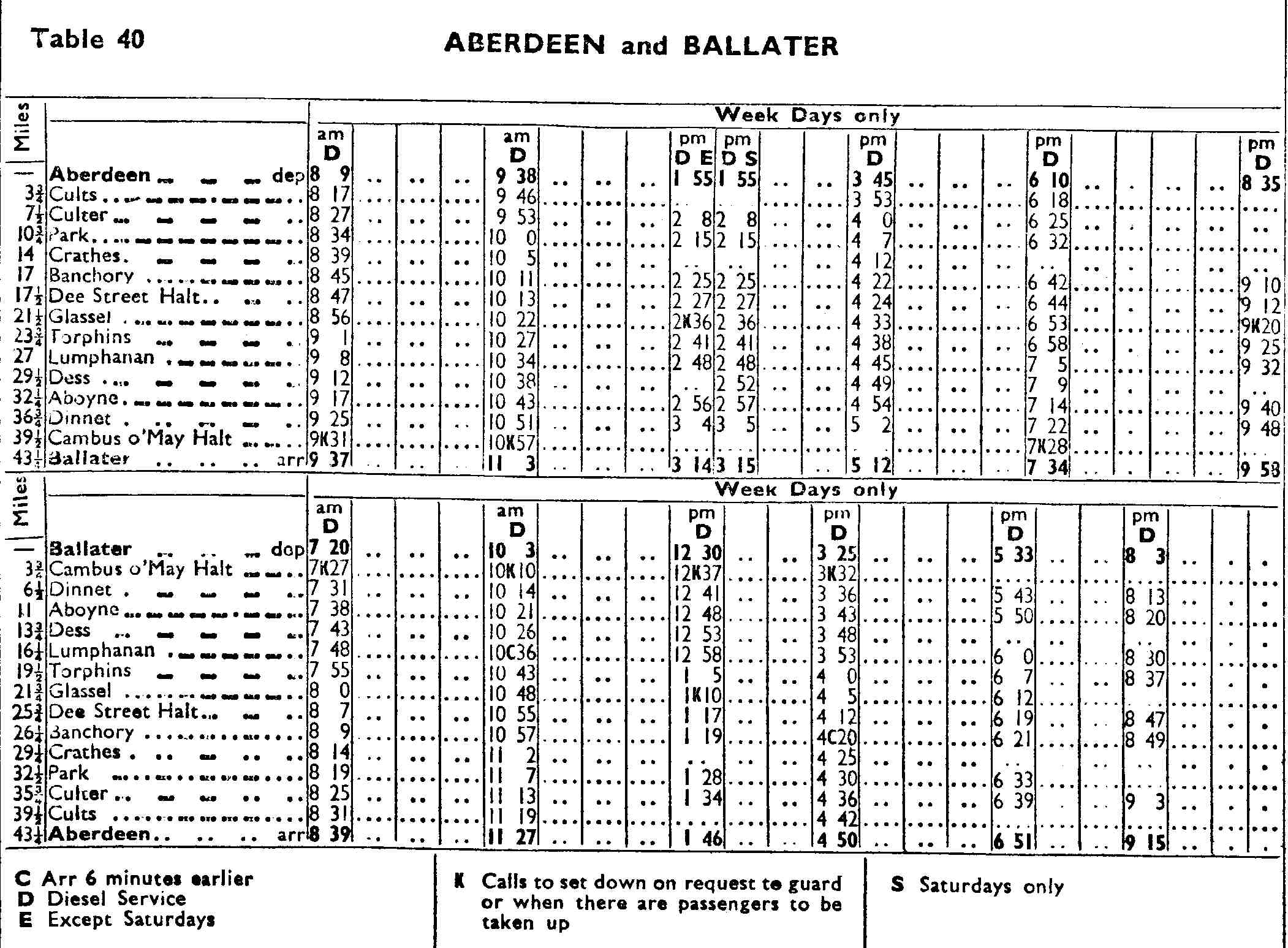
The 1963 timetable.

The 1853 station only had a short single platform on the later eastbound or northern side of the line with a basic station building. The later wooden station building with ticket office, staff accommodation, waiting area and toilets was of a typical GNoSR design as found at Milltimber, Torphins, Lumphanan and elsewhere on the line.

Doubling of the track to Park was in place by 1899 with various alterations made to the station in 1894 when the passing loop was added, such as a stationmaster's house, a second station building on the northern side, a pedestrian overbridge, a second platform and shelter with a signalbox on the southern side of the line just beyond the eastern end of the platform. A single siding ran into a second goods yard on the eastbound side of the station, accessed from the east. The 1899 OS map shows the double track to the west laid but not connected on the westbound side.

The GNoSR built Park Bridge across the River Dee for the convenience of people wishing to cross and to use the station. A stone built toll cottage was constructed which still stands as a private dwelling.

By 1966 the main line had been singled to the west, a signal box is shown at a different location, just to the west of the overbridge on the westbound or southern side, with the previous signalbox removed. A building had been shown here previously. The stationmaster's house is shown on the eastbound side. Only the eastbound platform was in use by this time. The goods yards track had been lifted and the shelter removed from the westbound long disused platform.

== Services ==
Suburban services, "subbies", began between Aberdeen and nearby Culter in 1894, calling at all eight intermediate stations in a seven-mile stretch of line in around 20 minutes with a total of around 30 trains every day. The "subbies" service was withdrawn from 5 April 1937 due to competition from bus services. The Aberdeen suburban railway stations were Holburn Street, Ruthrieston, Pitfodels, Cults, West Cults, Murtle, Milltimber and Culter.

The line was however chosen to trial the battery multiple unit and once introduced on 21 April 1958 the train service was doubled to six trains a day and in addition a Sunday service was reinstated.

== The site today ==
The main station building survives as an office for a local business. The Deeside long-distance path does not run through station site. The Royal Deeside Railway is located at Milton of Crathes down the line towards Ballater.

== Sources ==
- Butt, R. V. J. (October 1995). The Directory of Railway Stations: details every public and private passenger station, halt, platform and stopping place, past and present (1st ed.). Sparkford: Patrick Stephens Ltd. ISBN 978-1-85260-508-7. OCLC 60251199. OL 11956311M.
- Maxtone, Graham and Cooper, Mike (2018). Then and Now on the Great North. V.1. GNoSR Association. ISBN 978-0902343-30-6.

Preceding station	Historical railways	Following station
Drum; Line and station closed	Great North of Scotland Railway; Deeside Railway	Mills of Drum; Line and station closed
