= Drum railway station =

Railway station in Aberdeenshire, Scotland

Drum

General information
- Location: Drum Castle, Aberdeenshire; Scotland
- Coordinates: 57.0868°N 2.3200°W
- Grid reference: NO807995
- Platforms: 2

Other information
- Status: Disused

History
- Original company: Deeside Railway
- Pre-grouping: Great North of Scotland Railway
- Post-grouping: LNER

Key dates
- January 1854: Station opened
- 10 September 1951: Station closed to passengers
- 1966: Line closed to passengers
Location

Drum railway station was opened in January 1854 by the Deeside Railway and served the rural area around Drum Castle estate. The Deeside Railway was taken over by the GNoSR and in 1894 nearby Culter became the terminus for the majority of Aberdeen suburban services with only a few trains continuing through Drum to Banchory. Despite the 1937 closure of many other stations on the Aberdeen suburban service, Drum remained open until 1951 as an intermediate station on the Deeside Railway that ran from Aberdeen (Joint) to Ballater. Drum station was located in Drumoak Parish, Aberdeenshire, Scotland.

== History ==
The first single platformed station was opened in 1854 and stood on the northern side of the line with a level crossing to the west. Doubling of the track took place by 1899 with various alterations made to the station.

The Deeside branch at first was operated by the Deeside Railway. The line became part of the GNoSR and at grouping merged with the London and North Eastern Railway. The line was closed to passengers on 28 February 1966. The line has been lifted and extensive sections form part of the Deeside Way long-distance footpath.

== Infrastructure ==
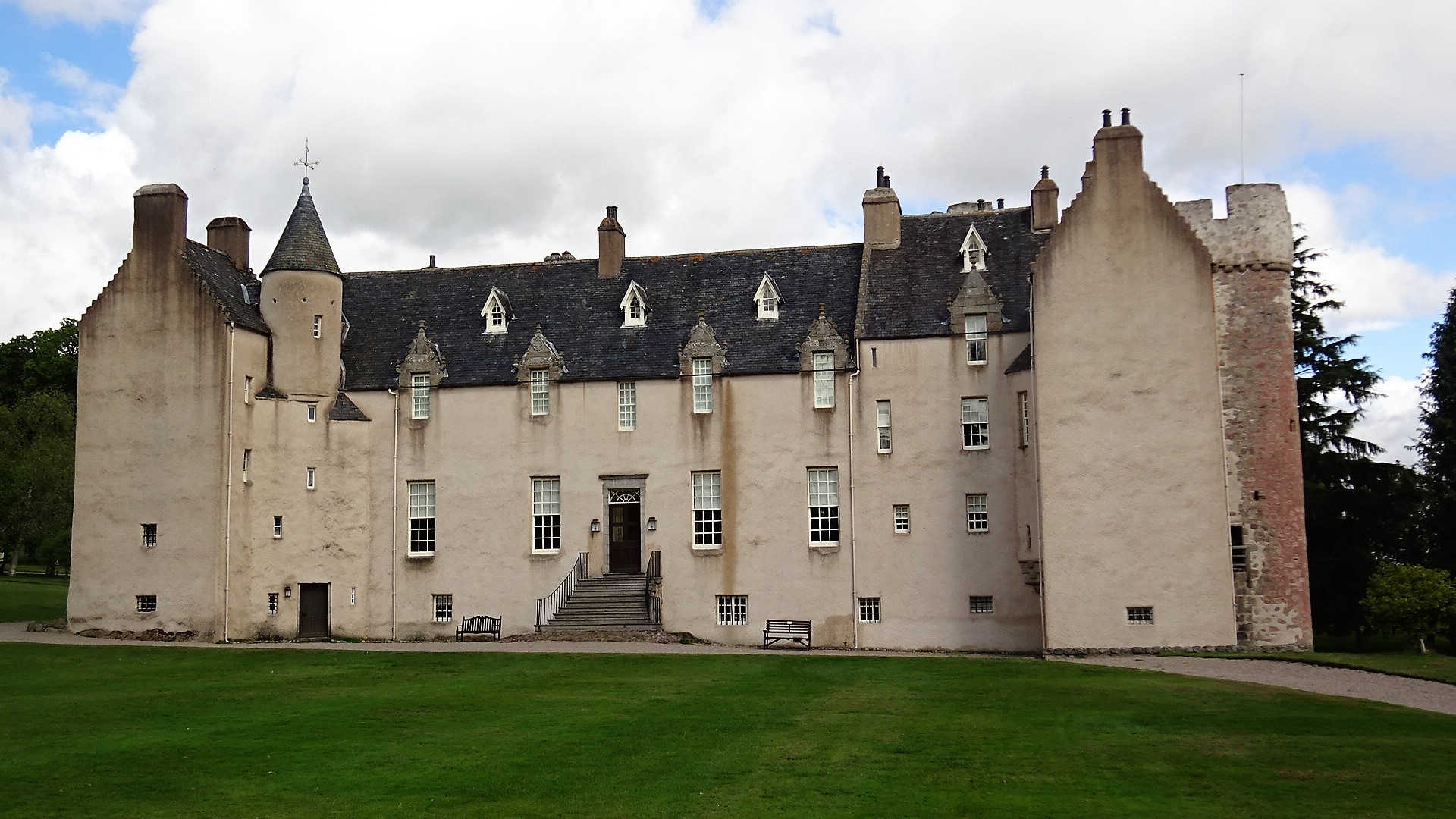
Drum Castle

The 1854 station only had a short single platform on the later eastbound or northern side of the line with a basic station building. The later wooden station building with ticket office, staff accommodation, waiting area and toilets was of a typical GNoSR design as found at Milltimber, Torphins, Lumphanan and elsewhere on the line.

Track doubling by 1899 resulted in a second platform with a small wooden shelter, a pedestrian overbridge and a small signalbox on the eastbound platform at the eastern end. The level crossing was replaced with a road overbridge at this time. A goods yard was built to the west on the eastbound side of the line, consisting of several sidings, a loading dock and a short siding running to the east.

By 1964 the main line had been singled with the westbound track lifted, the pedestrian bridge removed, but the stationmaster's house is still shown. Only the eastbound platform was in use by this time. The goods yard track had been lifted.

== Services ==
Suburban services, "subbies", began between Aberdeen and nearby Culter in 1894, calling at all eight intermediate stations in a seven-mile stretch of line in around 20 minutes with a total of around 30 trains every day. The "subbies" service was withdrawn from 5 April 1937 due to competition from bus services. The Aberdeen suburban railway stations were Holburn Street, Ruthrieston, Pitfodels, Cults, West Cults, Murtle, Milltimber and Culter.

The line was however chosen to trial the battery multiple unit and once introduced on 21 April 1958 the train service was doubled to six trains a day and in addition a Sunday service was reinstated.

== The site today ==
The station buildings have been demolished but one platform remains with the old westbound shelter in use as a summer house. The Deeside long-distance path does not run through station site. The Royal Deeside Railway is located at Milton of Crathes down the line towards Ballater.

== Sources ==
- Butt, R. V. J. (October 1995). The Directory of Railway Stations: details every public and private passenger station, halt, platform and stopping place, past and present (1st ed.). Sparkford: Patrick Stephens Ltd. ISBN 978-1-85260-508-7. OCLC 60251199. OL 11956311M.
- Maxtone, Graham and Cooper, Mike (2018). Then and Now on the Great North. V.1. GNoSR Association. ISBN 978-0902343-30-6.

Preceding station	Historical railways	Following station
Culter; Line and station closed	Great North of Scotland Railway; Deeside Railway	Park railway station (Deeside); Line and station closed
