= Culter railway station =

Disused railway station in Scotland

Culter
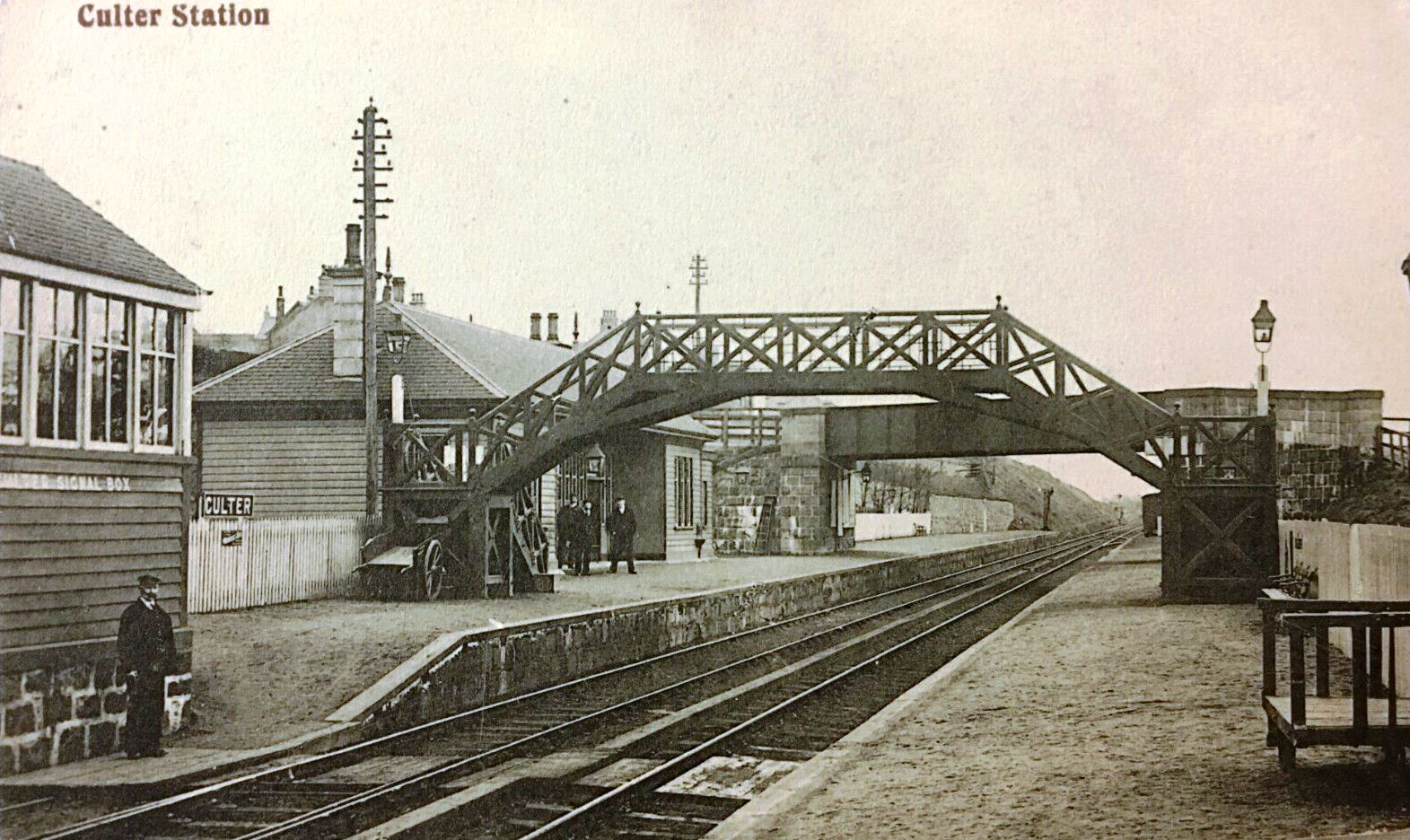

General information
- Location: Culter, Aberdeenshire; Scotland
- Coordinates: 57.0951°N 2.2634°W
- Grid reference: NJ841004
- Platforms: 2

Other information
- Status: Disused

History
- Original company: Deeside Railway
- Pre-grouping: Great North of Scotland Railway
- Post-grouping: LNER

Key dates
- 8 September 1853: Station opened
- 28 February 1966: Station closed to passengers
- 2 January 1967: Line closed to freight
Location

Culter railway station was opened on 8 September 1853 by the Deeside Railway and served the town of Peterculter, locally known as Culter. After the line was taken over by the Great North of Scotland Railway, Culter became the terminus of the Aberdeen suburban service in 1894, although some trains continued to Banchory. Despite the closure of many other suburban stations in 1937, Culter remained open until 1966 as an intermediate station on the line between Aberdeen (Joint) and Ballater. The station was located in the parish of Peterculter, Aberdeenshire, Scotland.

== History ==
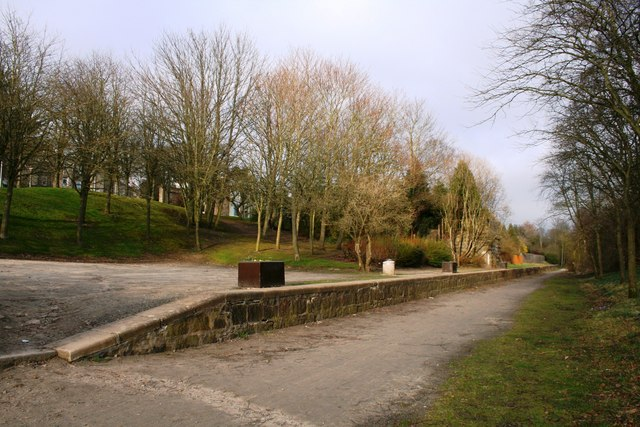
The Culter station site in 2009

The first station at Culter, which had a single platform, opened in 1853 and stood to the west of the replacement station provided when the line was doubled in 1892. The goods yard lay to the east, approached from that direction, and remained in use after the new station was opened close to the ruins of St Peter's Chapel. A short branch served the Culter Paper Mill, around which the town subsequently developed. The line west towards Park from the new station site was not doubled until 1899.

The Deeside branch was initially operated by the Deeside Railway. The line later became part of the GNoSR and, at the 1923 railway grouping, was absorbed into the London and North Eastern Railway. Culter station lay 7.5 miles (12 km) from Aberdeen Joint and 43.25 miles (69.5 km) from Ballater. It was closed to passengers on 28 February 1966. The line has since been lifted, with sections forming part of the Deeside Way long-distance footpath.

== Infrastructure ==
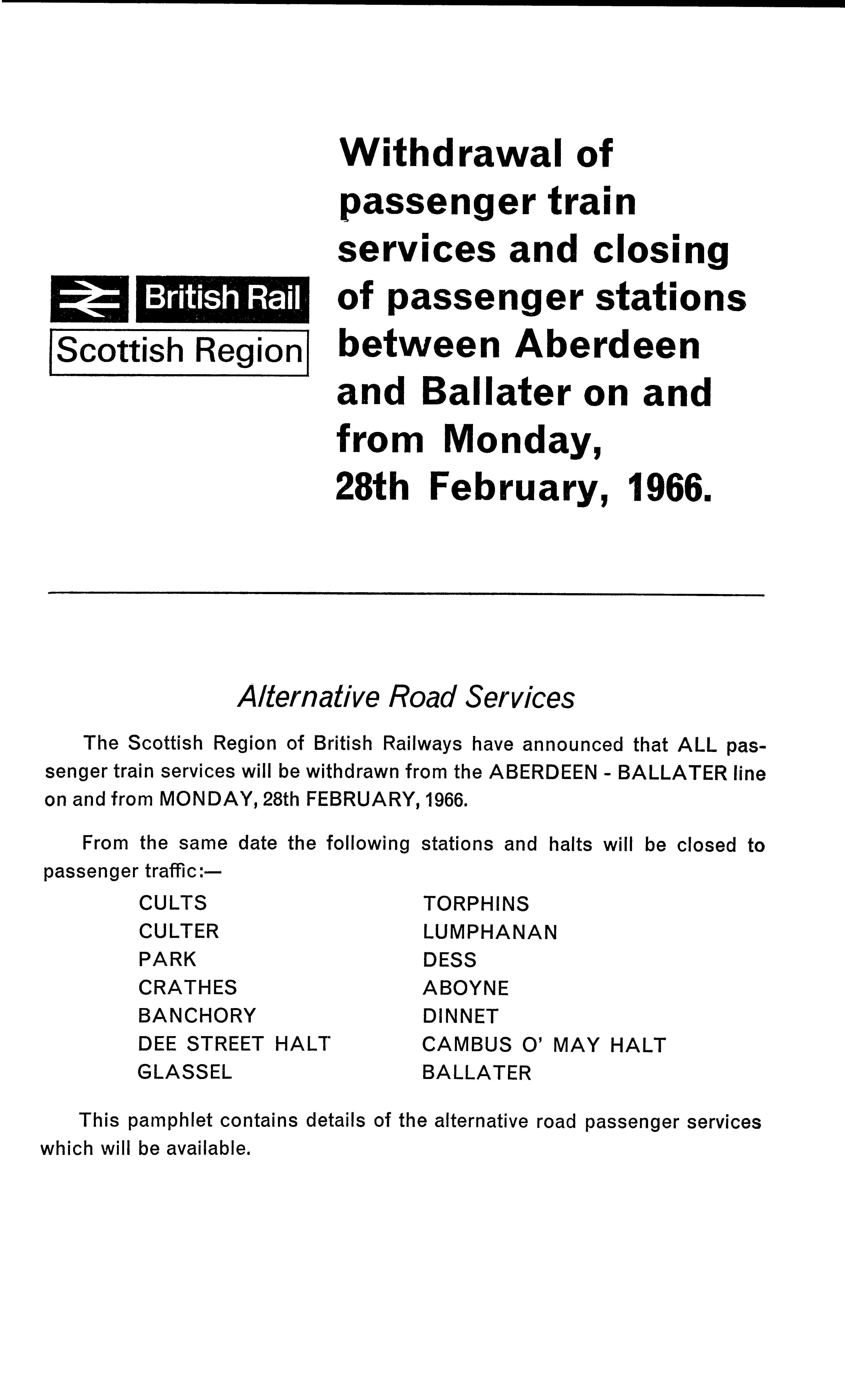
The 1966 BRB Closure notice.

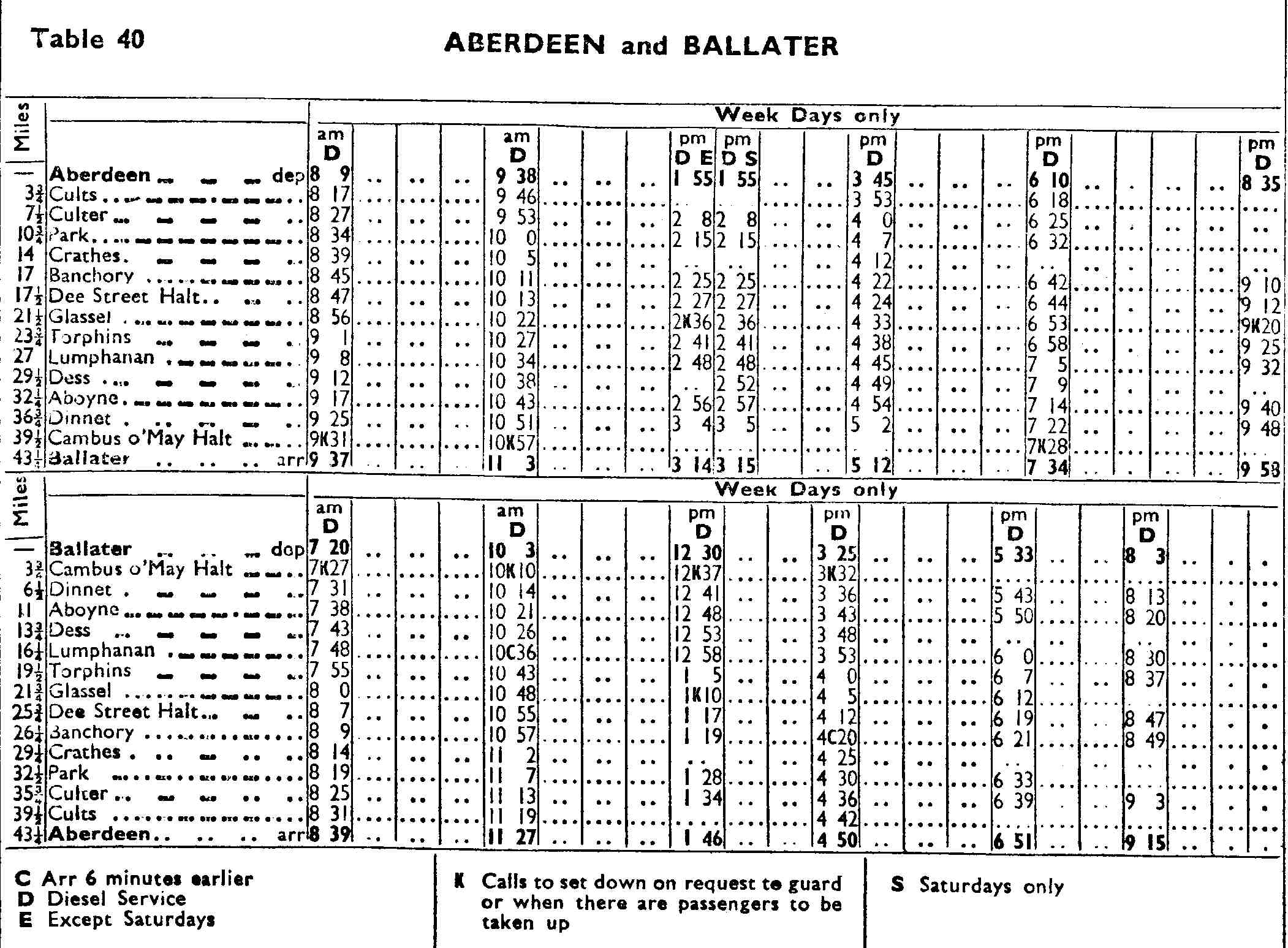
The 1963 timetable.

The 1853 station only had a short single platform on the later eastbound or northern side. By 1892 the line had been doubled and a goods yard built on the eastern side with two sidings, approached from the east. A complex and extensive network of lines lay within the paper works buildings. The goods yard had several sidings, a crane and weighing machine. The line west towards Park from the new station site was not completely doubled until after 1899.

A pedestrian footbridge was present, a signal box on the western end of the eastbound platform, typical GNoSR wooden station buildings and a shelter on the westbound platform together with a water tank tower. Crossover points lay towards the east end of the platforms and a single siding lay parallel to the line on the southern side.

By 1963 the main line had been singled with the westbound track lifted, the pedestrian bridge removed, but the signal box retained. Only the eastbound platform was in use by this time. The goods yard was still present as was the double track section through the station and the paper works lines. The freight line that led to Culter Paper Mills remained in use until 2 January 1967.

== Services ==
Suburban services, known as “subbies”, began between Aberdeen and Culter in 1894, calling at all eight intermediate stations over a seven-mile stretch of line in around 20 minutes, with approximately 30 trains operating each day. In 1914, Culter was served by thirty-five eastbound and thirty-six westbound trains within a seventeen-hour working day. The suburban service was withdrawn on 5 April 1937 due to competition from bus services. The Aberdeen suburban railway stations were Holburn Street, Ruthrieston, Pitfodels, Cults, West Cults, Murtle, Milltimber and Culter.

The line was chosen to trial the battery multiple unit and once introduced on 21 April 1958 the train service was doubled to six trains a day and in addition a Sunday service was reinstated.

== The site today ==
The station buildings have been demolished, but one platform remains in good condition, along with bridge abutments, and the former trackbed is now used as part of the Deeside Way. The Royal Deeside Railway is located at Milton of Crathes some distance down the line towards Ballater.

== Sources ==
- Butt, R. V. J. (October 1995). The Directory of Railway Stations: details every public and private passenger station, halt, platform and stopping place, past and present (1st ed.). Sparkford: Patrick Stephens Ltd. ISBN 978-1-85260-508-7. OCLC 60251199. OL 11956311M.
- Maxtone, Graham and Cooper, Mike (2018). Then and Now on the Great North. V.1. GNoSR Association. ISBN 978-0902343-30-6.

Preceding station	Historical railways	Following station
Milltimber; Line and station closed	Great North of Scotland Railway; Deeside Railway	Drum; Line and station closed
