= Holburn Street railway station =

Disused railway station in Aberdeen, Scotland

Holburn Street
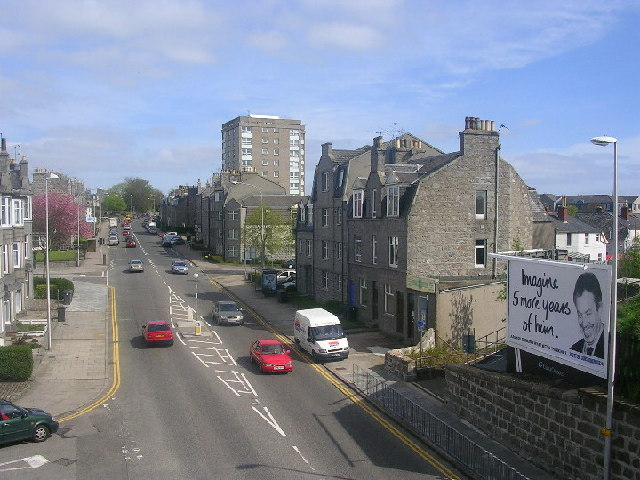
- Holburn Street from the site of the old station

General information
- Location: Aberdeen, Aberdeenshire; Scotland
- Coordinates: 57.1309°N 2.1159°W
- Grid reference: NJ930044
- Platforms: 2

Other information
- Status: Disused

History
- Original company: Great North of Scotland Railway
- Pre-grouping: Great North of Scotland Railway
- Post-grouping: LNER

Key dates
- 2 July 1894: Station opened
- 5 April 1937: Closed
- 28 February 1966: Line closed to passengers
- 02 January 1967: Line closed to freight
Location

Holburn Street railway station was a railway station in Aberdeen, Scotland. It was opened in July 1894 by the GNSR and served a suburb of Aberdeen near Duthie Park and Allenvale Cemetery. The station was one of several victims of the 1937 closure of stations on the Aberdeen suburban service. The Deeside Railway itself eventually ran from Aberdeen (Joint) to Ballater.

== History ==
The station was opened on 2 July 1894 and was part of a new Aberdeen suburban service on a section of the Deeside branch. At first the branch services had been operated by the Deeside Railway. The line became part of the GNSR who opened Holburn Street and at grouping the company merged with the London and North Eastern Railway.

Holburn Street was closed to passengers on 5 April 1937 as a part of the withdrawal of the Aberdeen suburban service that had been the victim of increasing competition from bus services. After its closure in 1937 the line itself remained open to Ballater until 1966. Ruthrieston and Aberdeen Joint stations were only a relatively short distance away. The line has been lifted and this section forms part of the Deeside Way long-distance footpath.

In 1906 the Royal Train called here and King Edward VII disembarked to join the procession leading to Marischal College for the opening ceremony. King George V also used the station to open Cowdray Hall in 1925 having travelled by a special train from Ballater.

== Infrastructure ==
The 1900 OS map shows a built up suburban area with a double track line with no crossover points. The station consisted of two platforms on an embankment site with a main station building and substantial canopy on the northern or eastbound side of the line and a shelter on the southern side with the two connected by a pedestrian bridge. Signals were present but no signalbox is indicated. By 1953 the line was singled with the westbound or southern track lifted. The station buildings had been demolished apart from the stationmaster's house on the southern side of the station below the embankment. No goods sidings or yard were built here.

== Services ==
In 1928 the suburban railway service, with stations at Holburn Street, Ruthrieston, Pitfodels, Cults, West Cults, Murtle, Milltimber and Culter, locally called the 'subbies' started additionally operating Sunday, services however due to competition with the buses it was announced on 28 January 1937 that the service would cease altogether in April 1937, Sunday services having ceased in 1936. It had once been very popular, the journey taking around twenty minutes to go the seven or so miles. The 1894 service of eight trains had doubled in 1900. Suburban stations were only able to issue passengers tickets to stations served by the suburban train service.

== The site today ==
The old platforms remain with the trackbed in use as part of the Deeside Way and the old railway bridge replaced. The Royal Deeside Railway is located at Milton of Crathes some distance down the line towards Ballater.

== Sources ==
- Butt, R. V. J. (October 1995). The Directory of Railway Stations: details every public and private passenger station, halt, platform and stopping place, past and present (1st ed.). Sparkford: Patrick Stephens Ltd. ISBN 978-1-85260-508-7. OCLC 60251199. OL 11956311M.
- Maxtone, Graham and Cooper, Mike (2018). Then and Now on the Great North. V.1. GNoSR Association. ISBN 978-0902343-30-6.

| Preceding station | Historical railways | Following station |
|---|---|---|
| Aberdeen Joint; Line partly open, station open (as Aberdeen) | Great North of Scotland Railway; Deeside Railway | Ruthrieston; Line and station closed |
