= Ruthrieston railway station =

Former railway station in Scotland

Ruthrieston
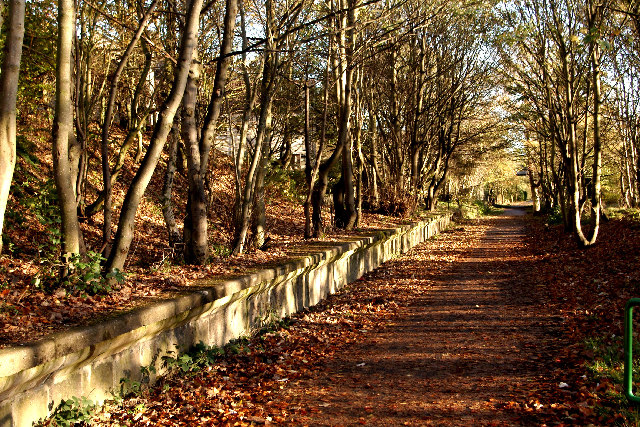
- Ruthrieston station site in 2005.

General information
- Location: Aberdeen, Aberdeenshire; Scotland
- Coordinates: 57.1281°N 2.1260°W
- Grid reference: NJ924041
- Platforms: 2

Other information
- Status: Disused

History
- Original company: Great North of Scotland Railway
- Pre-grouping: Great North of Scotland Railway
- Post-grouping: LNER

Key dates
- January 1856: Station opened
- April 1876: Closed
- 1 June 1885: Reopened
- June 1927: Renamed Ruthrieston Halt
- 5 April 1937: Closed
- 2 January 1967: Line closed to freight
Location

Ruthrieston railway station or Ruthrieston Halt was opened in January 1856 by the GNSR and served Ruthrieston, now a suburb of Aberdeen. The halt was one of several victims of the 1937 closure of stations on the Aberdeen suburban service. The Deeside Railway itself eventually ran from Aberdeen (Joint) to Ballater. Ruthrieston is located in the parish of Peterculter, Aberdeenshire, Scotland.

== History ==
The station was first opened in January 1856 and closed in April 1876. It was reopened in June 1885 and was part of a new Aberdeen suburban service on a section of the Deeside branch. At first the branch services had been operated by the Deeside Railway. The line had become part of the GNoSR who opened Ruthrieston on both occasions and at grouping the company merged with the London and North Eastern Railway.

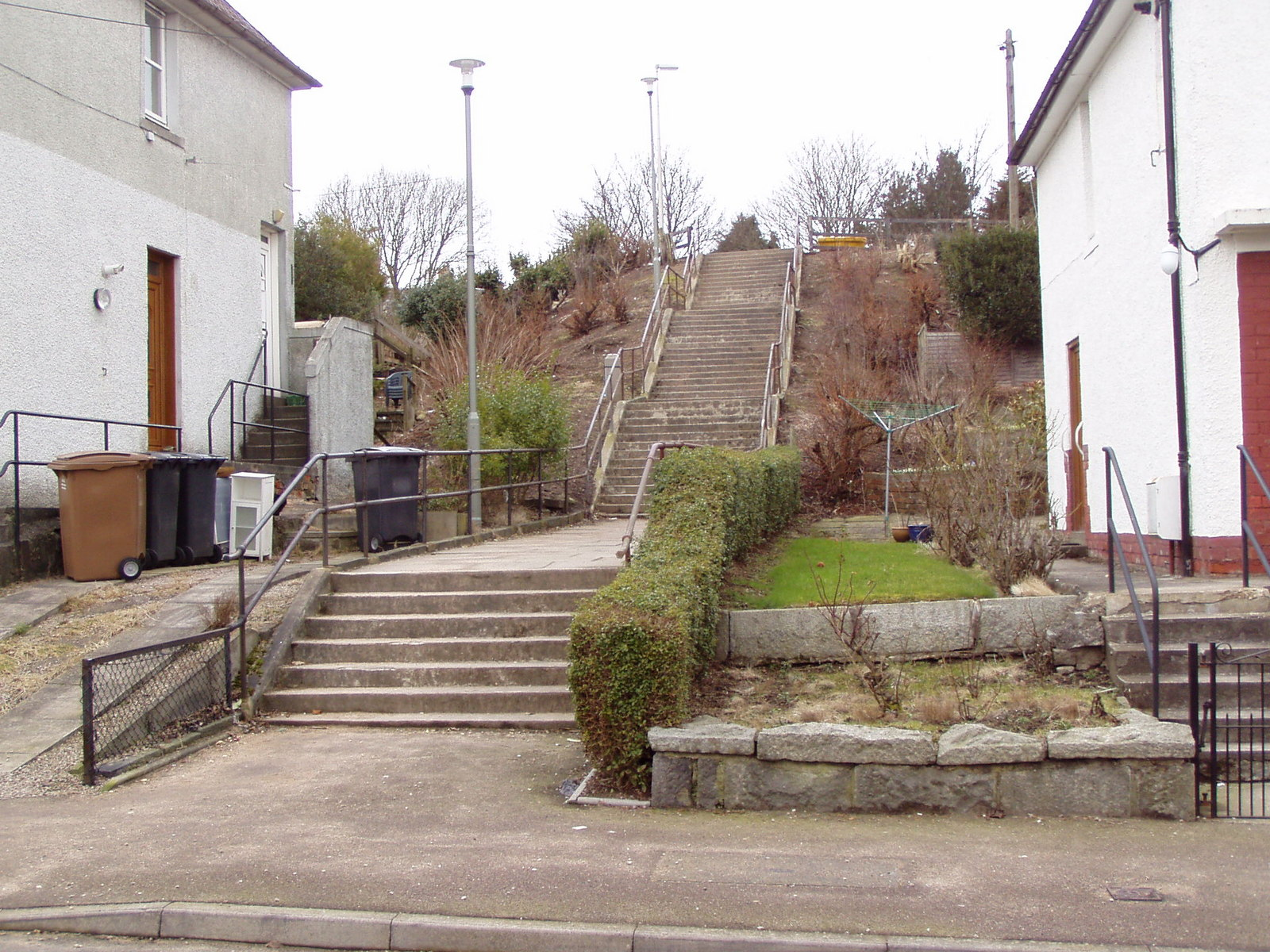
Steps to the station overbridge.

Ruthrieston became an unstaffed halt in June 1927 due to low passenger usage. and was closed to passengers on 5 April 1937 as a part of the withdrawal of the Aberdeen suburban service that had been the victim of increasing competition from bus services. After its closure in 1937 the line itself remained open to Ballater until 1966. Pitfodels and Holburn Street stations were only a short distance away. The line has been lifted and this sections forms part of the Deeside Way long-distance footpath.

== Infrastructure ==
The 1867 OS map shows a rural area with a single track line and the station on the north side of the line with a very short platform and a single building. By 1900 the track here had been doubled and the station consisted of two platforms with a stationmaster's house, a small station building on the northern side of the line and a simple wooden shelter on the southern side with the two connected by a pedestrian bridge. Signals were present but no signalbox is indicated. By 1953 the line was singled with the westbound or southern track lifted. The station buildings had been demolished apart from the stationmaster's house.

A line ran to the East Pitmuxton Siding from near the station, approached from the east.

== Services ==
In 1928 the suburban railway service, with stations at Holburn Street, Ruthrieston, Pitfodels, Cults, West Cults, Murtle, Milltimber and Culter, locally called the 'subbies' started additionally operating Sunday, services however due to competition with the buses it was announced on 28 January 1937 that the service would cease altogether in April 1937, Sunday services having ceased in 1936. It had once been very popular, the journey taking around twenty minutes to go the seven or so miles. The 1894 service of eight trains had doubled in 1900. Suburban stations were only able to issue passengers tickets to stations served by the suburban train service.

== The site today ==
The old platform on the north side of the trackbed remains with the trackbed in use as part of the Deeside Way. The Royal Deeside Railway is located at Milton of Crathes some distance down the line towards Ballater.

== Sources ==
- Butt, R. V. J. (October 1995). The Directory of Railway Stations: details every public and private passenger station, halt, platform and stopping place, past and present (1st ed.). Sparkford: Patrick Stephens Ltd. ISBN 978-1-85260-508-7. OCLC 60251199. OL 11956311M.
- Maxtone, Graham and Cooper, Mike (2018). Then and Now on the Great North. V.1. GNoSR Association. ISBN 978-0902343-30-6.

Preceding station	Historical railways	Following station
Holburn Street; Line and station closed	Great North of Scotland Railway; Deeside Railway	Pitfodels; Line and station closed
