= Bieldside railway station =

Disused railway station in Aberdeenshire, Scotland

Bieldside
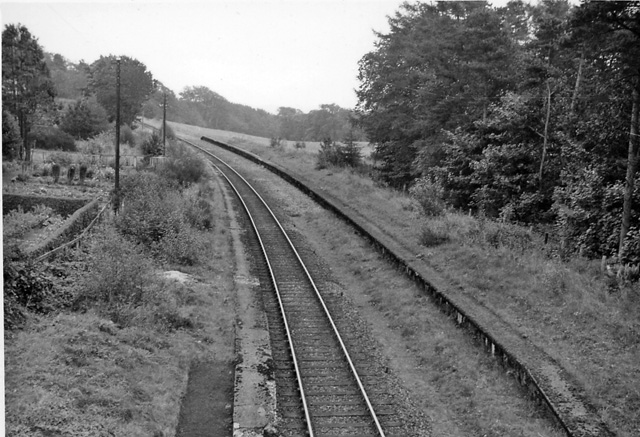
- The station site in 1961

General information
- Location: Aberdeen, Aberdeenshire; Scotland
- Coordinates: 57.1114°N 2.1963°W
- Grid reference: NJ882022
- Platforms: 2

Other information
- Status: Disused

History
- Original company: Great North of Scotland Railway
- Pre-grouping: Great North of Scotland Railway
- Post-grouping: LNER

Key dates
- 1 June 1897: Station opened
- 5 April 1937: Station closed to passengers
- 18 July 1966: Line closed entirely
Location

Bieldside railway station served the Bieldside area within the parish of Peterculter from 1897 to 1937 on the Deeside Railway that ran from Aberdeen (Joint) to Ballater. This area was the location of a number of mansion houses and estates such as Woodthorpe, Dalmunzie, The Firs, etc., some built as a result of the railway.

== History ==
The station was opened in June 1897 as part of the Aberdeen suburban service on the Deeside branch and at first branch services were operated by the Deeside Railway. Later the line became part of the GNoSR who opened Bieldside and at grouping merged with the London and North Eastern Railway. Bieldside is likely to have become an unstaffed halt circa 1930 and was closed to passengers on 5 April 1937 as a part of the withdrawal of the Aberdeen suburban service. The station probably became unstaffed at the same time as Murtle and Milltimber with the aforementioned closure of the Aberdeen suburban service. After its closure in 1937 the line itself remained open to Ballater until 1966. The line has been lifted and this section forms part of the Deeside Way long-distance footpath.

== Infrastructure ==
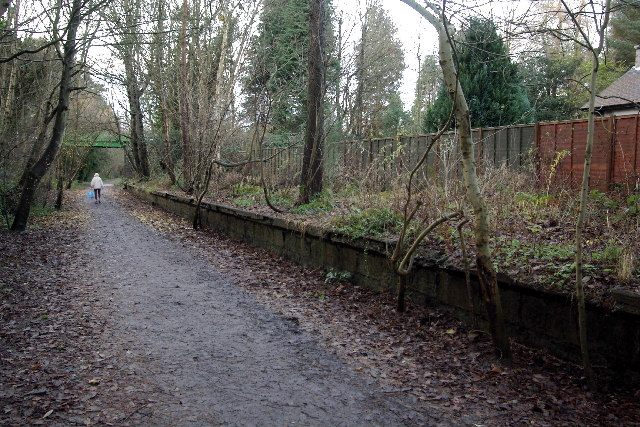
The old station and Deeside Way in 2005

The wooden station building with its 'hipped roof', had a waiting room, ticket office, staff accommodation and toilets, similar to those at Torphins, Lumphanan and elsewhere on the line. It did not possess a goods yard.

The decision to construct the station was made on 11 January 1893 and it opened in 1897 at a cost of £1363. The line was doubled in 1892, a stone stationmasters house built, together with a wooden pedestrian overbridge and a signal box with a small wooden shelter located on the westbound platform. No points were present on this curved section of track.

In 1963 the station, closed since 1937, was now on a single track section of line with the station house still standing however the old station building and signal box had been demolished by this date. The westbound side of the track was the first to be lifted.

== Services ==
In 1928 the suburban railway, locally called the 'subbies' started additionally operating Sunday services to Culter however due to competition with the buses it was announced on 28 January 1937 that the service would cease altogether in April 1937, Sunday services having ceased in 1936.

== The site today ==
Both platforms of Aberdeenshire granite remaining in situ however the station buildings apart from the stationmaster's have been demolished. The Royal Deeside Railway is located at Milton of Crathes some distance down the line towards Ballater.

== Sources ==
- Butt, R. V. J. (October 1995). The Directory of Railway Stations: details every public and private passenger station, halt, platform and stopping place, past and present (1st ed.). Sparkford: Patrick Stephens Ltd. ISBN 978-1-85260-508-7. OCLC 60251199. OL 11956311M.
- Maxtone, Graham and Cooper, Mike (2018). Then and Now on the Great North. V.1. GNoSR Association. ISBN 978-0902343-30-6.

Preceding station	Historical railways	Following station
West Cults; Line and station closed	Great North of Scotland Railway; Deeside Railway	Murtle; Line and station closed
