= Pitfodels railway station =

Former railway station in Scotland

Pitfodels
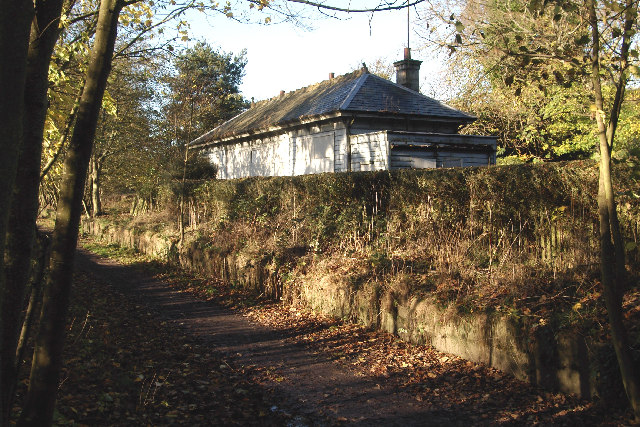
- Pitfodels station site in 2005

General information
- Location: Aberdeen, Aberdeenshire; Scotland
- Coordinates: 57.1205°N 2.1561°W
- Grid reference: NJ906033
- Platforms: 2

Other information
- Status: Disused

History
- Original company: Great North of Scotland Railway
- Pre-grouping: Great North of Scotland Railway
- Post-grouping: LNER

Key dates
- 2 July 1894: Station opened
- 1926: Renamed Pitfodels Halt
- 5 April 1937: Station closed to passengers
- 02 January 1967: Line closed to freight
Location

Pitfodels railway station or Pitfodels Halt was opened on 2 July 1894 by the GNoSR and served a suburb of Aberdeen with housing and estates such as Wellwood, Inchgarth and Norwood. The halt was one of several victims of the 1937 closure of stations on the Aberdeen suburban service. The Deeside Railway itself ran from Aberdeen (Joint) to Ballater. Pitfodels is located in the parish of Peterculter, Aberdeenshire, Scotland.

== History ==
The station was opened in August 1894 as part of a new Aberdeen suburban service on a section of the Deeside branch. At first the branch services had been operated by the Deeside Railway. The line became part of the GNoSR who opened Pitfodels and at grouping merged with the London and North Eastern Railway. Pitfodels became an unstaffed halt in 1926 due to low passenger usage. and was closed to passengers on 5 April 1937 as a part of the withdrawal of the Aberdeen suburban service that had been the victim of increasing competition from bus services. After its closure in 1937 the line itself remained open to Ballater until 1966. Cults and Ruthrieston stations were only a short distance away. The line has been lifted and this sections forms part of the Deeside Way long-distance footpath.

== Infrastructure ==
The typical 1894 GNoSR design wooden station with a 'hipped' roof had a booking office, general waiting hall, staff accommodation and toilets. The main building stood on the eastbound platform on a section of track doubled at the time of its opening. A simple wooden shelter stood on the westbound platform with a pedestrian overbridge connecting the two. No goods yard, sidings or crossover points were present. Signals are marked however no signalbox is indicated on OS maps. A road overbridge stood at the eastern end of the station. By 1951 the line had been singled with the westbound track lifted.

== Services ==
In 1928, the suburban railway service, with stations at Holburn Street, Ruthrieston, Pitfodels, Cults, West Cults, Murtle, Milltimber and Culter, locally called the 'subbies' started additionally operating Sunday, services however due to competition with the buses it was announced on 28 January 1937 that the service would cease altogether in April 1937, Sunday services having ceased in 1936. It had once been very popular, the journey taking around twenty minutes to go the seven or so miles. The 1894 service of eight trains had doubled in 1900. Suburban stations were only able to issue passengers tickets to stations served by the suburban train service.

== The site today ==
The enlarged and refurbished main station building survives, as does the stationmaster's cottage and both overgrown platforms remain with the trackbed in use as part of the Deeside Way. The Royal Deeside Railway is located at Milton of Crathes some distance down the line towards Ballater.

== Sources ==
- Butt, R. V. J. (October 1995). The Directory of Railway Stations: details every public and private passenger station, halt, platform and stopping place, past and present (1st ed.). Sparkford: Patrick Stephens Ltd. ISBN 978-1-85260-508-7. OCLC 60251199. OL 11956311M.
- Maxtone, Graham and Cooper, Mike (2018). Then and Now on the Great North. V.1. GNoSR Association. ISBN 978-0902343-30-6.

Preceding station	Historical railways	Following station
Ruthrieston; Line and station closed	Great North of Scotland Railway; Deeside Railway	Cults; Line and station closed
