= Mills of Drum railway station =

Former railway station in Scotland

Mills of Drum

General information
- Location: Crathes, Aberdeenshire; Scotland
- Coordinates: 57.0624°N 2.3960°W
- Grid reference: NO760968
- Platforms: 1

Other information
- Status: Disused

History
- Original company: Deeside Railway
- Pre-grouping: Great North of Scotland Railway

Key dates
- 8 September 1853: Station opened
- 1 January 1863: Station closed to passengers
- 1966: Line closed to passengers
Location

Mills of Drum railway station was opened in September 1853 by the Deeside Railway and served the rural area around Park House and Crathes estates at the Mills of Drum or Drum Mills, corn mills, that lay close to the River Dee. The Deeside Railway was taken over by the GNoSR in the 1860s. Mills of Drum only remained open until 1863 as an intermediate station on the Deeside Railway that ran from Aberdeen (Joint) to Ballater. Mills of Drum station was located in Deeside, Aberdeenshire, Scotland.

== History ==
The short single-platform station was opened in 1853 and stood on the single track line with a level crossing to the west and a toll gate on the nearby road. By 1903 the site had been renamed Mills of Crathes. The station name is recorded on the 1855 maps It stood 13 miles or 21 km from Aberdeen.

The Deeside branch at first was operated by the Deeside Railway. The line became itself became part of the GNoSR and at grouping merged with the London and North Eastern Railway. The line was closed to passengers on 28 February 1966. The line has been lifted and extensive sections form part of the Deeside Way long-distance footpath.

== Infrastructure ==
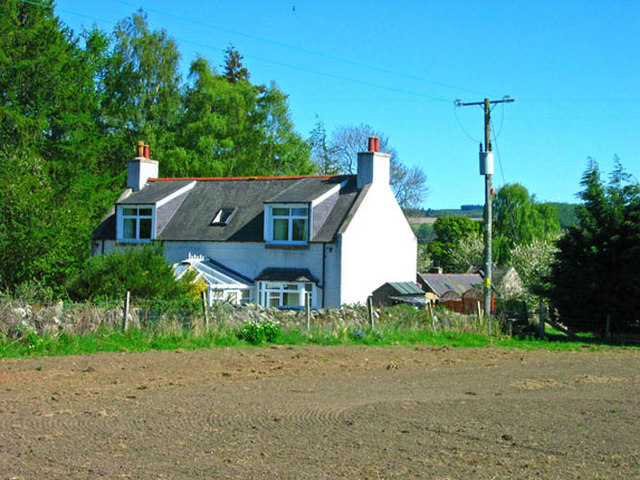
Mills of Drum

The station only had a short single platform on the single track line without any sidings or passing loop, etc.

== Services ==
The station was closed after a short life, however the line remained open for passenger services until 1966. Initially three trains a day ran, operated by the Aberdeen Railway, with only one locomotive available. The Deeside Railway purchased its own rolling stock which were in service by summer 1854.

== The site today ==
The station has been demolished and the track lifted. The Deeside long-distance path runs through the old station site. The Royal Deeside Railway is located at Milton of Crathes down the line towards Ballater.

== Sources ==
- Butt, R. V. J. (October 1995). The Directory of Railway Stations: details every public and private passenger station, halt, platform and stopping place, past and present (1st ed.). Sparkford: Patrick Stephens Ltd. ISBN 978-1-85260-508-7. OCLC 60251199. OL 11956311M.
- Vallance, H. A. (27 June 1991). Great North of Scotland railway. The History of the Railways of the Scottish Highlands Vol. 3. David St John Thomas. ISBN 978-0-946537-60-0.

Preceding station	Historical railways	Following station
Park railway station (Deeside); Line and station closed	Great North of Scotland Railway; Deeside Railway	Crathes; Line and station closed
