= List of listed buildings in Drumoak =

This is a list of listed buildings in the parish of Drumoak in Aberdeenshire, Scotland.

== List ==
Name	Location	Date Listed	Grid Ref. (Note: Sometimes known as OSGB36, the grid reference (where provided) is based on the British national grid reference system used by the Ordnance Survey. • "Guide to National Grid". Ordnance Survey. • "Get-a-map". Ordnance Survey.)	Geo-coordinates	Notes	LB Number (Note: Historic Environment Scotland assign a unique alphanumeric identifier to each designated site in Scotland, for listed buildings this always begins with "LB", for example "LB12345".)	Image
Mill Of Drum (Mill Of Crathes On Map) Se Mill				57°03′42″N 2°23′42″W	Category B	3111	Upload Photo
Old Parish Church Of Drumoak, Dalmaik				57°04′39″N 2°18′29″W	Category B	3080	Upload Photo
Old Manse Croft Dalmaik Outbuildings				57°04′39″N 2°18′32″W	Category C(S)	3083	Upload Photo
Manse Of Drumoak Including Terrace And Offices				57°04′46″N 2°20′06″W	Category B	3102	Upload Photo
Mill Of Drum Millers House				57°03′42″N 2°23′41″W	Category C(S)	3112	Upload Photo
Old Parish Church Of Drumoak, Churchyard				57°04′38″N 2°18′29″W	Category C(S)	3081	Upload Photo
Park House, Symbol Stone				57°04′10″N 2°21′51″W	Category B	3106	Upload Photo
Belskavie Tower				57°05′33″N 2°17′38″W	Category C(S)	3078	Upload Photo
Drum Castle				57°05′42″N 2°20′17″W	Category A	3113	Upload another image See more images
Park Bridge Over River Dee				57°04′27″N 2°20′14″W	Category A	45	Upload Photo
Park Bridge Tollhouse				57°04′29″N 2°20′21″W	Category C(S)	3110	Upload Photo
Drum Castle, Walled Garden				57°05′47″N 2°20′02″W	Category B	3115	Upload another image See more images
Drum Castle Lodge				57°05′55″N 2°18′28″W	Category B	3077	Upload another image
Old Manse Dalmaik				57°04′40″N 2°18′31″W	Category B	3082	Upload Photo
Park House, Sundial				57°04′06″N 2°21′52″W	Category C(S)	3104	Upload Photo
Park House, Icehouse				57°04′09″N 2°21′42″W	Category C(S)	3105	Upload Photo
Mains Of Drum				57°05′18″N 2°19′32″W	Category C(S)	3079	Upload Photo
Park House				57°04′06″N 2°21′52″W	Category A	3103	Upload Photo
Park House, Old West Lodge				57°03′55″N 2°22′51″W	Category B	3109	Upload Photo
Drum Castle, Chapel				57°05′41″N 2°20′19″W	Category B	3114	Upload another image See more images
North Coldstream, Farmhouse				57°05′39″N 2°21′37″W	Category C(S)	3075	Upload Photo
Milton Of Drum Bridge Over Gormack Burn				57°06′12″N 2°20′21″W	Category C(S)	3076	Upload Photo
Drumoak Parish Church				57°05′04″N 2°20′39″W	Category B	3101	Upload Photo
Park House, Walled Garden				57°04′16″N 2°21′54″W	Category B	3107	Upload Photo
Park House Mausoleum				57°04′04″N 2°22′06″W	Category B	3108	Upload Photo

== Key ==
The scheme for classifying buildings in Scotland is:

- Category A: "buildings of national or international importance, either architectural or historic; or fine, little-altered examples of some particular period, style or building type."
- Category B: "buildings of regional or more than local importance; or major examples of some particular period, style or building type, which may have been altered."
- Category C: "buildings of local importance; lesser examples of any period, style, or building type, as originally constructed or moderately altered; and simple traditional buildings which group well with other listed buildings."

In March 2016 there were 47,288 listed buildings in Scotland. Of these, 8% were Category A, and 50% were Category B, with the remaining 42% being Category C.

== See also ==
- List of listed buildings in Aberdeenshire
