= Milltimber =

Suburb of Aberdeen, Scotland

Coordinates: 57.1052°N 2.2311°W

- Location within the City of Aberdeen
- Population: 3,140 (2020)
- OS grid reference: NJ861016
- Council area: Aberdeen
- Lieutenancy area: Aberdeen
- Country: Scotland
- Sovereign state: United Kingdom
- Post town: MILLTIMBER
- Postcode district: AB13
- Dialling code: 01224
- Police: Scotland
- Fire: Scottish
- Ambulance: Scottish
- UK Parliament: Aberdeen South
- Scottish Parliament: Aberdeen South and North Kincardine

Milltimber is a suburb of Aberdeen, Scotland, around 6 miles (10 km) west of Aberdeen city centre. From 1854 to 1937 the area was served by Milltimber railway station on the Aberdeen suburban railway.

Along with the nearby settlements of Cults and Bieldside, it is home to some of the wealthiest residents of Aberdeen. Facilities in Milltimber are somewhat lacking, with the nearest shop situated in neighbouring Bieldside. However, it is home to a highly rated primary school, a church, and a community building which is used for private functions as well as Boy Scout and Girl Guide troops and similar. Kippie Lodge is a sports and social club, with a 9-hole golf course, swimming pool, sports complex, creche and restaurant. Next to the lodge are the playing fields of the independent Albyn School.

In 2009, property website Zoopla listed Milltimber's postcode, AB13, as the most expensive in Scotland with an average house price of £422,760.
