= Majel Davidson =

British artist

- Born: Margaret Elizabeth Jemima Davidson; 1885; Cults, Aberdeen
- Died: 1969 (aged 83–84)
- Education: Gray's School of Art
- Known for: Painting, pottery

Margaret Elizabeth Jemima Davidson, known as Majel Davidson, (1885-1969) was a Scottish artist known for her painting and pottery work.

== Biography ==
Davidson was born at Cults in Aberdeen and attended Aberdeen High School before studying painting and pottery at Gray's School of Art from 1904 to 1907. A scholarship award allowed her to study in Paris throughout 1908 and 1909 with the artist Charles Guérin. and in Rome in 1910. Davidson exhibited at the Salon d'Automne in 1912. During World War One she served as a volunteer ambulance driver, earning the Military Medal for her work.

In 1923 Davidson moved to Toronto and for a time was associated with the circle of artists known as the Group of Seven, which led to her paintings becoming increasing impressionist and bolder in their use of colour. When Davidson returned to Scotland she took a role with the International Council of Women and in her artistic career chose to concentrate on producing pottery and had a kiln built at the family home in Cults. Named Gushetneuk Pottery, after the Doric dialect word for an odd corner of a field, several pieces are on display at the Aberdeen Art Gallery, including a fine art deco rosebowl.

In the 1950s Davidson moved to the female community, known as the Powis Family, or The Powis House Ladies, at Powis House near Stirling and resumed painting. Davidson exhibited several times with the Aberdeen Artists Society and in 1989 the Portland Gallery held a joint show of her work alongside that of Alexander Graham Munro. In 2004, the Macrobert Art Centre held an exhibition of her work.
