= Park Bridge, Aberdeenshire =

19th century bridge in Aberdeenshire, Scotland

Park Bridge
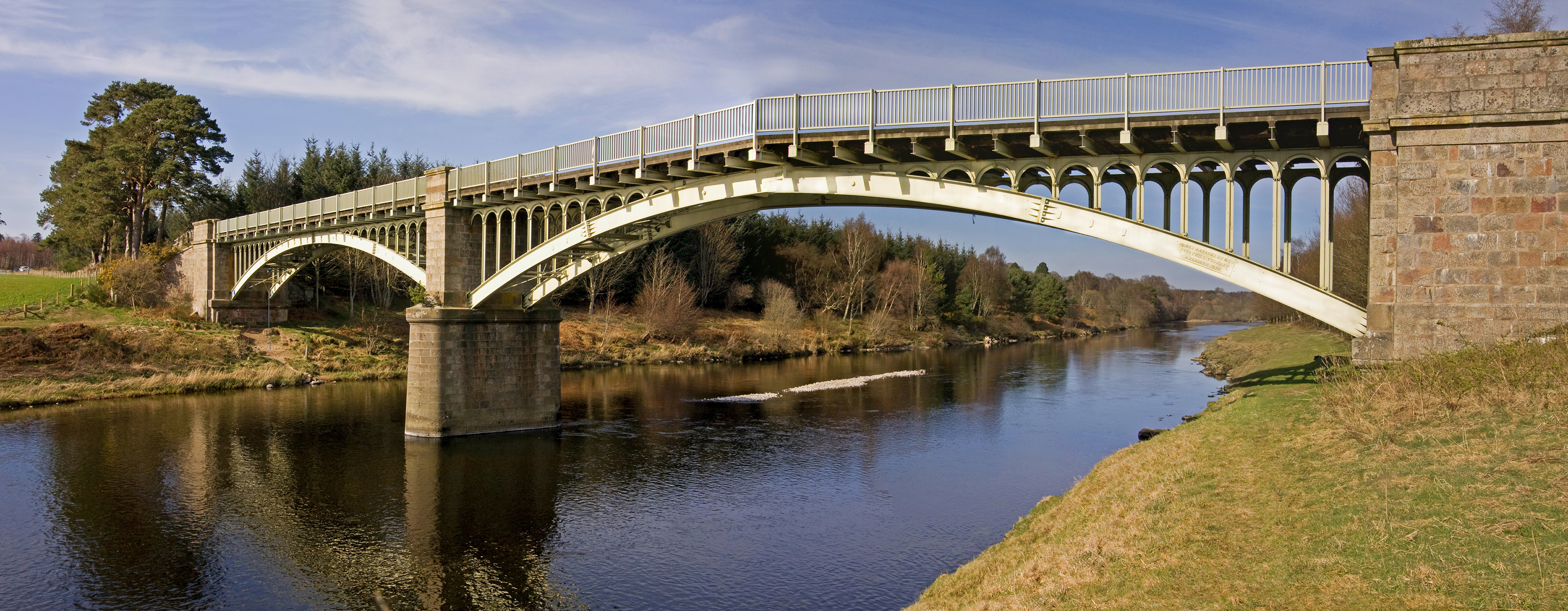
- Bridge across the River Dee
- Coordinates: 57.07418°N 2.33723°W
- OS grid reference: NO 79653 98179
- Crosses: River Dee
- Locale: Aberdeenshire
- Preceded by: Durris Bridge
- Followed by: Maryculter Bridge

Characteristics
- Design: Arch
- Material: Cast iron

History
- Designer: John Willet
- Built: 1854

Listed Building – Category A
- Official name: Park Bridge Over River Dee
- Designated: 15 April 1971
- Reference no.: LB45

Location
- Interactive map of Park Bridge

Park Bridge is a road bridge in Aberdeenshire, Scotland which crosses the River Dee. It is currently open to pedestrians and cyclists, and it also carried vehicular traffic until February 2019.

== History ==
Park Bridge was built in 1854 by the Deeside Railway to improve southern access to its line and Park railway station. Until 1962, the bridge was tolled. On 16 April 1971, the bridge became Category A Listed.

The bridge was closed to vehicular traffic in February 2019 following the discovery of structural defects during a routine inspection.

== Construction ==
Park Bridge has two cast-iron arches each 120 feet (37 m) long, supported by masonry piers. The deck is constructed from wood. The bridge was designed by engineer John Willet and its ironwork was manufactured by James Abernethy of Aberdeen.

== Gallery ==
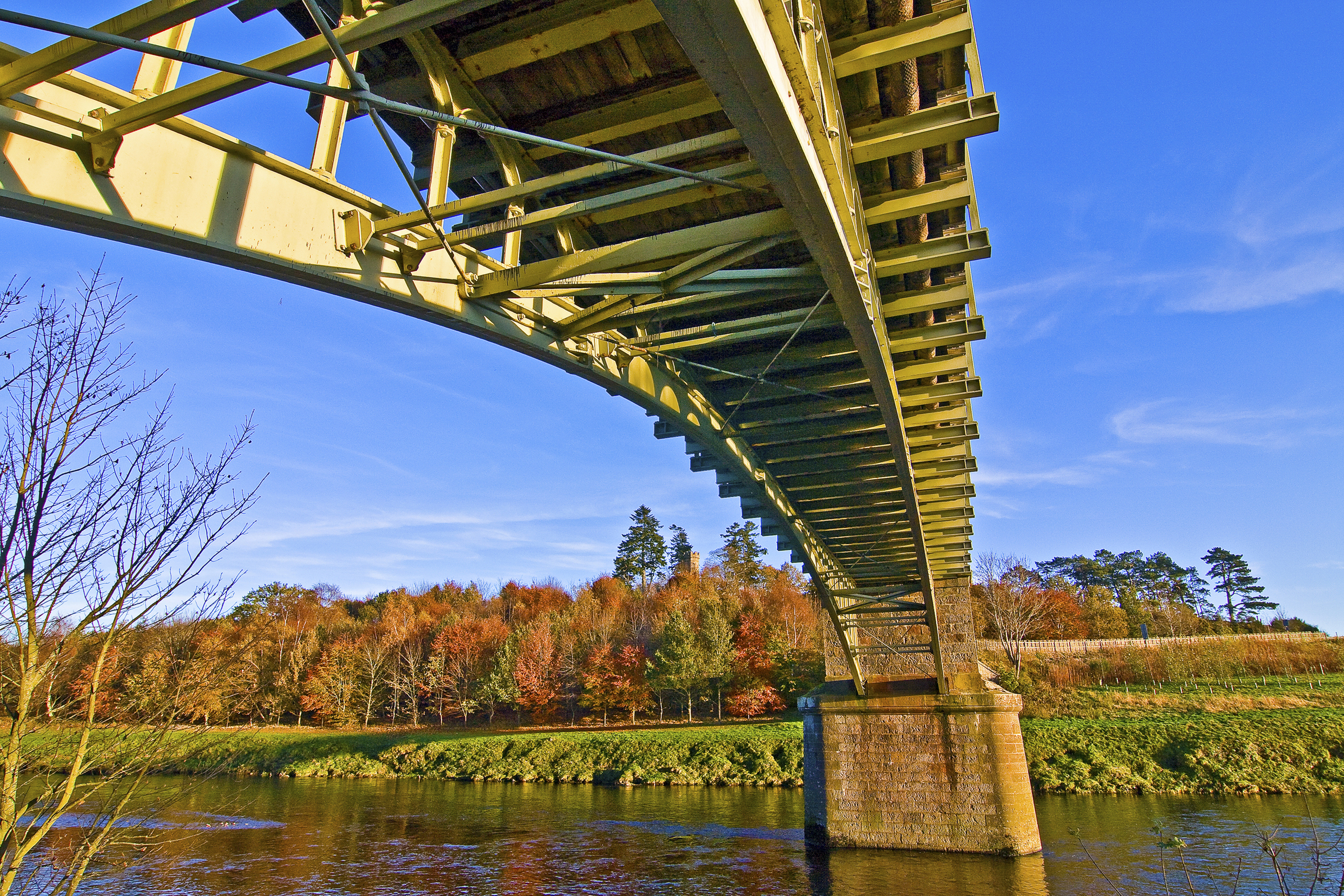
Underside of bridge

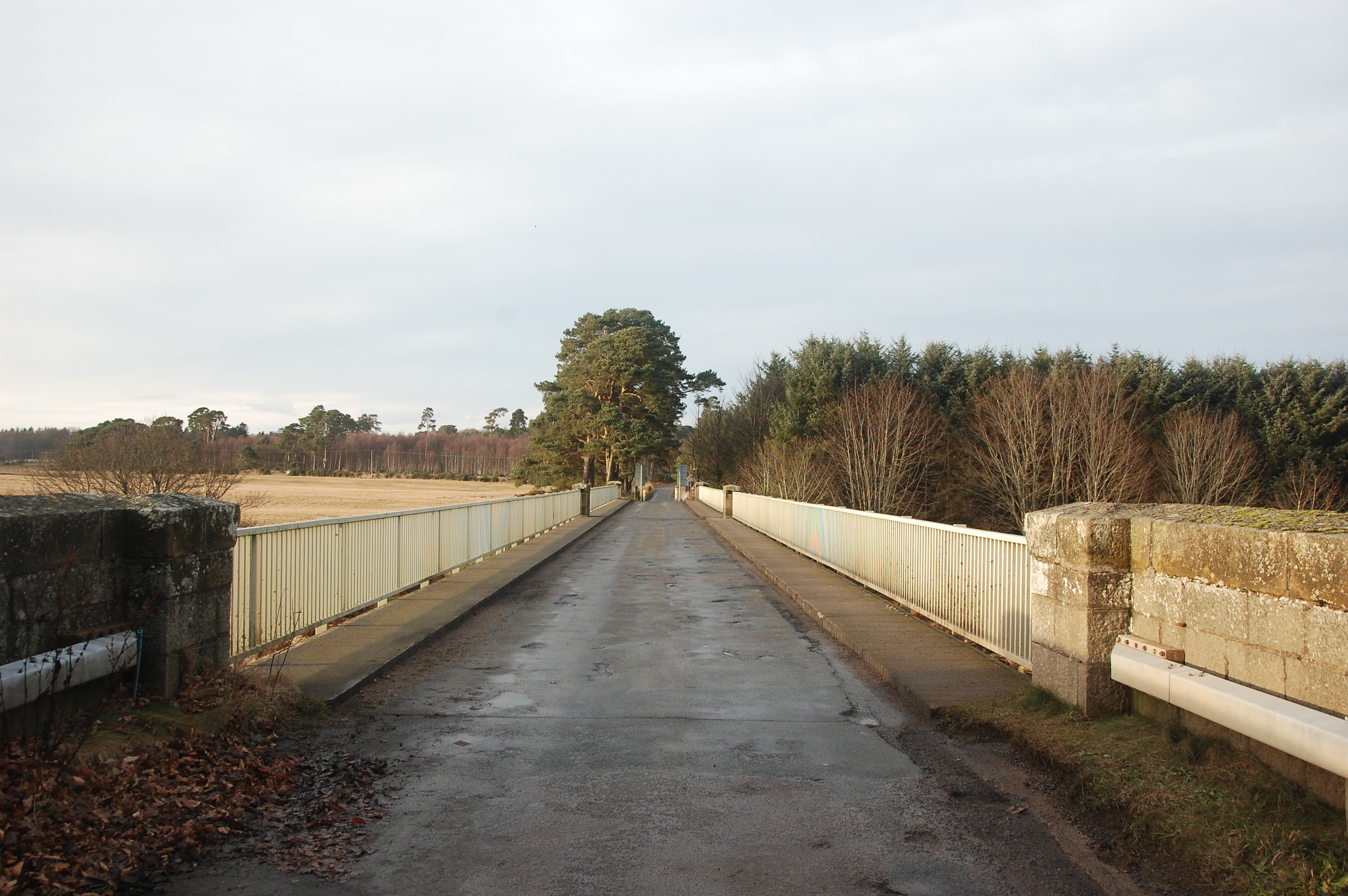
Bridge's surface

== See also ==
- List of bridges in Scotland
