= Cults, Aberdeen =

Suburb of Aberdeen, Scotland

Coordinates: 57.118720°N 2.173871°W

Cults: Scottish Gaelic: A' Chùilt; Scots: Cults
- Location within the Aberdeen City council area Location within Scotland
- Population: 3,500 + (2005)
- OS grid reference: NJ895031
- Council area: Aberdeen City
- Lieutenancy area: Aberdeenshire
- Country: Scotland
- Sovereign state: United Kingdom
- Post town: ABERDEEN
- Postcode district: AB15
- Dialling code: 01224
- Police: Scotland
- Fire: Scottish
- Ambulance: Scottish
- UK Parliament: Aberdeen South
- Scottish Parliament: Aberdeen South and North Kincardine

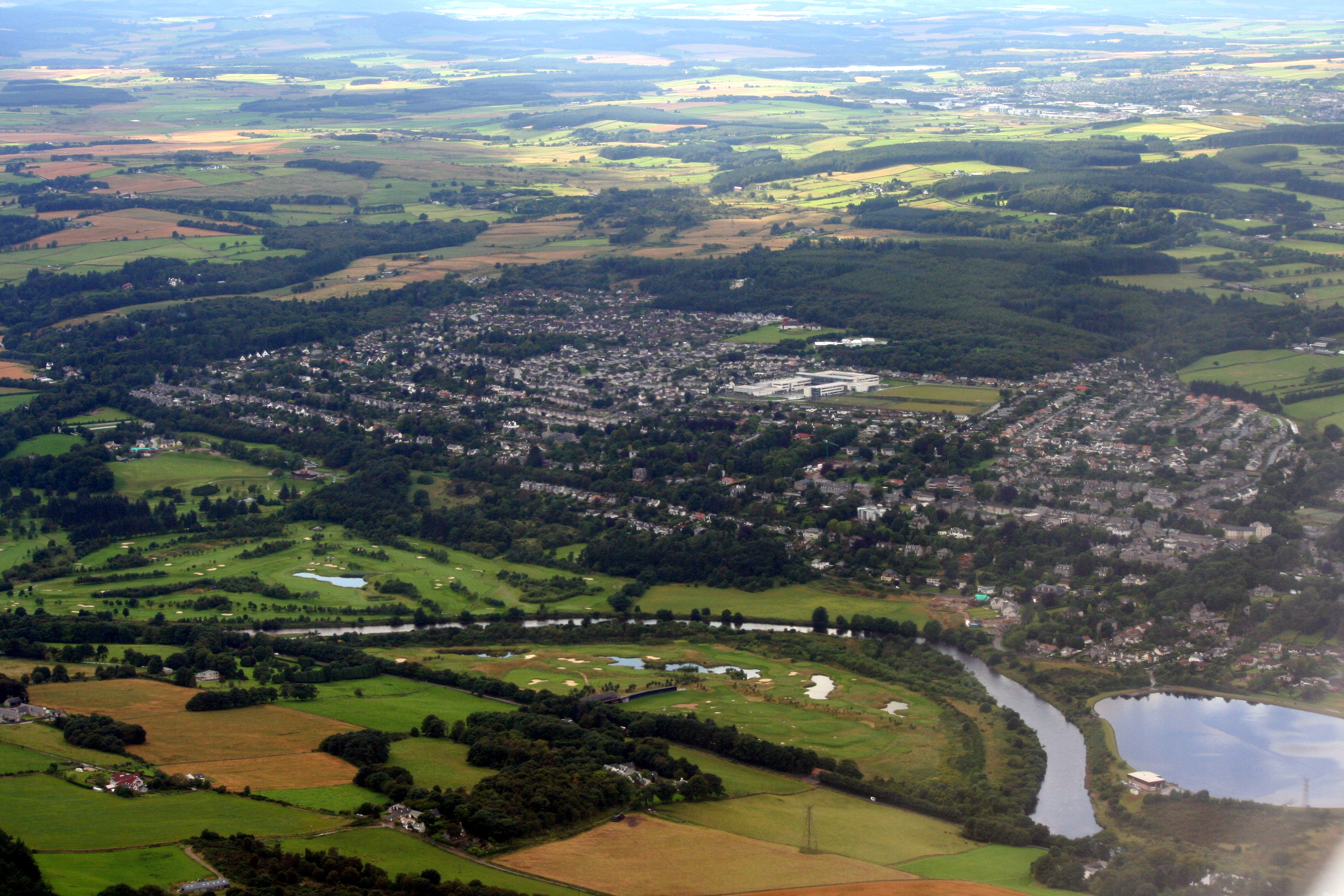
An aerial shot of Cults, River Dee and Inchgarth reservoir

Cults (/ˈkʌlts/ KULTS) is a suburb on the western edge of Aberdeen, Scotland. It lies on the banks of the River Dee and marks the eastern boundary of Royal Deeside.

Cults, known for its historic granite housing, sits approximately six miles from the coast of the North Sea. Cults maintains village status and many of the societal structures found in a country village, despite its proximity to the west of Aberdeen. The name is a corruption of Coilltean, the Scottish Gaelic word for "Woods". There are various green spaces in Cults, the largest of these being Allan Park, a public park situated near the golf club and the River Dee. The park is also home to the Cults Cricket Club.

== History ==
Originally, Cults had two railway stations on the Royal Deeside Railway Line, West Cults and Cults before the line was closed in the middle of the 20th century. The route has since been converted into a cycle path and walkway which leads to Duthie Park in Aberdeen in one direction and further into Deeside in the other, running alongside Cults' public park, Allan Park. Cults was also on a tram route between Aberdeen and Bieldside, operated by the Aberdeen Suburban Tramways Company until 1927. Today, public transport to Aberdeen takes the form of buses.

== Notable people ==
- Rev Thomas Jackson Crawford DD FRSE was minister of Cults, living in the manse
- Majel Davidson, artist
- Stuart Holden, retired United States national team player, TV analyst, and co-owner of RCD Mallorca
- Anna (Nan) Shepherd, writer, literary critic, and teacher
- Archibald Smith, recipient of the Victoria Cross

== Amenities ==
Cults is served by a variety of small shops, churches, modest-sized hotels and eateries, mostly situated in the village centre. Key amongst them are: the golf-themed Cults Hotel; the Deeside Golf Club (shared with Bieldside.) Similarly, the local shop situated on Kirk Brae (commonly known as 'Archie's') has been a mainstay of Cults since the 1970s. Cults is also home to Cults Parish Church, which was formed by the merger of the Cults East and Cults West parishes, with the buildings of the former now housing an outreach centre. There are several local shops operating, including a family run toy shop (Will's toy shop / Alexander R Will), a gift, furniture and interior shop (Sonya Angus) and a number of hairdressers. Cults was also once home to the Stakis-owned Royal Darroch Hotel which exploded on an October morning in 1983 due to gas build up, killing six staff and guests. A few chain stores have branches in Cults, along with C.K.D Galbraith and the Bank of Scotland.

== Education ==
There are three main schools in the village: the state-run Cults Primary School and Cults Academy (one of Scotland's top-performing secondary schools). The village is also only a short drive from the International School of Aberdeen (ISA) in Pitfodels and a complex of Rudolf Steiner Camphill schools in Bieldside.
