= Bieldside =

Suburb of Aberdeen, Scotland

Coordinates: 57.11240°N 2.19811°W

- Location within the Aberdeen City council area Location within Scotland
- Council area: Aberdeen City
- Lieutenancy area: Aberdeen
- Country: Scotland
- Sovereign state: United Kingdom
- Post town: ABERDEEN
- Postcode district: AB15
- Dialling code: 01224
- Police: Scotland
- Fire: Scottish
- Ambulance: Scottish

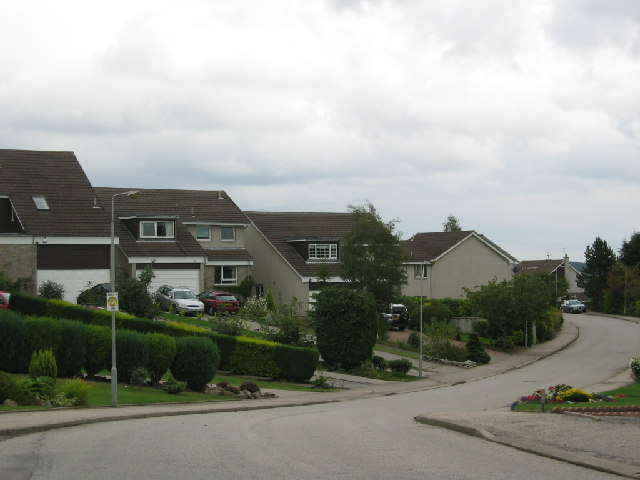

Bieldside is a suburb to the west of Aberdeen City Centre, Scotland. Together with the neighbouring suburb of Cults, it is the wealthiest area in Scotland. It has one pub/restaurant, The Bieldside, a foodstore, a hairdresser, a tea room and a charity shop. The Old Deeside railway line (now the Deeside Way) passes through Bieldside, and Queen Victoria would often stop at Bieldside on her regular journeys between her summer retreat at Balmoral and the city centre.

Bieldside is attributed as one of the wealthiest areas in Scotland, and is home to the most millionaires per postcode outside London. Its residents include former UK Open winner Paul Lawrie and Stewart Milne.

== Notable residents ==
Dalhebity House, Bieldside was the home of William Smith Gill, and his daughter Ruth Roche, Baroness Fermoy was born here, later to become the maternal grandmother of Diana, Princess of Wales.

Bieldside has some of the richest people in the United Kingdom as residents, including the oil billionaire Sir Ian Wood, Stewart Milne, owner of a construction group and reported to be worth £400 million, and oil company directors Ian Suttie and Bob Keiller, who all occupy high places in the Sunday Times Rich List, worth over £50 million.

Former Deputy First Minister of Scotland Nicol Stephen was brought up in Bieldside.

The Bieldside postcode area has the most millionaires outside London.

== Prehistory ==
The Bieldside Cairn (OS Grid reference. NJ 883 028) is a large prehistoric burial cairn, now located within a housing estate.

== Education ==
Bieldside houses many English and Americans in the oil profession. The majority of Bieldside children go to Cults Primary School, then on to Cults Academy or nearby International School of Aberdeen or Private Schools in the city centre. Cults Academy pupils achieve extremely high Standard Grade and Higher exam results and in 2008 received The Sunday Times Scottish State Secondary School of the Year Award and in recent history has never dropped out of the top three schools in Scotland.

== Disability Centres ==
There are two Camphill Communities at Bieldside, Newton Dee Village and a set of Camphill schools known as Murtle Estate for 3 to 19 year olds, providing Curative Education for those with learning disabilities, including deprivation and autism. Another Camphill school (Camphill Estate) is in nearby Milltimber.
