= West Cults railway station =

Railway station in Aberdeenshire, Scotland

West Cults
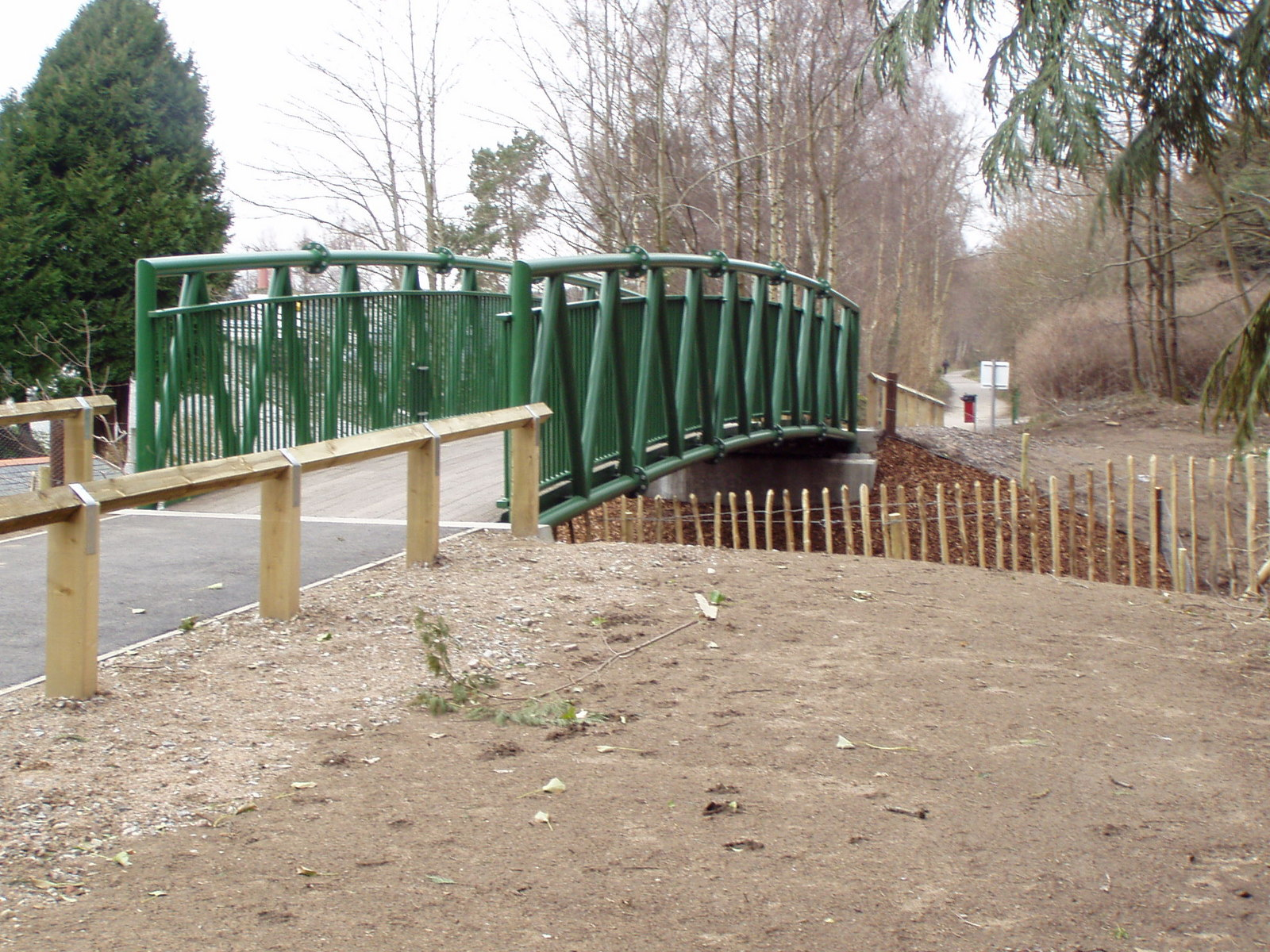
- Footbridge replacing railway bridge near the old station site

General information
- Location: Aberdeen, Aberdeenshire; Scotland
- Coordinates: 57.114183°N 2.183681°W
- Grid reference: NJ882022
- Platforms: 2

Other information
- Status: Disused

History
- Original company: Great North of Scotland Railway
- Pre-grouping: Great North of Scotland Railway
- Post-grouping: LNER

Key dates
- 1 August 1894: Station opened
- 5 April 1937: Station closed to passengers
- 18 July 1966: Line closed entirely
Location

West Cults railway station served the small suburban village of West Cults area within the parish of Peterculter from 1894 to 1937 on the Deeside Railway that ran from Aberdeen (Joint) to Ballater. It lay very close to Cults and Bieldside.

== History ==
The station was opened in August 1894 as part of the Aberdeen suburban service on the Deeside branch and at first the branch services were operated by the Deeside Railway. Later the line became part of the GNoSR who opened West Cults and at grouping merged with the London and North Eastern Railway. West Cults is likely to have become an unstaffed halt circa 1930 and was closed to passengers on 5 April 1937 as a part of the withdrawal of the Aberdeen suburban service. The station probably became unstaffed at the same time as Murtle and Milltimber with the aforementioned closure of the Aberdeen suburban service. After its closure in 1937 the line itself remained open to Ballater until 1966. The line has been lifted and this sections forms part of the Deeside Way long-distance footpath.

== Infrastructure ==
The main wooden station building stood on the eastbound side with its 'hipped roof', had a waiting room, ticket office, staff accommodation and toilets, similar to those at Torphins, Lumphanan, Murtle and elsewhere on the line. It did not possess a goods yard, sidings or points on the double track line. A curling pond stood close by in Cults Park that would have attracted participating passengers on match days.

The line had been doubled in 1892, a stone stationmasters house built, together with a wooden pedestrian overbridge, but no signal box and a small wooden shelter located on the westbound platform. The signals were operated by the stationmaster who had orders to put them at danger whilst a train was in the station. In 1908 the signals and ground frame were removed.

In 1963 the station, closed since 1937, was now on a single track section of line with the station house still standing however the old station buildings and pedestrian bridge had been demolished by this date. The westbound side of the track was the first to be lifted.

== Services ==
In 1928 the suburban railway, locally called the 'subbies' started additionally operating Sunday services to Culter however due to competition with the buses it was announced on 28 January 1937 that the service would cease altogether in April 1937, Sunday services having ceased in 1936.

== The site today ==
One platform of Aberdeenshire granite remains in situ. The Royal Deeside Railway is located at Milton of Crathes some distance down the line towards Ballater.

== Sources ==
- Butt, R. V. J. (October 1995). The Directory of Railway Stations: details every public and private passenger station, halt, platform and stopping place, past and present (1st ed.). Sparkford: Patrick Stephens Ltd. ISBN 978-1-85260-508-7. OCLC 60251199. OL 11956311M.
- Maxtone, Graham and Cooper, Mike (2018). Then and Now on the Great North. V.1. GNoSR Association. ISBN 978-0902343-30-6.

Preceding station	Historical railways	Following station
Cults; Line and station closed	Great North of Scotland Railway; Deeside Railway	Bieldside; Line and station closed
