= Cults railway station =

Disused railway station in Scotland

Cults
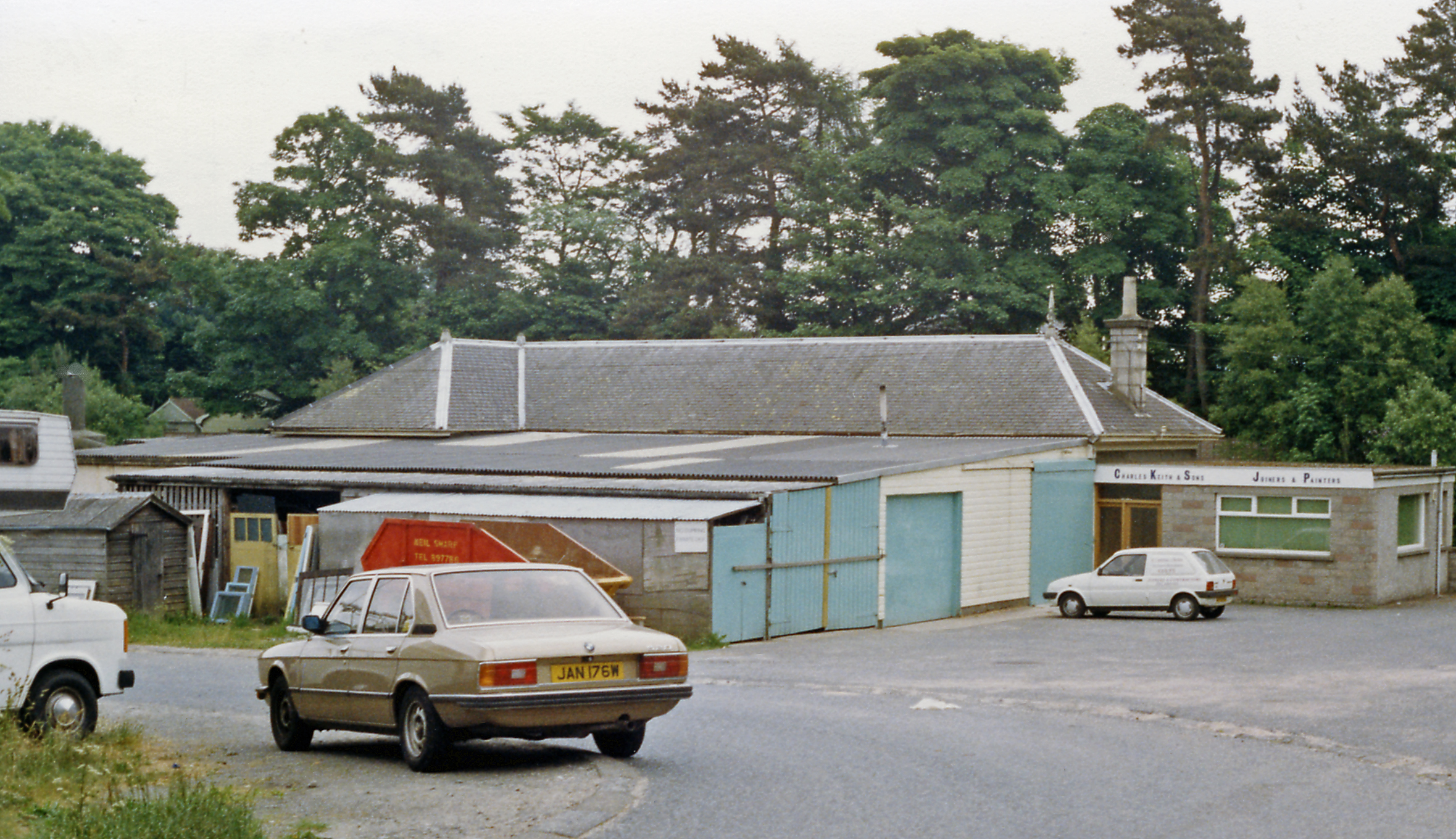
- The old Cults station site in 1988

General information
- Location: Cults, Aberdeenshire; Scotland
- Coordinates: 57.1178°N 2.1707°W
- Grid reference: NJ897029
- Platforms: 2

Other information
- Status: Disused

History
- Original company: Deeside Railway
- Pre-grouping: Great North of Scotland Railway
- Post-grouping: LNER

Key dates
- 8 September 1853: Station opened
- 1855: GNoSR station opened
- 28 February 1966: Station closed to passengers
- 02 January 1967: Line closed to freight
Location

Cults railway station was opened on 8 September 1853 by the Deeside Railway and served part of Cults with mansion houses such as Southfield, Wellwood, Woodbank, Inchgarth, Drumgarth and Norwood nearby. The Deeside Railway station was replaced in 1855 by a new GNoSR that remained open, despite the 1937 closure of many other stations on the Aberdeen suburban service, until 1966 as an intermediate station on the Deeside Railway that ran from Aberdeen (Joint) to Ballater. Cults is located in the parish of Peterculter, Aberdeenshire, Scotland.

== History ==
The first station was opened in 1853 and was replaced in 1855 by a new station on the Deeside branch and from the start its services were operated by the Deeside Railway. The original station is thought to have been close to Cults House. Later the line became part of the GNoSR and at grouping merged with the London and North Eastern Railway. It stood 3.75 miles (6 km) from Aberdeen and 39.5 miles (63.5 km) from Ballater. In 1920 the stationmaster was Peter Walker. It was closed to passengers on 28 February 1966. The line has been lifted and sections form part of the Deeside Way long-distance footpath.

== Infrastructure ==
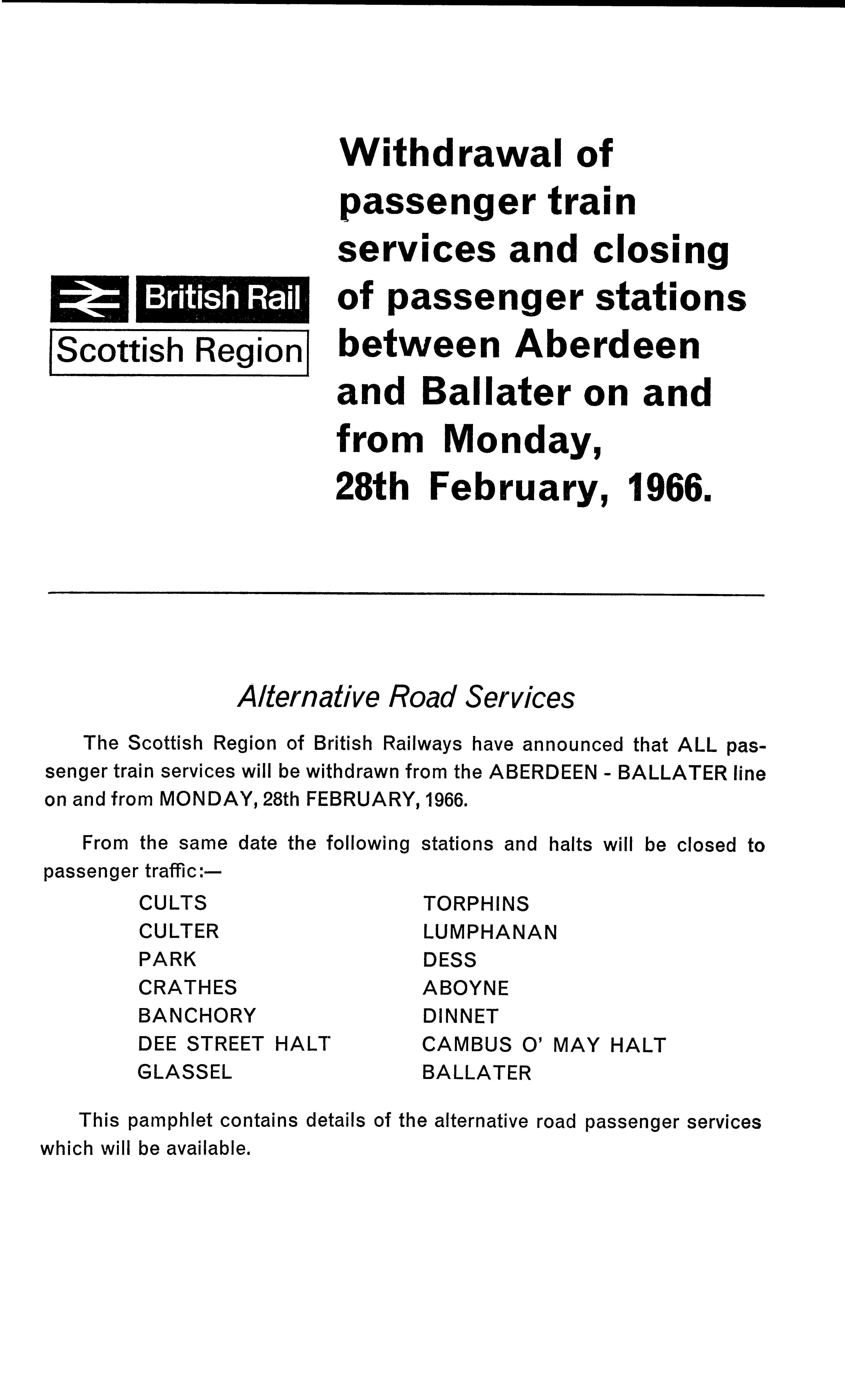
The 1966 BRB Closure notice.

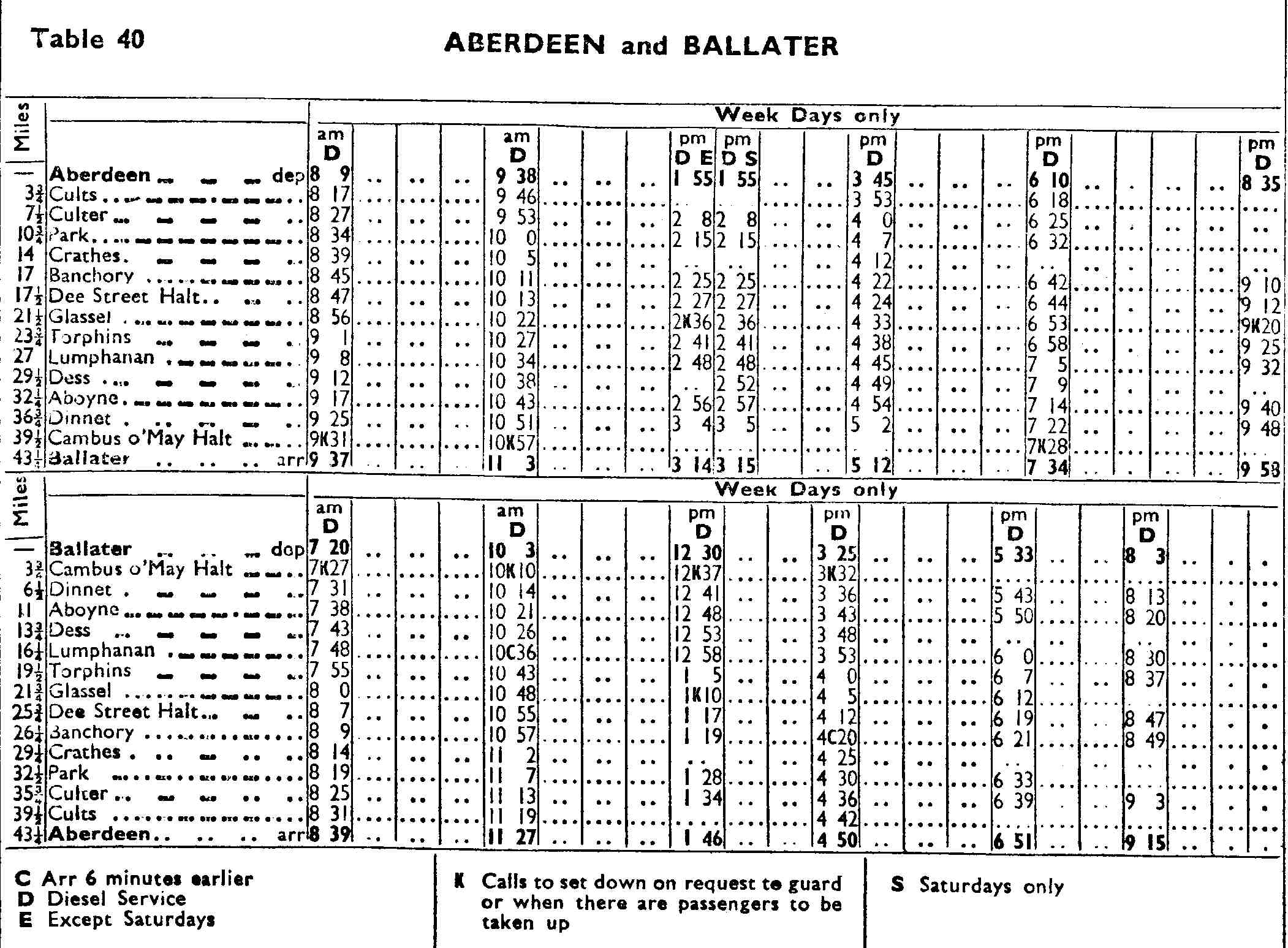
The 1963 timetable.

The wooden 1855 station originally only had a single platform on the later eastbound side of the then single track line with one siding to the south running to the west. By 1884 the line had been doubled and a goods yard built on the eastern side with two sidings, approached from the east. A pedestrian footbridge was present, a small signal box on the eastern end of the eastbound platform and a small shelter on the westbound platform. Crossover points lay to the east end of the platforms. At some point the public open area at the station was partitioned off.

By 1951 the line had been singled with the westbound track lifted and the signalbox removed. The goods yard had a number of buildings present together with the two sidings still present.

== Services ==
Suburban services, "subbies", began between Aberdeen and Culter in 1894, calling at all eight intermediate stations in a seven-mile stretch of line in around 20 minutes with a total of around 30 trains every day. The "subbies" service was withdrawn from 5 April 1937.

The line was chosen to trial the battery multiple unit and once introduced on 21 April 1958 the train service was doubled to six trains a day and in addition a Sunday service was reinstated. Cults, unlike stations such as Cambus O'May was not a request stop.

== The site today ==
The modified and enlarged main station building survives as a workshop and both platforms remain with the trackbed in use as part of the Deeside Way. The Royal Deeside Railway is located at Milton of Crathes some distance down the line towards Ballater. In 2021, a planning application was lodged to turn the former station building into a 250 plus seater Bistro restaurant utilising the workshop areas towards the North of the Building and Outdoor Space to the East of the building as well as the original platform.

== Sources ==
- Butt, R. V. J. (October 1995). The Directory of Railway Stations: details every public and private passenger station, halt, platform and stopping place, past and present (1st ed.). Sparkford: Patrick Stephens Ltd. ISBN 978-1-85260-508-7. OCLC 60251199. OL 11956311M.
- Maxtone, Graham and Cooper, Mike (2018). Then and Now on the Great North. V.1. GNoSR Association. ISBN 978-0902343-30-6.

Preceding station	Historical railways	Following station
Pitfodels; Line and station closed	Great North of Scotland Railway; Deeside Railway	West Cults; Line and station closed
