= Drumoak =

Coordinates: 57.08622°N 2.338277°W

Drumoak: Scottish Gaelic: Druim M'Aodhaig
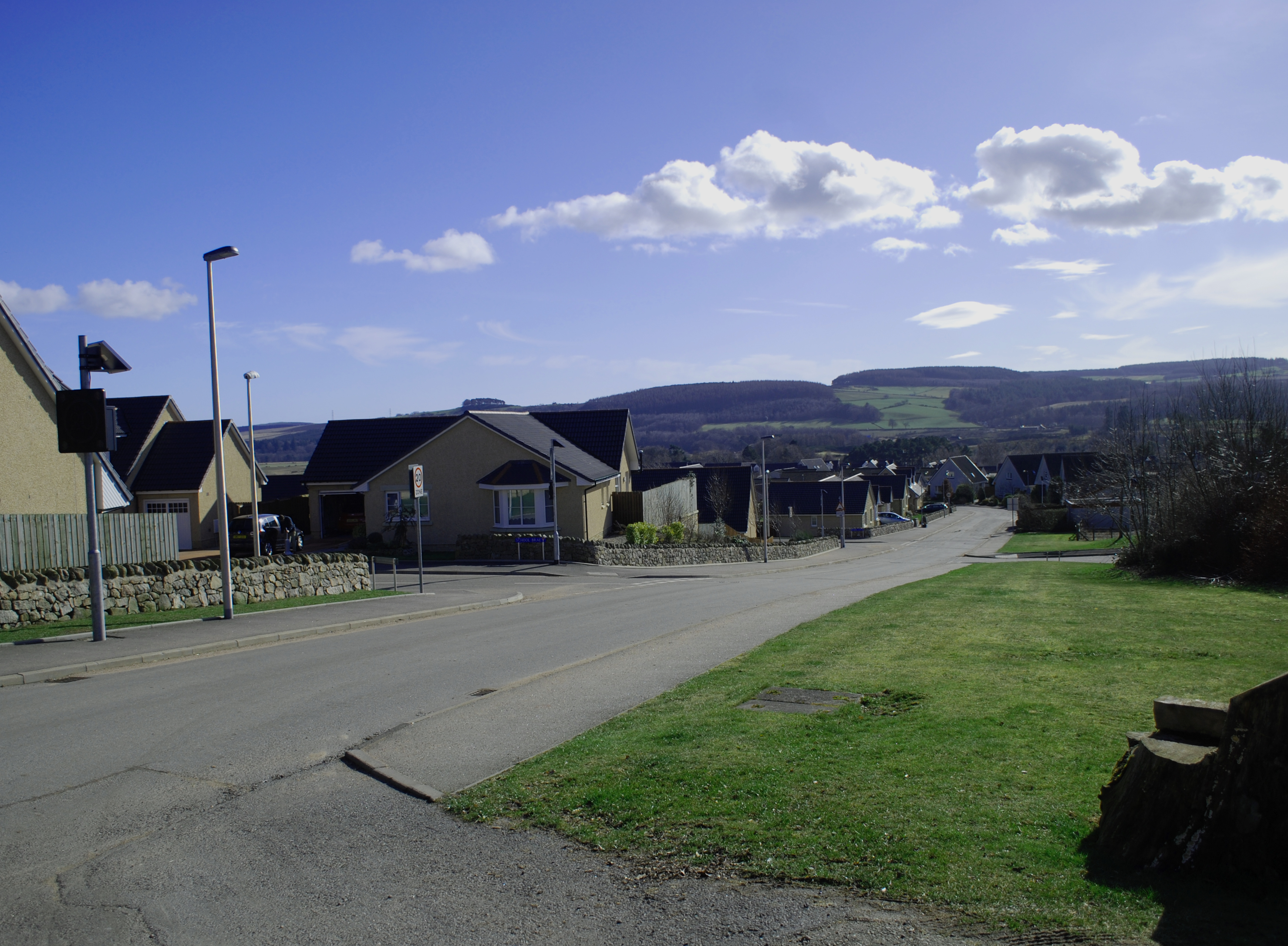
- Drumoak village

- Location within Aberdeenshire
- Population: 910 (2020)
- OS grid reference: NO7999
- Council area: Aberdeenshire
- Lieutenancy area: Aberdeenshire
- Country: Scotland
- Sovereign state: United Kingdom
- Postcode district: AB
- Police: Scotland
- Fire: Scottish
- Ambulance: Scottish
- UK Parliament: West Aberdeenshire and Kincardine
- Scottish Parliament: Aberdeenshire West

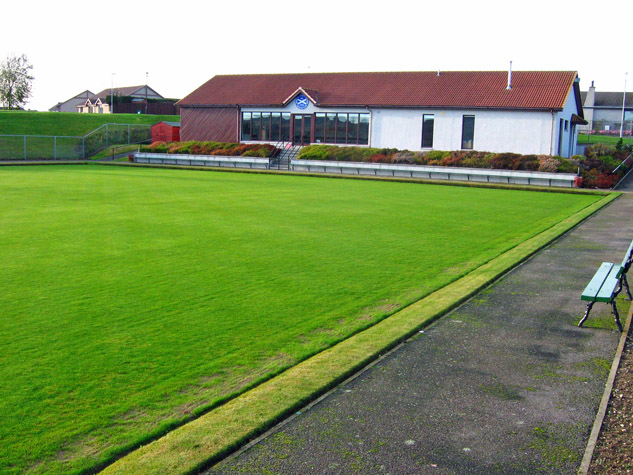
Drumoak and district bowling green

Drumoak (/drəˈmoʊk/, Scottish Gaelic: Druim M'Aodhaig, lit. 'the ridge of St Aodhag') is a village situated between Peterculter and Banchory in North Deeside, Aberdeenshire, Scotland, which is classified as a town by the Understanding Scottish Places programme. Drumoak is near the River Dee, with Park Bridge, named for the local Park Estate, being a local crossing; Park Estate, was formerly owned by the railway engineer Sir Robert Williams; Sir Robert is interred at Drumoak.

There is a church, small shop (located in Park), bowling green and the, now demolished, Irvine Arms restaurant pub (aptly named after the family that owned the 13th century Drum Castle). Drum Castle is run by the National Trust for Scotland and is open to visitors. Relics and portraits of the Irvine family are kept here, and it was conferred by Robert the Bruce onto William de Irvine. There are a number of housing developments progressing; a new primary school and nursery with over 100 pupils serves Drumoak. The Dee River gravels also attract gravel extraction on both sides of the river.

Drumoak Manse in 1638 was the birthplace of James Gregory, discoverer of diffraction gratings a year after Newton's prism experiments, and inventor of the Gregorian telescope design in 1663. The design is still used today in telescopes such as the Arecibo Radio Telescope upgraded to a Gregorian design in 1997 giving Arecibo a flexibility it had not previously possessed. His older brother David was also born there in 1620.

Between Drumoak and Peterculter is the site of a Roman encampment Normandykes

== History ==
A history of Drumoak was commissioned by the Kirk Session of Drumoak Parish Church in 2000 in order to commemorate the second millennium. It was entitled The Parish of Drumoak and was written by Robin Jackson.

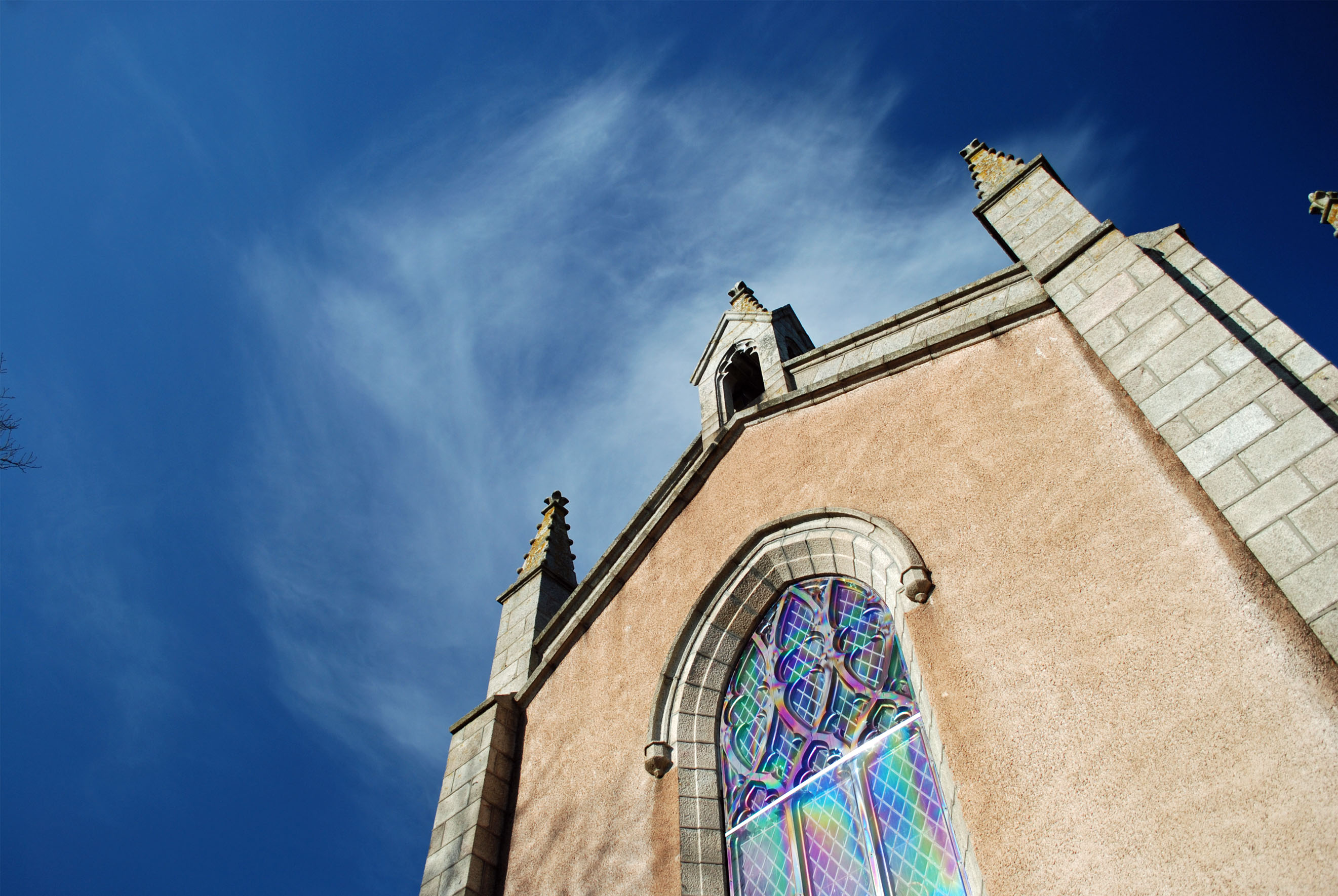
Drumoak Church

== See also ==
- Balfour
- Lower Deeside
- Drum railway station
