= Murtle railway station =

Railway station in Aberdeenshire, Scotland

Murtle
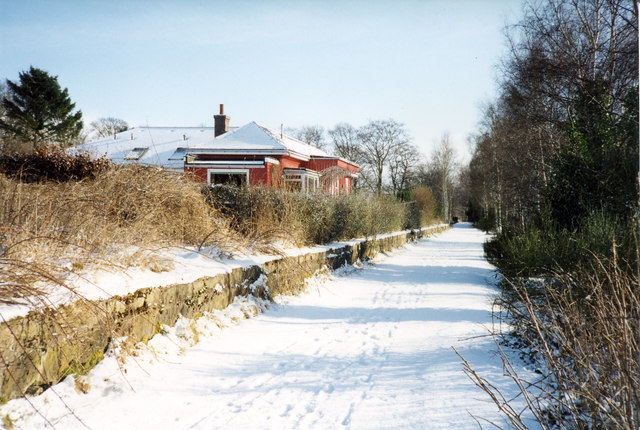
- Murtle station site in 2002.

General information
- Location: Bieldside, Aberdeenshire; Scotland
- Coordinates: 57.1074°N 2.2125°W
- Grid reference: NJ872018
- Platforms: 2

Other information
- Status: Disused

History
- Original company: Deeside Railway
- Pre-grouping: Great North of Scotland Railway
- Post-grouping: LNER

Key dates
- 8 September 1853: Station opened
- 17 August 1909: Rebuilding after a fire
- 5 April 1937: Station closed to passengers
- 18 July 1966: Line closed entirely
Location

Murtle railway station, later Murtle Halt railway station served Murtle and Beaconhill Houses and estates, the Mill of Murtle, Milton of Murtle, the local farms and the inhabitants of this rural area within the parish of Peterculter from 1853 to 1937 on the Deeside Railway that ran from Aberdeen (Joint) to Ballater.

== History ==
The station was opened on 8 September 1853 on the Deeside branch and at first its services were operated by the Deeside Railway. Later it became part of the GNoSR and at grouping merged with the London and North Eastern Railway. Murtle became an unstaffed halt circa 1930 and was closed to passengers on 5 April 1937. It had served as the local post office in 1899. The station was unstaffed in around 1930 and became a halt with its goods services withdrawn. After closure in 1937 the line remained open until 1966. The line has been lifted and this sections forms part of the Deeside Way long-distance footpath. The station was host to a LNER camping coach in 1935 and 1936 and possibly one for some of 1934, it was located in the old loading dock siding.

== Infrastructure ==
The station had a stone built agent's house, with at first a single platform, a waiting room and ticket office building that was originally similar to those at Torphins, Lumphanan and elsewhere on the line. In 1865 the single siding was on the northern side, approached from the east. By 1899 the line had been doubled, a stone agent's house was built, together with a pedestrian overbridge and a signal box located on the westbound platform with a simple wooden shelter. A single siding and loading dock was present with several sets of points and signals in the vicinity.

Murtle acquired some differences in its appearance, especially the small canopy after it was rebuilt following after a fire on 17 August 1909 that destroyed the original wooden main station building. In 1963 the station, closed since 1937, was on a single track section of line with the agent's house still standing together with the old station building.

== Services ==
In 1928 the suburban railway, locally called the 'subbies' started additionally operating Sunday services to Culter however due to competition with the buses it was announced on 28 January 1937 that the service would cease altogether in April 1937, Sunday services having ceased in 1936.

== The site today ==
The much modified and enlarged station buildings survive as private dwellings with both platforms of Aberdeenshire granite remaining in situ, the eastbound being in better condition. The Deeside Way runs past the station. The Royal Deeside Railway is located at Milton of Crathes some distance down the line towards Ballater.

== Sources ==
- Butt, R. V. J. (October 1995). The Directory of Railway Stations: details every public and private passenger station, halt, platform and stopping place, past and present (1st ed.). Sparkford: Patrick Stephens Ltd. ISBN 978-1-85260-508-7. OCLC 60251199. OL 11956311M.
- Maxtone, Graham and Cooper, Mike (2018). Then and Now on the Great North. V.1. GNoSR Association. ISBN 978-0902343-30-6.
- McRae, Andrew (1997). British Railway Camping Coach Holidays: The 1930s & British Railways (London Midland Region). Vol. Scenes from the Past: 30 (Part One). Foxline. ISBN 1-870119-48-7.

| Preceding station | Historical railways | Following station |
|---|---|---|
| Bieldside; Line and station closed | Great North of Scotland Railway; Deeside Railway | Milltimber; Line and station closed |
