= Milltimber railway station =

Former railway station in Scotland

Milltimber
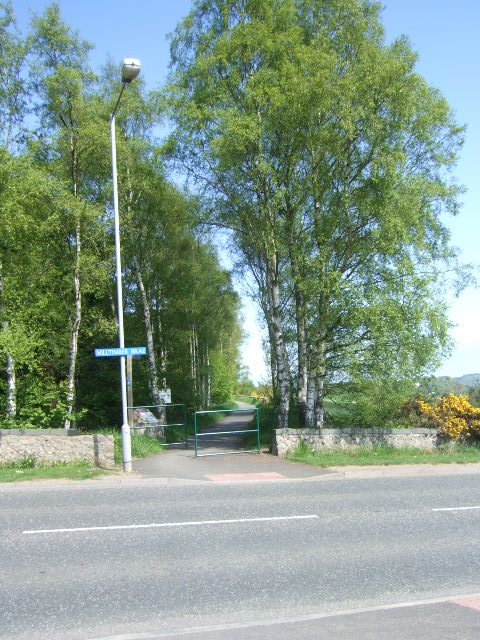
- Site of the old level crossing.

General information
- Location: Aberdeen, Aberdeenshire; Scotland
- Coordinates: 57.1018°N 2.2371°W
- Grid reference: NJ857012
- Platforms: 2

Other information
- Status: Disused

History
- Original company: Deeside Railway
- Pre-grouping: Great North of Scotland Railway
- Post-grouping: LNER

Key dates
- January 1854: Station opened
- 5 April 1937: Station closed to passengers
- 1966: Line closed entirely
Location

Milltimber railway station served the Milltimber area within the parish of Peterculter from 1854 to 1937 on the Deeside Railway that ran from Aberdeen (Joint) to Ballater. This area at that time had a number of mansion houses, estates, etc. such as Culter House, Fairgirth House, Camphill House, Avondow House, Glasterberry House, etc. whose workers, etc. would have used the station. Milltimber was only a short distance from Murtle station. The station was named for the nearby Milltimber Farm.

== History ==
The station was opened in January 1854 on the Deeside branch and at first its services were operated by the Deeside Railway. Later it became part of the GNoSR and at grouping merged with the London and North Eastern Railway. Milltimber is likely to have become an unstaffed halt circa 1930 and was closed to passengers on 5 April 1937. The station was probably unstaffed at the same time as Murtle with the closure of the Aberdeen suburban service, with its goods services also withdrawn. After its closure in 1937 the line itself remained open until 1966. The line has been lifted and this sections forms part of the Deeside Way long-distance footpath although major roadworks have required a diversion from the route of the old trackbed. In 1899 the station had served as a post office.

== Infrastructure ==
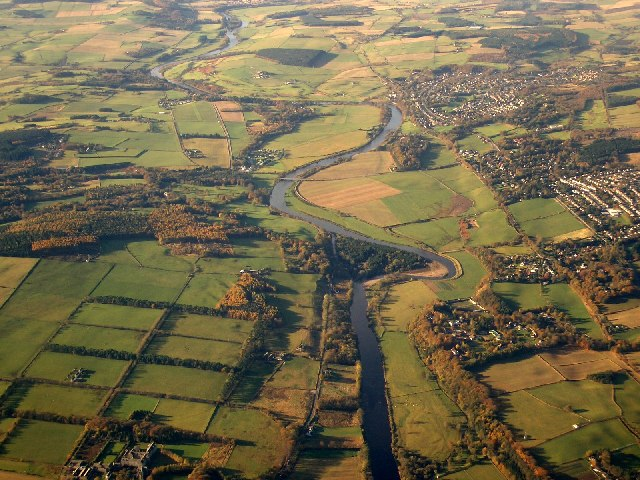
Aerial view of Milltimber

The station had at first a single platform on the northern side of the line with a waiting room and ticket office building that was similar to those at Torphins, Lumphanan and elsewhere on the line. In 1865 the single siding was on the north-east side, approached from the east. By 1899 the line had been doubled, a stone station house was built, together with a wooden pedestrian overbridge and a signal box located on the eastbound platform with a simple wooden shelter. Two sidings, a loading dock and a weighing machine were present in the goods yard now located on the west side of the station with points and signals in the vicinity.

In 1963 the station, closed since 1937, was on a single track section of line with the station house still standing together with the old station building and signal box.

== Services ==
In 1928 the suburban railway, locally called the 'subbies' started additionally operating Sunday services to Culter however due to competition with the buses it was announced on 28 January 1937 that the service would cease altogether in April 1937, Sunday services having ceased in 1936.

== The site today ==
The much modified and enlarged stationmasters or agents house survives as a much enlarged private dwelling with one platform of Aberdeenshire granite remaining in situ, the eastbound. The Deeside Way runs past the station however a diversion is now in place beyond the station due to a major new road, the Western Peripheral Route, and part of the old goods yard site has been lost. The Royal Deeside Railway is located at Milton of Crathes some distance down the line towards Ballater.

== Sources ==
- Butt, R. V. J. (October 1995). The Directory of Railway Stations: details every public and private passenger station, halt, platform and stopping place, past and present (1st ed.). Sparkford: Patrick Stephens Ltd. ISBN 978-1-85260-508-7. OCLC 60251199. OL 11956311M.
- Maxtone, Graham and Cooper, Mike (2018). Then and Now on the Great North. V.1. GNoSR Association. ISBN 978-0902343-30-6.

Preceding station	Historical railways	Following station
Murtle; Line and station closed	Great North of Scotland Railway; Deeside Railway	Culter; Line and station closed
