= British Rail BEMU =

Experimental battery electric multiple unit

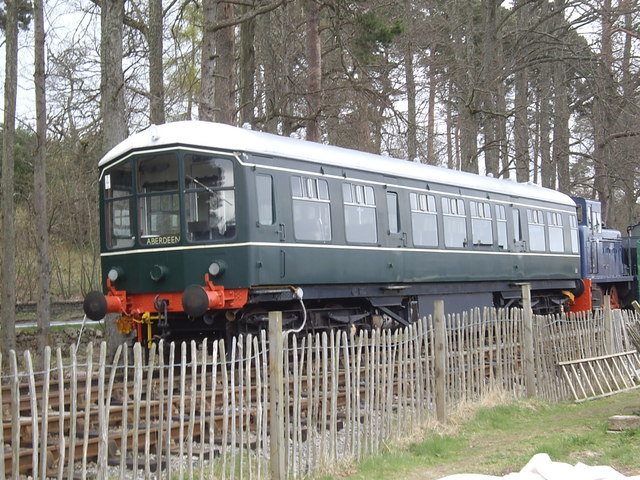
- Battery Multiple Unit at Milton of Crathes
- In service: 1958–1966
- Built at: Derby Works - converted to battery at Cowlairs
- Family name: Derby Lightweight
- Replaced: Steam locomotives and carriages
- Constructed: 1956 - converted 1958
- Number built: 1 set (2 cars)
- Number preserved: 1 set (2 cars)
- Formation: DMBS-DTC
- Capacity: 12 first 105 second (initially 31 + 86)
- Operator: British Railways

Specifications
- Car body construction: Steel
- Car length: 57 ft 6 in (17.53 m)
- Doors: 2 on each side
- Maximum speed: 60 miles per hour (97 km/h)
- Weight: DMBS: 37 long tons 10 cwt (84,000 lb or 38.1 t); DTC: 32 long tons 10 cwt (72,800 lb or 33 t)
- Prime mover: 2 x 100 kilowatts (130 hp) nose-suspended motors
- Power supply: Chloride Batteries Ltd
- Electric system: 216 lead-acid cells, 440 V, 1070 A·hr
- Track gauge: 4 ft 8 1/2 in (1,435 mm)

The British Rail BEMU was an experimental two-car battery electric multiple unit (BEMU), converted from the prototype Derby Lightweight Diesel multiple units. The train was powered by many lead-acid batteries, and was used on the Deeside Railway from Aberdeen to Ballater in Scotland from April 1958 until it was finally withdrawn in December 1966. The North of Scotland Hydro-Electric Board initiated the design and was a joint sponsor. The board promised to supply power at three farthings per unit for a fixed two-year period. It provided an 11kV supply to a charger at Aberdeen's platform 1 and a 6.6kV supply to a charger at Ballater.

== Career ==
The estimated cost of the fit-out was £50,000, with the two coaches accounting for almost half of that. Because each set of batteries weighed about eight tons, the underframe of the carriages needed strengthening, at a budgeted cost of £2,000. Motors, conduits and cabling were costed at £5,000.

Power was provided from two Siemens-Schuckert compensated motors each rated at 100 kW which were nose suspended onto motor bogie. The control equipment is similar to that employed on the German battery railcars and was supplied by Siemens-Schuckert (Great Britain), Limited. It consists of apparatus manufactured by Siemens-Schuckert and Schaltbau in Germany. Control is effected by series-parallel arrangements with three positions of field weakening and with facilities for cutting out either motor. The battery consisted of 216 lead-acid Chloride Batteries rated at 440V 1,070 Ampere Hour.

The unit was equipped with a new type of battery in the early 1960s, but subsequently suffered a series of small fires in the battery areas and was withdrawn from service. It returned to use for a period before closure of the line in 1966.

== Departmental use and preservation ==
The train then spent a short time in storage at Inverurie Works, and at Hyndland Shed in Glasgow, before being transferred to departmental use as test train "Gemini" (or "Laboratory 16") for use at the Railway Technical Centre, at Derby. It lasted in this role until it was withdrawn in 1984, and was eventually bought for preservation at the proposed West Yorkshire Transport Museum, where it was returned to working order. The museum placed it on loan to the East Lancashire Railway in 1994 where, after asbestos was removed and the batteries refurbished, it was used on some services until 2000. After the museum went into liquidation, the unit was purchased by the Royal Deeside Railway near Crathes, in 2001. It is now back in Scotland, where it is undergoing refurbishment.

Details are as follows:

Vehicle Nos.		Location	Comments	Departmental Nos.	
DMBS	DTC	Location	Comments	DMBS	DTC
79998	79999	Royal Deeside Railway	Used as test train "Gemini" (Lab 16).	975003	975004
