= Milton of Crathes railway station =

Preserved railway station in Scotland

Milton of Crathes
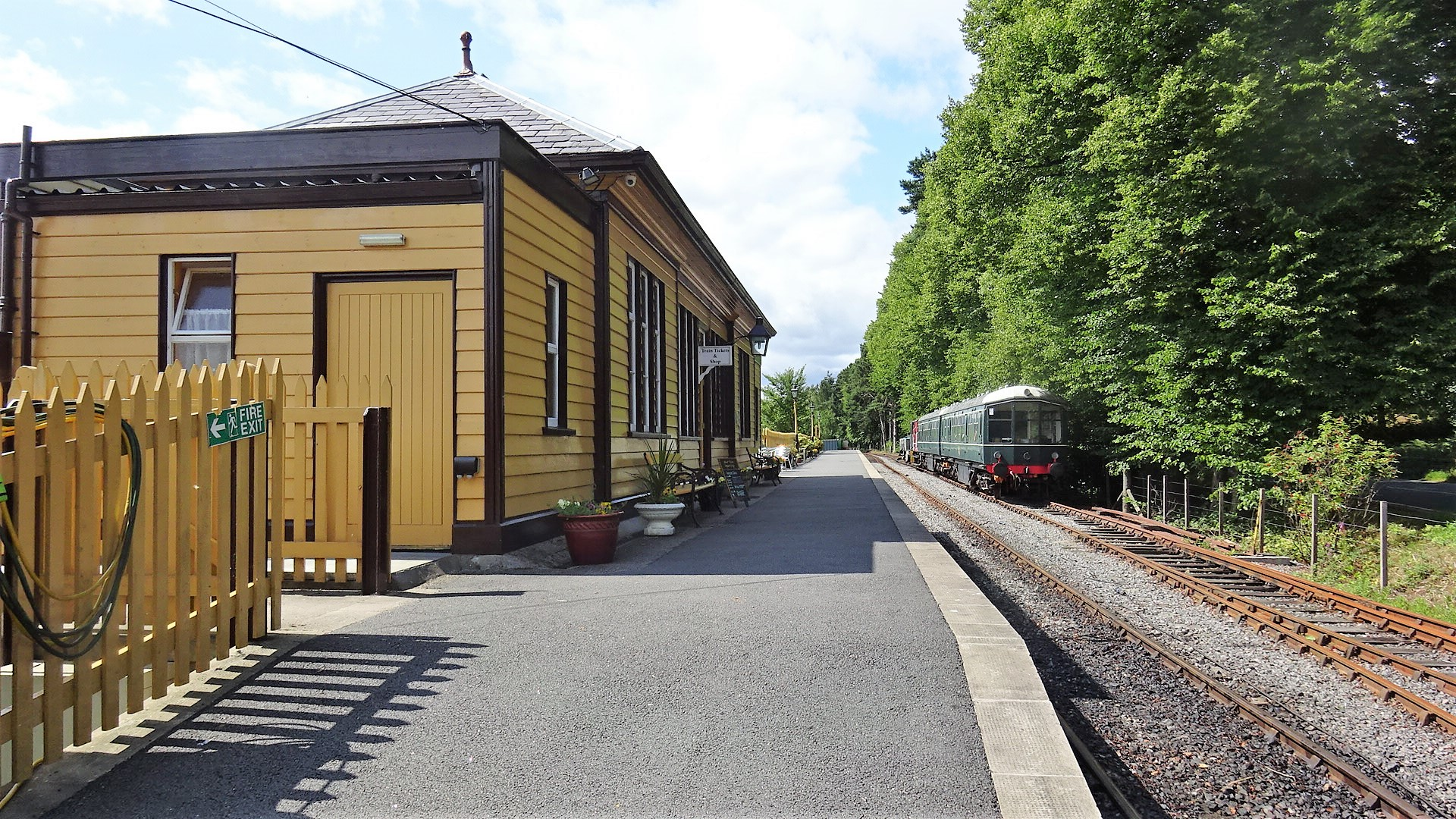

General information
- Location: Banchory, Royal Deeside, Aberdeenshire; Scotland
- Coordinates: 57.0563°N 2.4297°W
- Grid reference: NO747963
- System: Station on heritage railway
- Manager: Royal Deeside Railway Preservation Society
- Platforms: 1

Key dates
- 28 February 1966: Line Closed by British Railways
- 2003: First track laid on site by Royal Deeside Railway
- 2006: Construction of station platform begins
- 14 April 2007: Official opening
- 2012: Re-erection of Oldmeldrum station building begins
Location

Milton of Crathes railway station is located at Milton of Crathes, three miles east of Banchory, Royal Deeside, Aberdeenshire, Scotland, United Kingdom.

== Crathes (Castle) Station ==
Crathes Castle station, located 1/4 mile (400 m) to the east of Milton of Crathes (57.0575°N 2.4163°W), was opened by the original Deeside Railway in 1853 for the private use of the Laird of Crathes. In 1863 Crathes Castle was renamed Crathes and became a public railway station, a role it retained until the closure of the railway line in 1966 due to the famous Beeching cuts. The Crathes station building and replica of the original signal box were placed on the market during 2021 and sold to new owners.

== Milton of Crathes Station ==
Milton of Crathes station is the headquarters of the Royal Deeside Railway Preservation Society (RDRPS). The station is currently the first station of the rebuilt Royal Deeside Railway which will eventually run for over two miles west into the town of Banchory. The station itself consists of a single platform and two tracks (which form a locomotive run-round loop and headshunts). The station was officially opened on 14 April 2007 by Aberdeenshire Provost Raymond Bisset.

At the east end of the station, the former Oldmeldrum station building has been re-erected and restored by the volunteers of the RDRPS. The station building itself now houses a museum with memorabilia and a ticket office which is also run by a set of volunteers.

The station also has numerous parking spaces available and picnic spots next to the main line.

Currently all passenger services always start here and are operated using a selection of rolling stock including British Rail Class 03 diesel shunters, three British Rail Mark 2 coaches in BR Crimson and Cream livery and the carriages which form the British Rail BEMU "Gemini" Battery Railcar. Various items of rolling stock are either stored at the station or elsewhere along the railway line.

Milton of Crathes is also home to the former Aberdeen Gas Works steam locomotive: 0-4-0 "Bon Accord", which completed her 10-year overhaul in 2019 and is currently used to operate the steam service.

Attractions: Crathes Castle (opposite), various heritage rolling stock items.

| Preceding station | Heritage railways | Following station |
|---|---|---|
| Riverside Halt Terminus | Royal Deeside Railway | Terminus |
Historical railways
| Banchory; Line mostly closed, partially open as a heritage line. Station closed | Great North of Scotland Railway; Deeside Railway | Mills of Drum; Line and station closed |
