= Royal Deeside Railway =

Heritage railway line in Scotland

Coordinates: 57.0564°N 2.4292°W

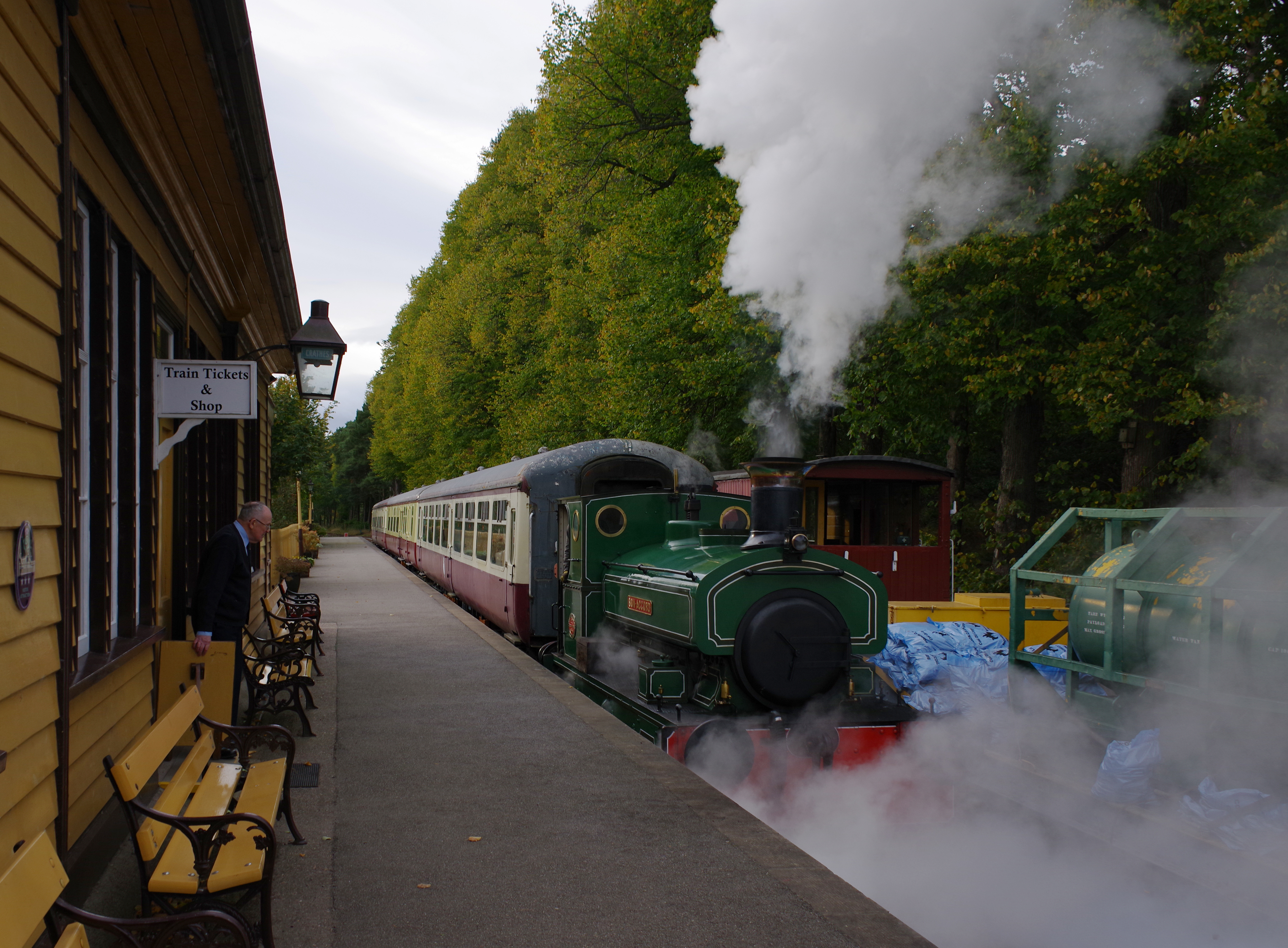
A train hauled by locomotive Bon Accord at Milton of Crathes

The Royal Deeside Railway is a heritage railway located at Milton of Crathes railway station on a part of the original Deeside Railway, in Scotland, United Kingdom.

== Original railway ==
Originally constructed between 1853 and 1866, the Deeside Railway ran between Ballater railway station and Aberdeen Ferryhill railway station. The line was regularly used by the Royal Family and other important people visiting Balmoral Castle. The line closed in stages between 1966 and 1967.

The line was one of those closed by the Beeching Report.

== Preservation history ==
The Royal Deeside Railway Preservation Society was formed in 1996 with the intention of restoring the section of the Deeside Railway which ran between Banchory and Milton of Crathes. The society began restoration work in 2003. The society operated a one-mile section of track starting in 2007. The first steam-hauled passenger service operated in 2010. In 2020, the railway opened a new station at Birkenbaud lay-by.

After a platform was built at Milton of Crathes railway station, a station building was donated from the closed Oldmeldrum Railway and moved to Milton of Crathes, where it serves as the Royal Deeside Railway Preservation Society headquarters. Most of the track the railway owns is old track from Guild Street yard next to Aberdeen station. While some of the wooden and concrete sleepers are no longer safe to use, solutions are being explored to see if the concrete sleepers can be repaired and reused.

In 2020, the railway experienced financial trouble due to the COVID-19 pandemic in the United Kingdom.

== Current operations ==
The railway currently operates a passenger service over 1 mile of track from Milton of Crathes to Birkenbaud Crossing. All services call and terminate at Milton of Crathes with each journey taking 15–20 minutes for a return trip. Milton of Crathes station consists of a single platform and two tracks (which form a locomotive run-round loop and headshunts), a small shop, museum and a ticket office. A car park is available with disabled access.

The railway owns the original British Rail BEMU which was converted from a diesel engine to battery power and operated on the Deeside Railway from 1958 to 1966. The BEMU currently requires a complete electrical overhaul, but it is sometimes used as a passenger coach, offering an alternative to the Mark 2 coaches.

This rail services are operated using rolling stock including former Aberdeen Gas Works Steam Engine "Bon Accord" and British Rail Class 03 diesel shunters that haul three British Rail Mark 2 passenger coaches in BR Crimson and Cream livery, with a fourth coach currently being restored.

== Future ==
The railway will soon extend to a new station, Riverside Halt. This station will allow passengers to disembark the train and walk the mile back to the Milton of Crathes or continue further along the Deeside Way towards Banchory. This new station will form the end of the running line, creating a passenger service between the Milton of Crathes and Riverside Halt via Birkenbaud Crossing. A new loop line is under construction at Riverside Halt, along with two new buffer end siding spaces. These new siding spaces will hold rolling stock which is currently not in use.

In 2020, it was announced that the group intends to extend the operating segment to Banchory railway station by using former track bed which is currently part of the Deeside Way.

A major challenge for future plans for the railway's extension towards Banchory was the original 19th-century railway bridge known as the Bridge of Bennie which now carries the Deeside Way cycle and footpath after closure of the old line. The Deeside Railway wished to reuse the original railway bridge, however in order to do so, the Bridge of Bennie required strengthening for new railway traffic to cross. By using the original Bridge of Bennie, a new purpose built bridge would be required in order to continue the Deeside Way. The new Deeside Way bridge was lifted into place on 15 December 2020, but delays due to COVID 19 restrictions and other difficulties have meant the new bridge remains closed to the public. This means that the Deeside way continues to use the Bridge of Bennie, meaning railway operations cannot be extended. It has been estimated that the extension to Banchory will cost approximately £250,000 once ongoing work is complete.

== Locomotives ==
- Steam locomotives
  - Andrew Barclay 0-4-0ST No. 807 "Bon Accord". Operational (Ex Aberdeen Gas Works).
  - Andrew Barclay 0-6-0ST No. 2139 "Salmon". Boiler ticket expired 1 January 2019, a contract overhaul is being arranged.
- Diesel locomotives
  - BR 0-6-0 Class 03 no. D2037 / 03037. Stored Unserviceable.
  - BR 0-6-0 Class 03 no. D2094 / 03094. Operational.
  - BR 0-6-0 Class 03 no. D2134 / 03134. Operational.
- Multiple units
  - BR BEMU unit 79998+79999. Operational (as hauled coaching stock)

== See also ==
- Milton of Crathes railway station
