= Dess railway station =

Railway station in Aberdeenshire, Scotland

Dess
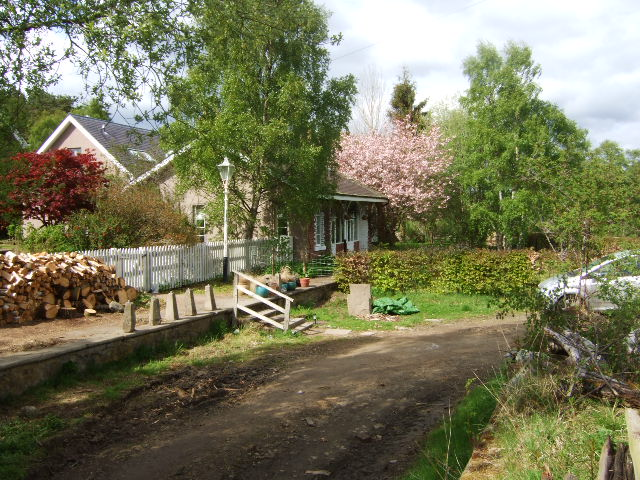
- Dess Station in 2008

General information
- Location: Dinnet, Aberdeenshire; Scotland
- Coordinates: 57.0949°N 2.7205°W
- Grid reference: NJ564006
- Platforms: 1

Other information
- Status: Disused

History
- Original company: Aboyne and Braemar Railway
- Pre-grouping: Great North of Scotland Railway
- Post-grouping: LNER

Key dates
- 2 December 1859: Station opened
- 5 June 1964: Freight services ceased
- 28 February 1966: Station closed to passengers
- 18 July 1966: Line closed entirely
Location

Dess railway station was opened on 2 December 1859 on the Deeside Railway Extension and served the rural area around Dess House and estate from 1859 to 1966 as an intermediate station on the Deeside Railway that ran from Aberdeen (Joint) to Ballater.

== History ==
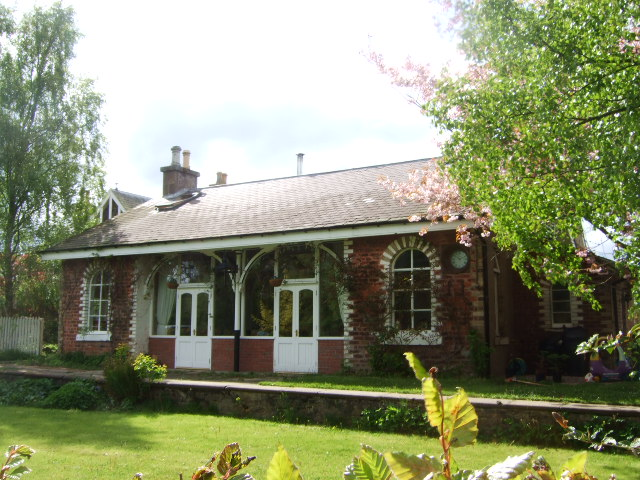
Dess station house in 2008

The station was opened in 1859 on the Deeside branch of the Deeside Railway Extension and from the start its services were operated by the Deeside Railway. Later it became part of the GNoSR and at grouping merged with the London and North Eastern Railway. It stood 29.5 miles (47.5 km) from Aberdeen and 13.75 miles (22 km) from Ballater. It was closed to passengers on 28 February 1966. The line has been lifted and sections form part of the Deeside Way long-distance footpath. The station was unstaffed from circa 1964, if not earlier, when goods services were withdrawn from the line.

== Infrastructure ==
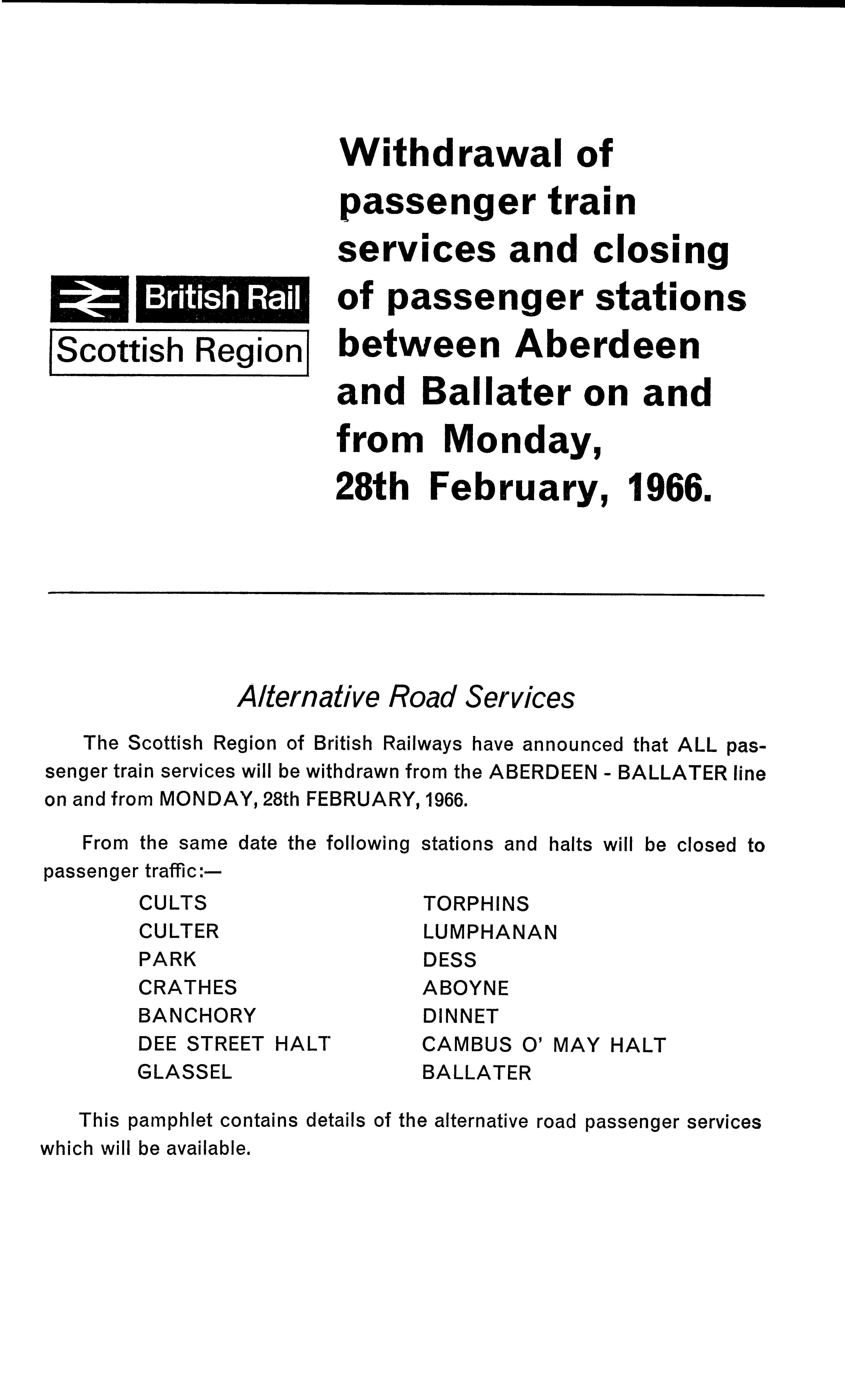
The 1966 BRB Closure notice.

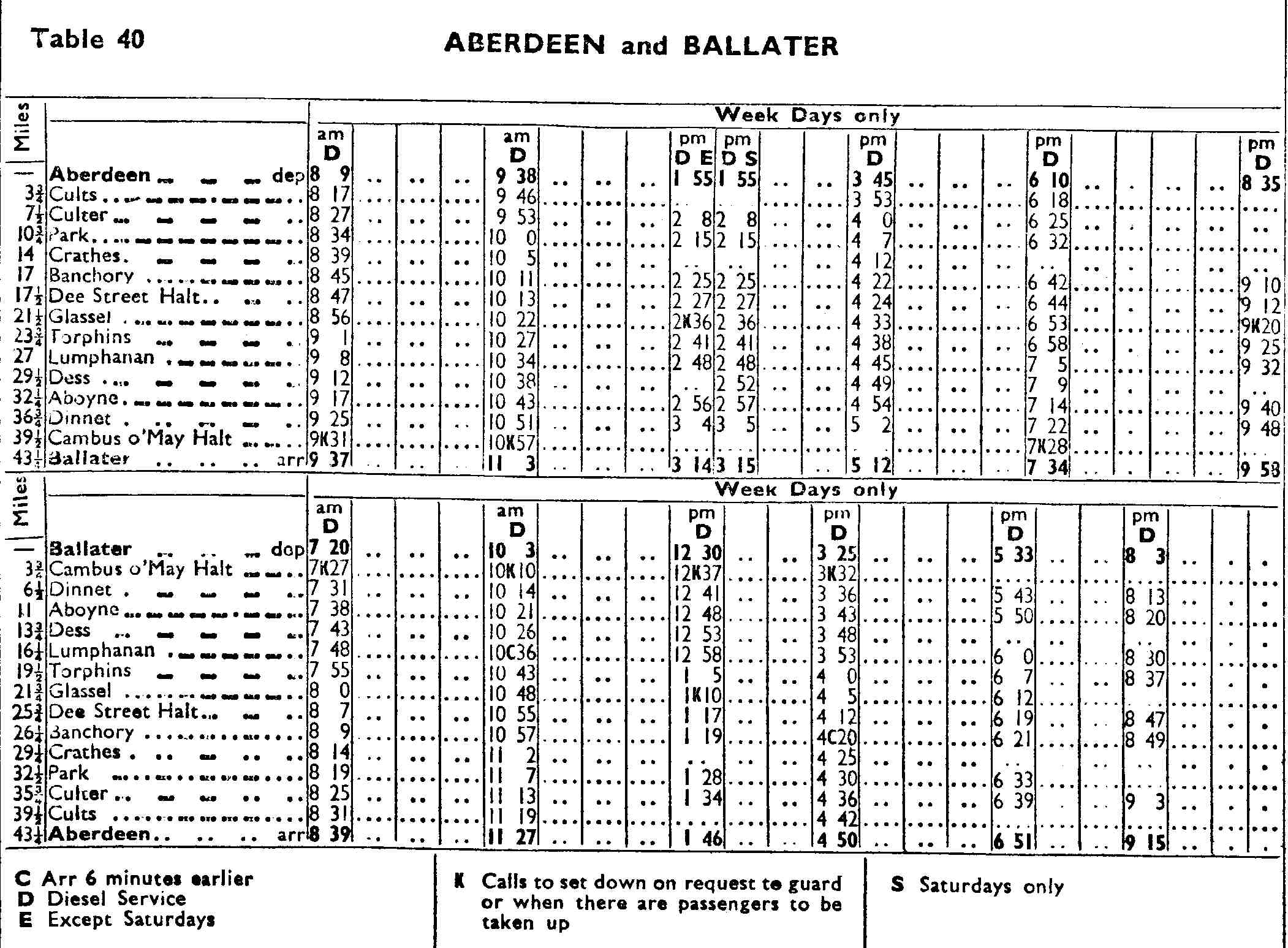
The 1963 timetable.

The station had a single stone built platform on this single track section of the branch. The stationmaster's house, ticket office and waiting room were situated on the up side of the line, consisting of a rough-cast and brick built single-storey structure, with round-headed windows at the front and a central covered area. It was similar in design to those at Lumphanan, Glassel, etc. The single freight siding was lifted prior to the cessation of freight services on the line in 1964.

In 1900 a railway agent's house, not built until after 1867, stood to the west of the station house with access to the platform and a single siding with a loading ramp and weighing machine was located opposite the platform with the goods yard accessed off the nearby road.

== Services ==
The line was chosen to trial the battery multiple unit and once introduced on 21 April 1958 the train service was doubled to six trains a day and in addition a Sunday service was reinstated. Dess, unlike Cambus O'May was not a request stop, however not all services were timetabled to call at this remotely located station.

== The site today ==
The much enlarged main station building and its platform survive as does the old railway agent's house, both as private dwellings. The Royal Deeside Railway is located at Milton of Crathes some distance down the line towards Aberdeen.

== Aboyne Curling Pond Station ==
Aboyne Curling Pond railway station, also known as Loch of Aboyne Platform or Curlers' Platform was a nearby private station opened on the Deeside Railway Extension for the use of the curlers who played on the nearby Loch of Aboyne

== Sources ==
- Butt, R. V. J. (October 1995). The Directory of Railway Stations: details every public and private passenger station, halt, platform and stopping place, past and present (1st ed.). Sparkford: Patrick Stephens Ltd. ISBN 978-1-85260-508-7. OCLC 60251199. OL 11956311M.
- Maxtone, Graham and Cooper, Mike (2018). Then and Now on the Great North. V.1. GNoSR Association. ISBN 978-0902343-30-6.

Preceding station	Historical railways	Following station
Lumphanan; Line and station closed	Great North of Scotland Railway; Deeside Railway	Aboyne; Line and station closed
