= Lumphanan railway station =

Former railway station in Scotland

Lumphanan
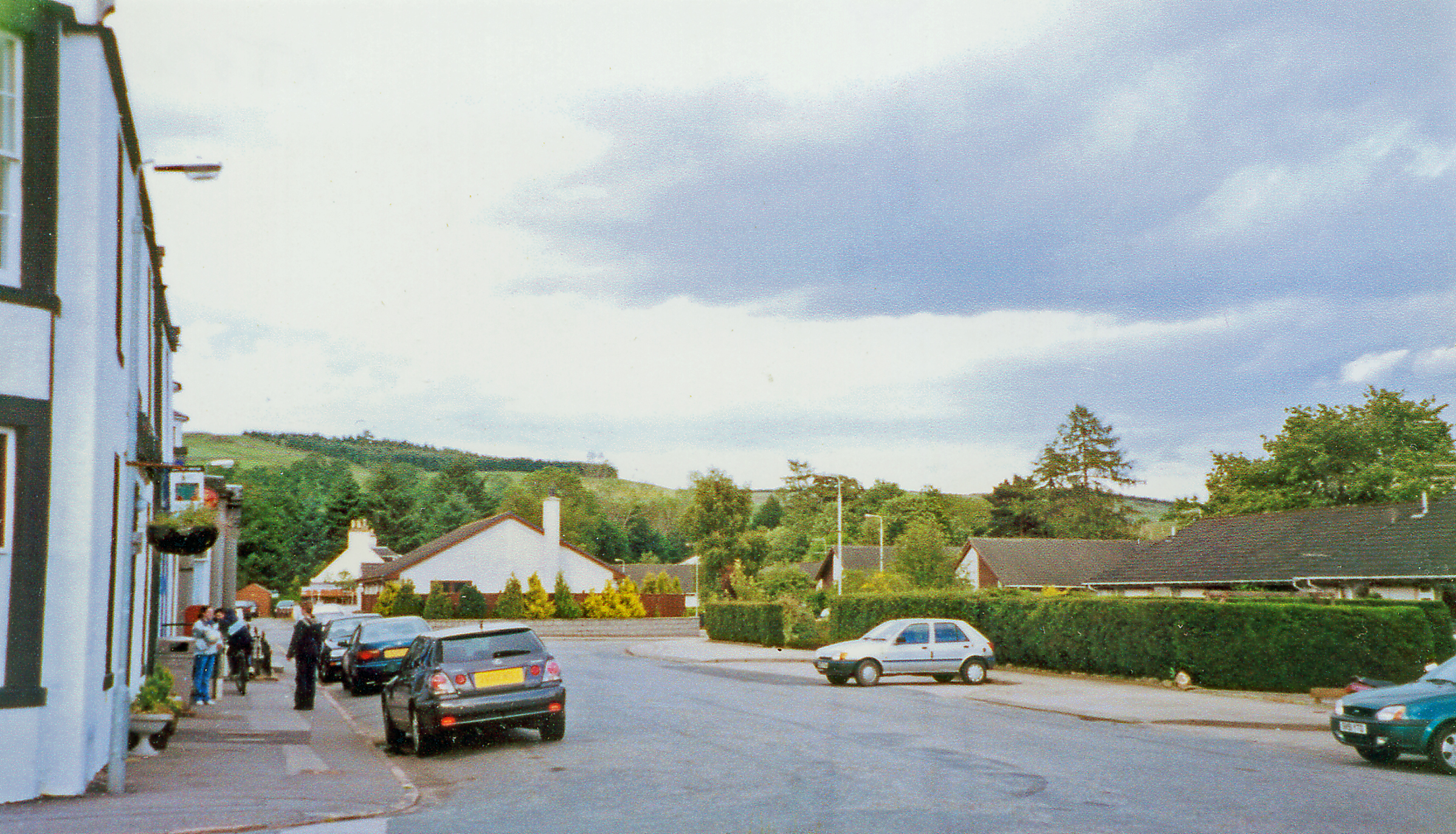
- Site of the old station in Lumphanan

General information
- Location: Lumphanan, Aberdeenshire; Scotland
- Coordinates: 57.1279°N 2.6871°W
- Grid reference: NJ585043
- Platforms: 2

Other information
- Status: Disused

History
- Original company: Deeside Railway Extension
- Pre-grouping: Great North of Scotland Railway
- Post-grouping: LNER

Key dates
- 2 December 1859: Station opened
- 28 February 1966: Station closed to passengers
- 18 July 1966: Line closed to all traffic
Location

Lumphanan railway station, Lumphanan, Aberdeenshire, Scotland stood from 1859 to 1966 on the Deeside Railway that ran from Aberdeen (Joint) to Ballater. It served the village of Lumphanan, Aberdeenshire, famous for its associations with Macbeth and King Malcolm III. It stood close to the Macbeth Arms Hotel.

== History ==
The station was opened in 1859 on the Deeside Railway Extension by the Deeside Railway. Later it became part of the Great North of Scotland Railway and at grouping merged with the London and North Eastern Railway. It stood 27 miles (43.5 km) from Aberdeen and 16 miles (25.5 km) from Ballater. It was closed to passengers on 28 February 1966. The line has been lifted and sections form part of the Deeside Way long-distance footpath.

The name Lumphanan comes from the Gaelic and means 'Church of St Finnan'.

== Infrastructure ==
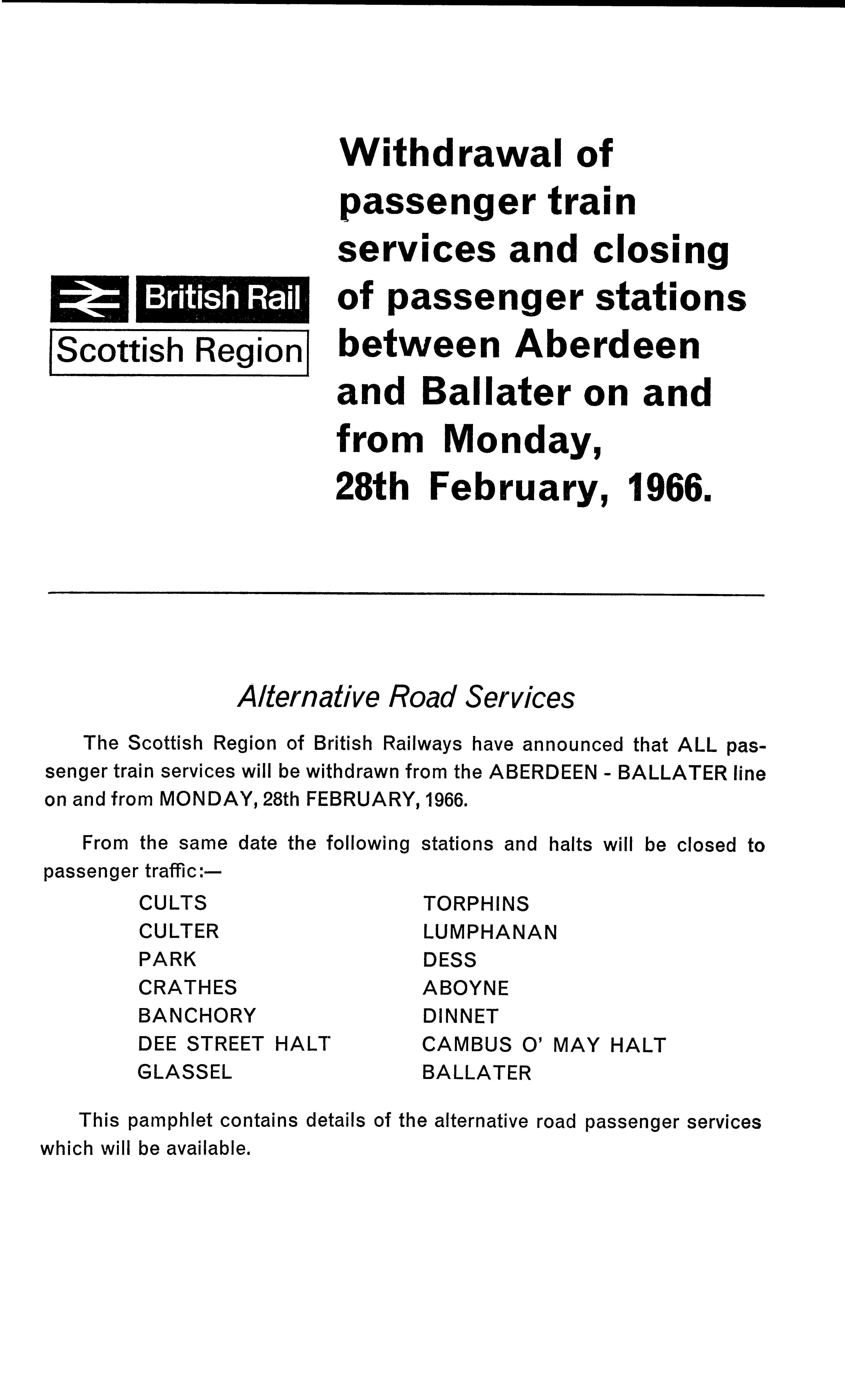
The 1966 BRB Closure notice.

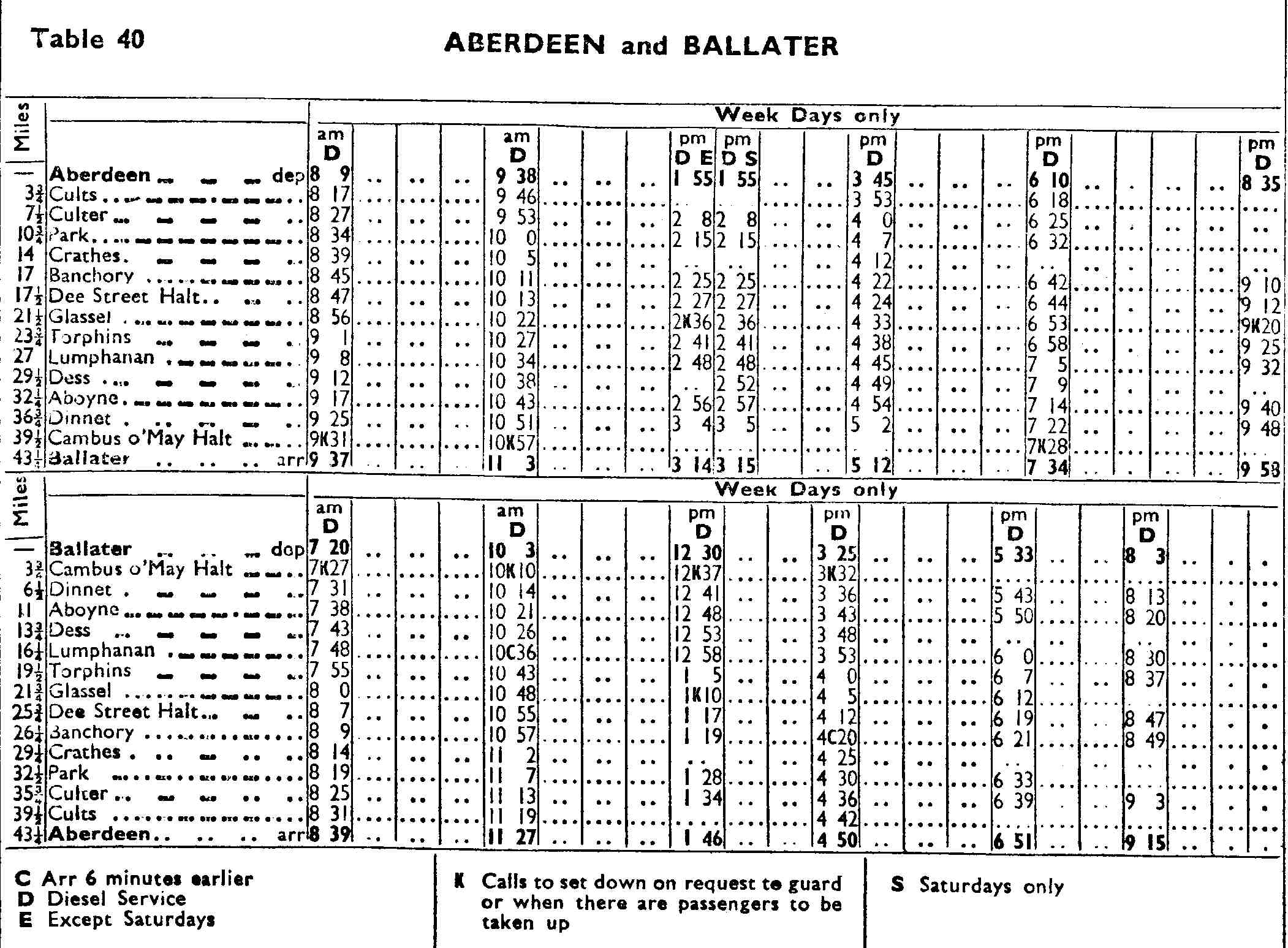
The 1963 timetable.

The station had a passing loop installed in 1892 and then two stone built platforms standing on a slightly curved section of this single track portion of the branchline. The ticket office, toilets and waiting room were situated on the up platform, consisting of a rough-cast and brick built single-storey structure, with round-headed windows at the front and a central covered area. The shelter on the down platform was a typical GNoSR design with wooden slatted sides and at the eastern end of this platform stood the signal box. A pedestrian footbridge linked the platforms and a road overbridge stood at the western end of the station.

A large stone built goods shed was provided, served by a siding that also served a loading dock; another siding ran parallel to it and a final siding ran behind the down platform. Several small storage huts sat near the goods shed. A weighing machine was located near the road entrance.

A short siding off the passing loop on the eastbound side was built as a precaution against waggons that might break loose from freight trains struggling up the steep ascent to Satan's Den Cutting. After a train had left the point was switched to ensure the safety of trains heading up from Aboyne.

Two station houses for the station master, etc. were built to the south of the goods yard.

== Services ==
The line was chosen to trial the battery multiple unit and once introduced on 21 April 1958 the train service was doubled to six trains a day and in addition a Sunday service was reinstated.

== The site today ==
The platform and station buildings have been demolished however the name 'Station Square' survives. The Royal Deeside Railway is located at Milton of Crathes some distance down the line towards Aberdeen. The two station houses are still present.

Preceding station	Historical railways	Following station
Torphins; Line and station closed	Great North of Scotland Railway; Deeside Railway	Dess; Line and station closed

== Sources ==
- Butt, R. V. J. (October 1995). The Directory of Railway Stations: details every public and private passenger station, halt, platform and stopping place, past and present (1st ed.). Sparkford: Patrick Stephens Ltd. ISBN 978-1-85260-508-7. OCLC 60251199. OL 11956311M.
- Johnston, James B. (1934). Place-Names of Scotland. London : John Murray.
- Maxtone, Graham and Cooper, Mike (2018). Then and Now on the Great North. V.1. GNoSR Association. ISBN 978-0902343-30-6.
