= Torphins railway station =

Former railway station in Scotland

Torphins
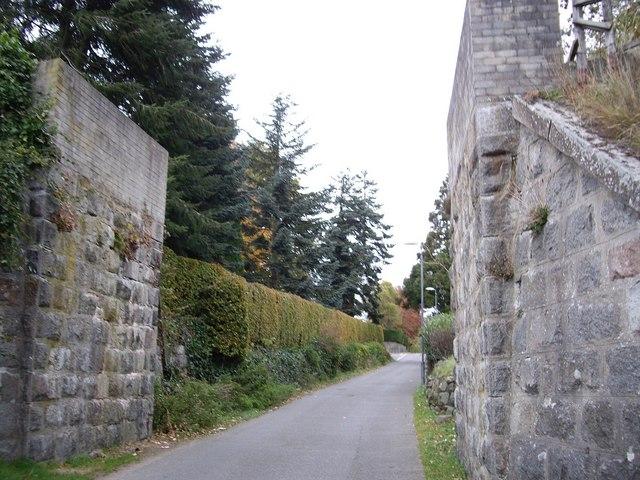
- Old railway bridge abutments in Torphins

General information
- Location: Torphins, Aberdeenshire; Scotland
- Coordinates: 57.1059°N 2.6210°W
- Grid reference: NJ624018
- Platforms: 2

Other information
- Status: Disused

History
- Original company: Deeside Railway Extension
- Pre-grouping: Great North of Scotland Railway
- Post-grouping: LNER

Key dates
- 2 December 1859: Station opened
- 28 February 1966: Station closed to passengers
- 18 July 1966: Line closed entirely
Location

Torphins railway station served the village of Torphins from 1859 to 1966 on the Deeside Railway that ran from Aberdeen (Joint) to Ballater.

== History ==
The station was opened in 1859 on the Deeside Railway Extension by the Deeside Railway. Later it became part of the Great North of Scotland Railway and at grouping merged with the London and North Eastern Railway. It stood 23.75 miles (38 km) from Aberdeen and 19.5 miles (31 km) from Ballater. It was closed to passengers on 28 February 1966. The line has been lifted and sections form part of the Deeside Way long-distance footpath.

== Infrastructure ==
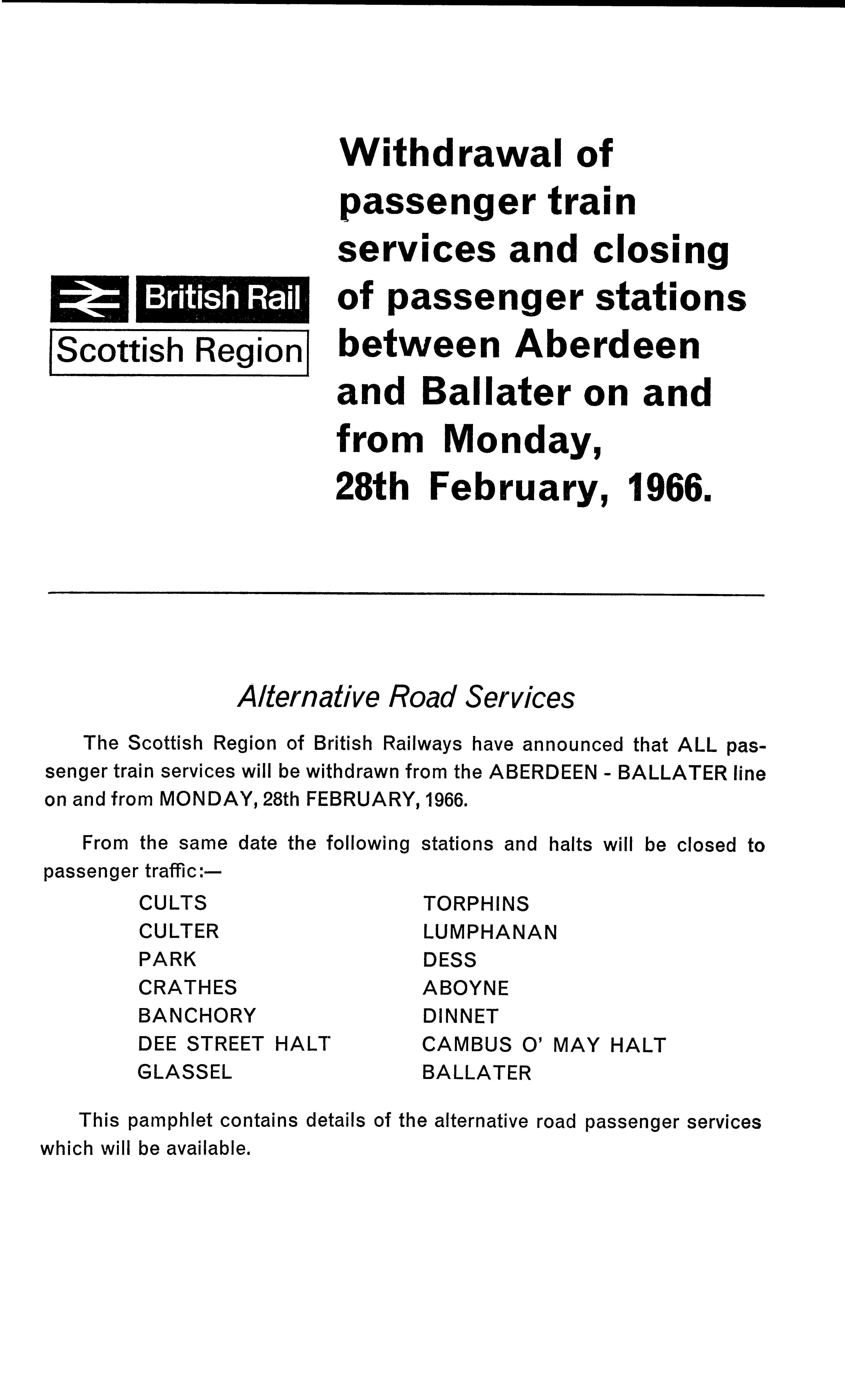
The 1966 BRB Closure notice.

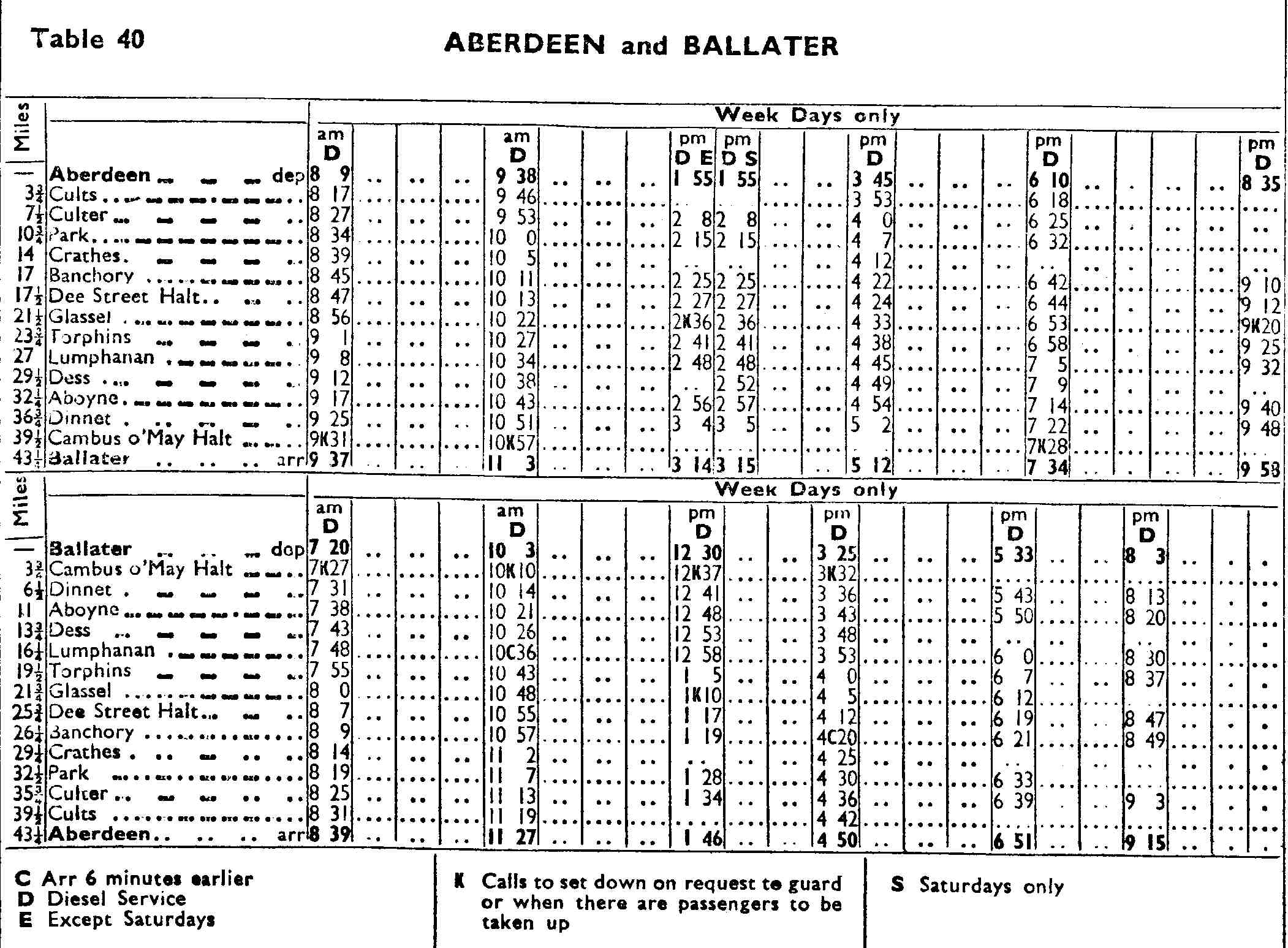
The 1963 timetable.

The station was of a very unusual design with a passing loop lying to the west of the original single platformed station and platform as shown on the 1866 OS map. At this date an overbridge divided the station from the passing loop and provided direct access to the nearby Learney Arms Hotel. A small goods station was present with a loading dock served by the only siding. Two buildings stood within the goods yard that was accessed from near the aforementioned hotel. No signal box is marked.

The 1899 OS map shows considerable change with the old overbridge removed and a new one built to the west at Bridge Street with a signal box next to it and a short siding beyond. The passing loop was extended to run through the now two platformed station and a new expanded goods yard with a goods shed built. Several sidings, storage sheds and a crane are marked. The old loading dock site became the new platform. A pedestrian overbridge is shown at the east end of the down platform, a second signal box beyond and a short siding slightly further on.

The ticket office, toilets and waiting room were situated on the up platform, very similar to other stations on the route such as Lumphanan, consisting of a rough-cast and brick built single-storey structure, with round-headed windows at the front and a central covered area. The shelter on the down platform was a typical GNoSR design with wooden slatted sides. A building that may have been the station master's house stood just to the east of the main station building. The station was host to a LNER camping coach in 1937 and 1938.

== Services ==
The line was chosen to trial the battery multiple unit and once introduced on 21 April 1958 the train service was doubled to six trains a day and in addition a Sunday service was reinstated.

== The site today ==
The platform and station buildings have been demolished however the name 'Station Road' survives as does Bridge Street Bridge. The Royal Deeside Railway is located at Milton of Crathes some distance down the line towards Aberdeen.

== Sources ==
- Butt, R. V. J. (October 1995). The Directory of Railway Stations: details every public and private passenger station, halt, platform and stopping place, past and present (1st ed.). Sparkford: Patrick Stephens Ltd. ISBN 978-1-85260-508-7. OCLC 60251199. OL 11956311M.
- Johnston, James B. (1934). Place-Names of Scotland. London : John Murray.
- Maxtone, Graham and Cooper, Mike (2018). Then and Now on the Great North. V.1. GNoSR Association. ISBN 978-0902343-30-6.
- McRae, Andrew (1997). British Railway Camping Coach Holidays: The 1930s & British Railways (London Midland Region). Vol. Scenes from the Past: 30 (Part One). Foxline. ISBN 1-870119-48-7.

Preceding station	Historical railways	Following station
Glassel; Line and station closed	Great North of Scotland Railway; Deeside Railway	Lumphanan; Line and station closed
