= Dinnet railway station =

Former railway station in Scotland

Dinnet
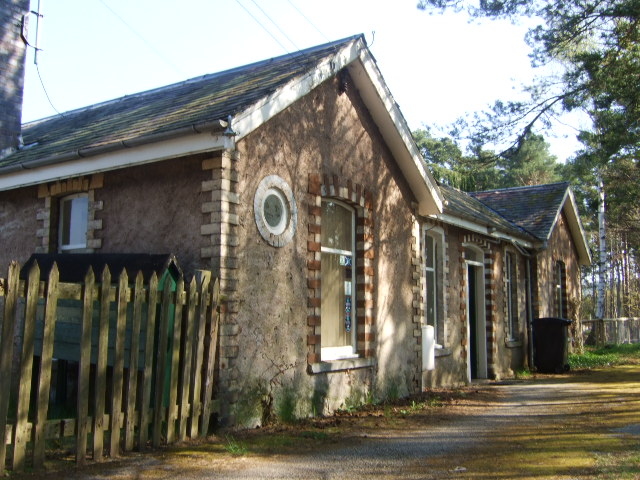
- The old station building in 2008

General information
- Location: Dinnet, Aberdeenshire; Scotland
- Coordinates: 57.0766°N 2.8924°W
- Grid reference: NO460987
- Platforms: 2

Other information
- Status: Disused

History
- Original company: Aboyne and Braemar Railway
- Pre-grouping: Great North of Scotland Railway
- Post-grouping: LNER

Key dates
- 17 October 1866: Opened
- 5 June 1964: Freight services ceased
- 28 February 1966: Closed to passengers
Location

Dinnet railway station was opened on 17 October 1866 by the Aboyne and Braemar Railway and served Dinnet village from 1899 to 1966 as an intermediate station on the Deeside Railway that ran from Aberdeen (Joint) to Ballater. Dinnet is located close to the River Dee in the parish of Glenmuick, Tullich And Glengairn, Aberdeenshire, Scotland.

== History ==
The station was opened in 1866 on the Deeside branch by the Aboyne and Braemar Railway that never extended beyond Ballater and from the start its services were operated by the Deeside Railway. Later it became part of the GNoSR and at grouping merged with the London and North Eastern Railway. It stood 36.75 miles (59 km) from Aberdeen and 6.5 miles (10.5 km) from Ballater. The station was unstaffed from circa 1964 when goods services were withdrawn and the station was closed to passengers on 28 February 1966. The line has been lifted and sections form part of the Deeside Way long-distance footpath.

== Infrastructure ==
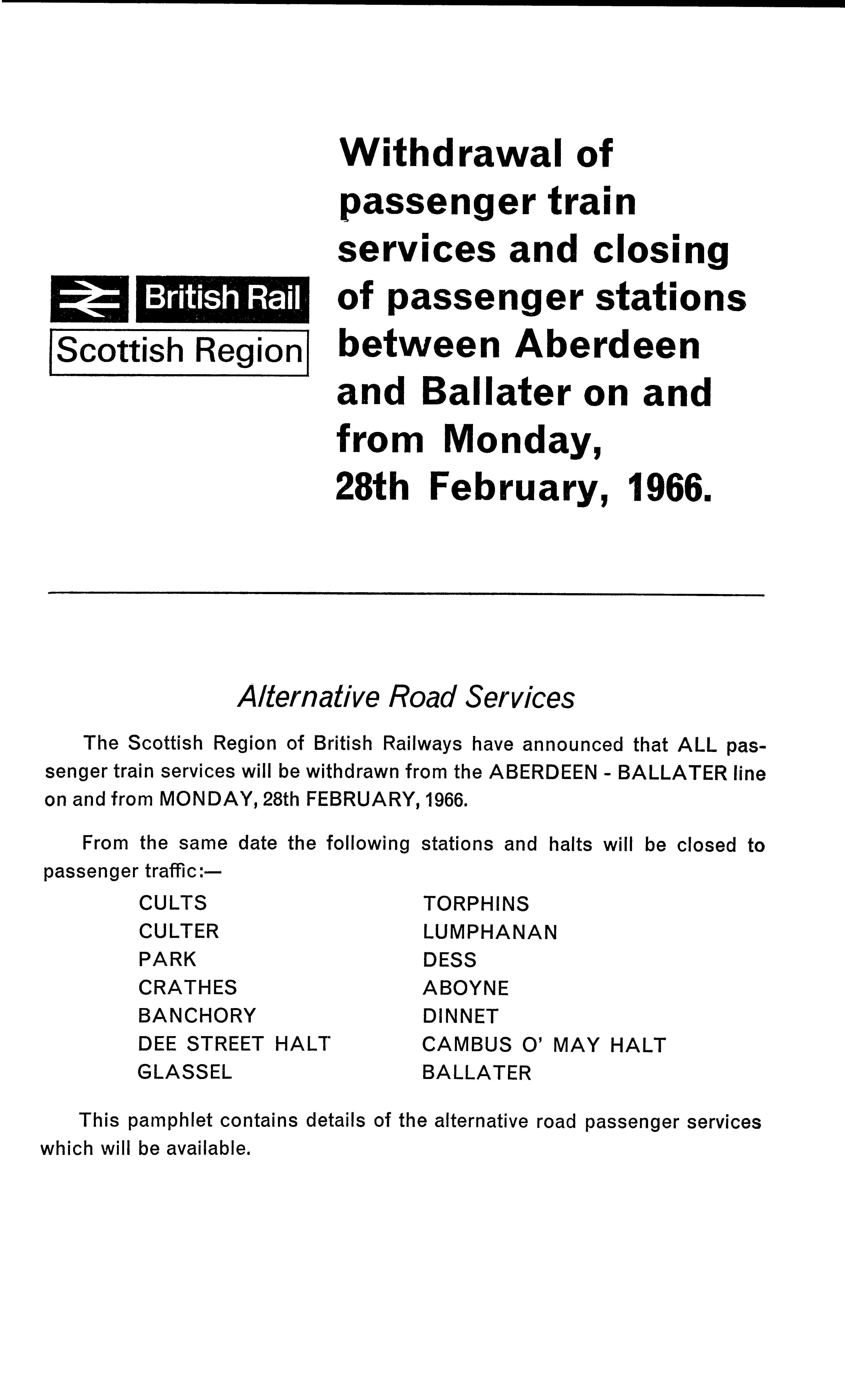
The 1966 BRB Closure notice.

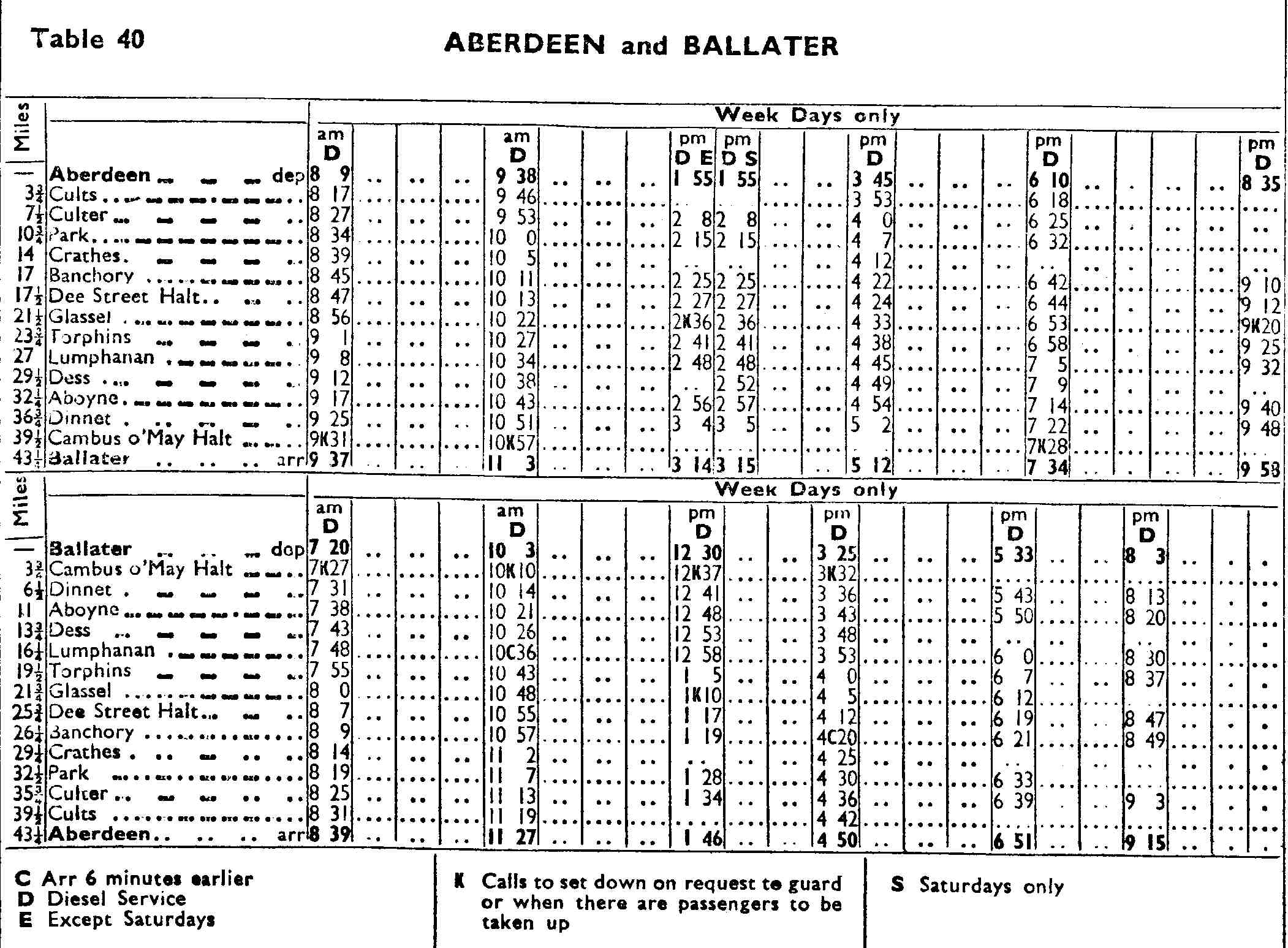
The 1963 timetable.

The station originally only had a single short platform and a public house stood nearby. A small station building was present and the goods yard existed in the same location as later maps show it following the expansion of the station's facilities with the building of a new road and the establishment of a level crossing, signal boxes, and passing loop. The village of Dinnet did not exist at the time and the station was named after the Dinnet Estate.

The waiting room and ticket office consisting of a rough-cast and brick built single-storey structure, a station clock built into the front wall and a central covered area. The station master's house stood just to the east of the main station building. A pedestrian overbridge stood near the station building and a small shelter stood on the second platform. A second signal box stood on the platform to the east overlooking the passing loop and a siding.

The level crossing and gates stood just to the west of the stone built platform on a straight section of track with the signal box close by and a small goods yard with a small head shunt and a loading bay with a crane. Timber was often loaded here and a link with the Monadavan Diatomite Works via a narrow gauge railway may have existed up until circa 1919. The freight sidings were lifted following the cessation of freight services in 1964.

== Monandavan Diatomite Works ==
These works from 1876 quarried diatomite or Diatomaceous earth deposited beneath the peat that was refined to produce Kieselguhr, an essential component of Dynamite. A narrow gauge railway existed within the works and this may have extended to the station. The diatomite was transported to the Nobel Explosives plant at Ardeer in North Ayrshire until 1919.

== Services ==
The line was chosen to trial the battery multiple unit and once introduced on 21 April 1958 the train service was doubled to six trains a day and in addition a Sunday service was reinstated. Dinnet, unlike Cambus O'May was not a request stop.

== The site today ==
The modified and enlarged main station building survives as office accommodation for the local Dinnet and Kinnord Estate and the platforms remain with the trackbed in use as part of the Deeside Way. The station master's house is a private dwelling. The Royal Deeside Railway is located at Milton of Crathes some distance down the line towards Aberdeen.

== Sources ==
- Butt, R. V. J. (October 1995). The Directory of Railway Stations: details every public and private passenger station, halt, platform and stopping place, past and present (1st ed.). Sparkford: Patrick Stephens Ltd. ISBN 978-1-85260-508-7. OCLC 60251199. OL 11956311M.
- Maxtone, Graham and Cooper, Mike (2018). Then and Now on the Great North. V.1. GNoSR Association. ISBN 978-0902343-30-6.

Preceding station	Disused railways	Following station
Aboyne; Line and station closed	Deeside Railway	Cambus O'May; Line and station closed
