= Aboyne Curling Pond railway station =

Former railway station in Aberdeenshire, Scotland

Aboyne Curling Pond
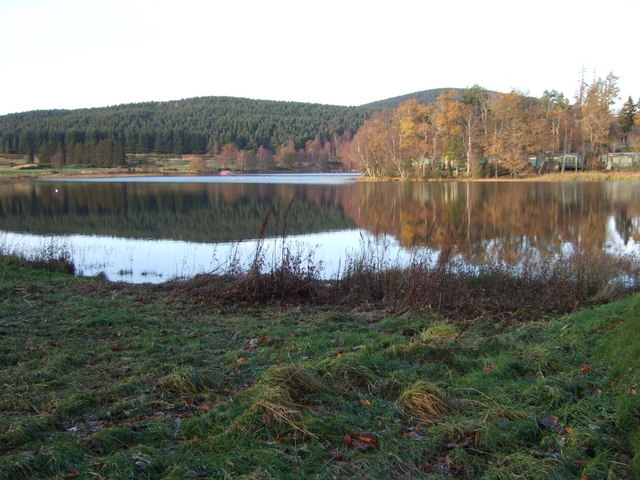
- The Loch of Aboyne from the station site

General information
- Location: Aboyne, Aberdeenshire; Scotland
- Coordinates: 57.0838°N 2.7654°W
- Grid reference: NO537994
- Platforms: 1

Other information
- Status: Disused

History
- Original company: Great North of Scotland Railway
- Pre-grouping: Great North of Scotland Railway
- Post-grouping: LNER

Key dates
- 1891: Station open
- 1925: station closed to passengers
- 18 July 1966: Line closed entirely
Location

Aboyne Curling Pond railway station, Loch of Aboyne Platform or Curlers' Platform was a private station opened on the Deeside Railway Extension for the use of the curlers, who played on the nearby Loch of Aboyne close to the old Deeside Railway that ran from Aberdeen (Joint) to Ballater.

== History ==
The station was opened by 1891 on the Deeside Railway, that had been part of the GNoSR since 1879 and at grouping merged with the London and North Eastern Railway. It was closed to curlers prior to 1925. The line itself has been lifted and this section forms part of the Deeside Way long-distance footpath.

Aboyne was not unique in having a dedicated private curlers' railway station as at least one other existed at Loch Parks, named Drummuir Curlers' Platform on the Keith and Dufftown Railway. Loch Leven station was frequently used for curling matches.

=== Aboyne Curling Club ===
The loch is artificial, created by the Aboyne Castle estate. On 9 February 1891 he Aberdeen Free Press advertised a special train from Aberdeen along the Deeside line to the Loch of Aboyne Platform for a bonspiel on the 10 February between curlers from the south and north of the River Don. In 1908 the club is recorded as meeting annually at the Loch of Aboyne and that the loch was used for curling from at least 1870. The club was active in 1915, the year when it is recorded to have organised a concert to raise money for the war effort. The club no longer exists. The site was also known as St Katherine's Loch.

== Infrastructure ==
The 1899 OS map shows the single short station platform that was located on the northern or loch side of this single track section of the branch not far from Rosepark Cottage. The platform was made of railway timbers as was the substantial revetment behind. A path led to the eastern end of the platform and a pedestrian crossing was present that also gave direct access to the loch. No indication of the halt is indicated on OS maps in 1929.

== Services ==
Apart from advertised events the station was not listed on timetables and the sport had a very seasonal and unpredictable requirement for train services.

== The site today ==
The foundations of the platform survive. The Royal Deeside Railway is located at Milton of Crathes some distance down the line towards Aberdeen.

== See also ==
- Carsbreck railway station
- Drummuir Curlers' Platform railway station

== Sources ==
- Butt, R. V. J. (October 1995). The Directory of Railway Stations: details every public and private passenger station, halt, platform and stopping place, past and present (1st ed.). Sparkford: Patrick Stephens Ltd. ISBN 978-1-85260-508-7. OCLC 60251199. OL 11956311M.
- Maxtone, Graham and Cooper, Mike (2018). Then and Now on the Great North. V.1. GNoSR Association. ISBN 978-0902343-30-6.

| Preceding station | Historical railways | Following station |
|---|---|---|
| Dess; Line and station closed | Deeside Railway | Aboyne; Line and station closed |
