= Cambus O'May railway station =

Disused railway station in Scotland

Cambus O'May
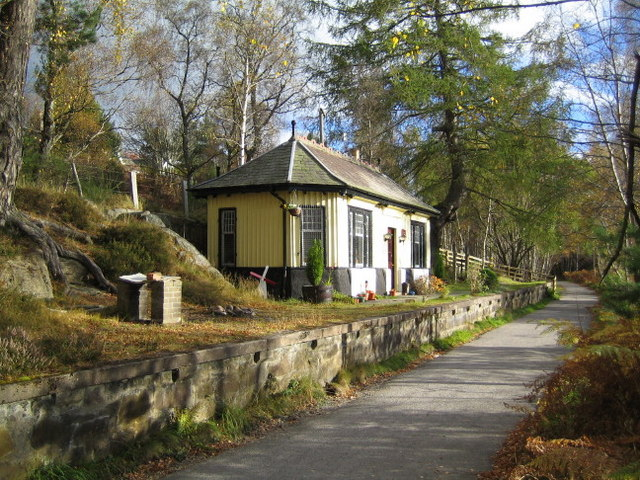
- The remains of the station in 2007

General information
- Location: Dinnet, Aberdeenshire; Scotland
- Coordinates: 57.0642°N 2.9542°W
- Grid reference: NO422974
- Platforms: 1

Other information
- Status: Disused

History
- Original company: Aboyne and Braemar Railway
- Pre-grouping: Deeside Railway; Great North of Scotland Railway
- Post-grouping: LNER

Key dates
- 1876: Station opened
- 1956: The station became unstaffed
- 28 February 1966: Station closed to passengers
Location

Cambus O'May railway station or Cambus O'May Halt, served Aberdeenshire, Scotland from 1876 to 1966 on the Deeside Railway. It was intended to serve the anglers on the River Dee, tourists, the 1874 Cambus O'May House hunting lodge and the local population of this rural district and stood 39 3/8 miles (63.4 km) from the Aberdeen (Joint) station. It was the last stop before Ballater.

== History ==
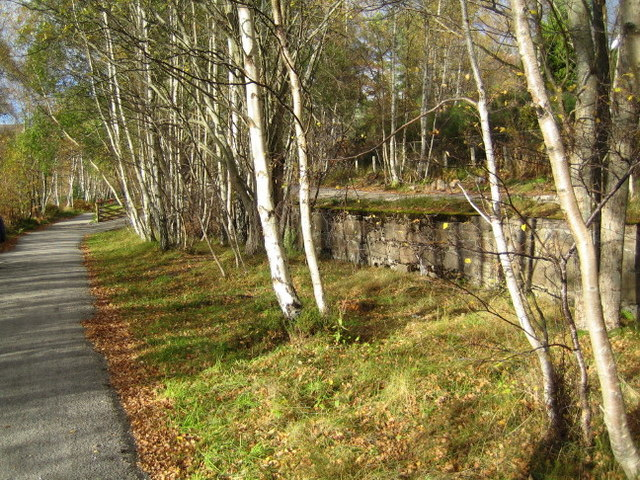
Loading dock to the east of the station site.

The station was opened as a basic halt in 1876 on the Deeside Railway by the Aboyne and Braemar Railway, the station building with its waiting room and ticket office was added at a later date. Closure to passengers took place on 28 February 1966 at which time the station was once again designated a halt.

Gunpowder was delivered by train for use at the nearby quarry at Tomnakiesk where pink granite was worked and used as ballast, reached by a siding to the east of the station.

The Great North of Scotland Railway directors held their weekend board meetings in the company directors saloon that was shunted into a siding for that purpose. In 1923 the line became part of the London and North Eastern Railway and in 1948 part of British Railways. Passenger services were withdrawn on 28 February 1966 and the line was closed completely to Ballater on 18 July 1966.

The body of a GNoSR carriage stood close to the station for many years. The siding at the old loading dock was the site of a LNER camping coach from 1935 to 1939 and possibly one for some of 1934 until it was moved to Aboyne after 1948. This loading dock had been opened by the Aboyne and Braemar Railway prior to the station in conjunction with the ballast quarry but was also used to handle cattle and timber traffic.

In 1928 the stationmaster was Alexander Roy, followed by his wife Maggie Roy who remained in charge until the station became unstaffed in 1956, sometime after which it became a request stop and some trains did not call at all.

One corner of the gable end of what was once the Ferry Inn was cut away to make to provide sufficient clearance for the railway track.

The name Cambus O'May comes from the Gaelic and means 'Crook in the Plain' referring to the tight bend in the River Dee near the old station.

== Infrastructure ==
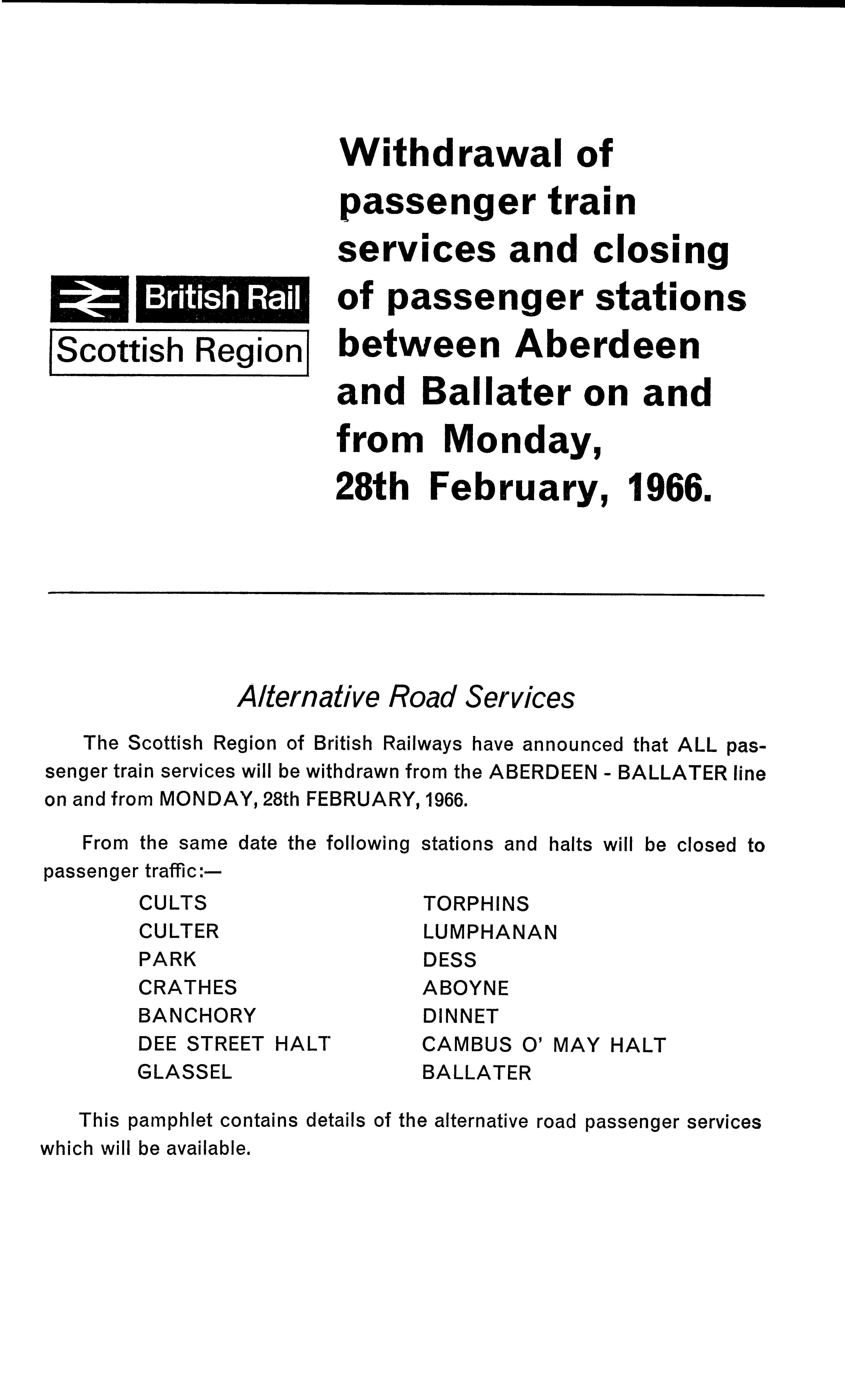
The 1966 BRB Closure notice.

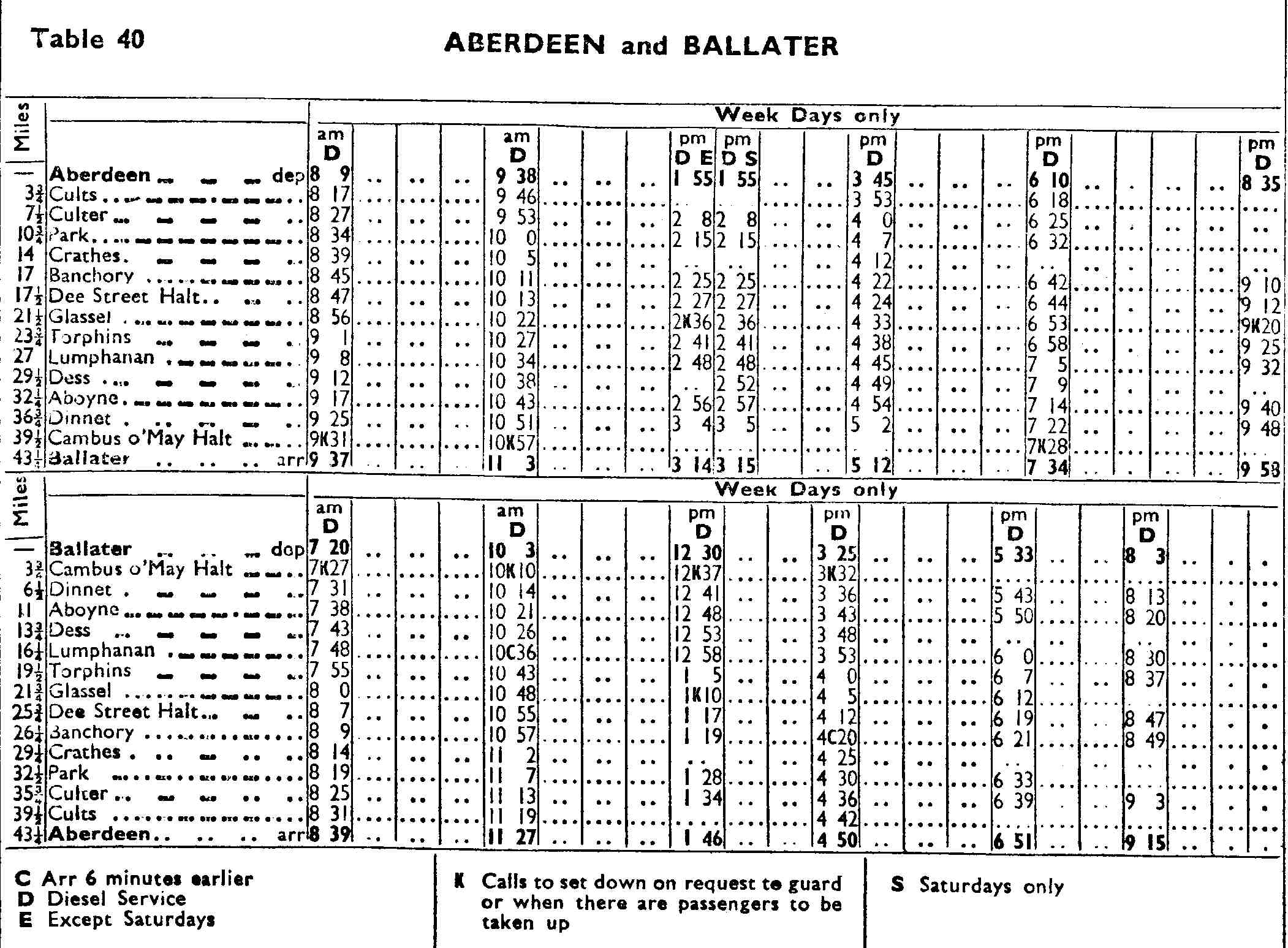
The 1963 timetable showing the 'request stop' procedures.

The station with its single stone built platform stood on a slightly curved section of this single track line. In 1900 no signal box or signal posts were recorded on the OS map, a group of buildings stood at the station site and the siding serving the loading dock ran into a bay at the platform. A weighing machine was present and the stationmaster's house stood between the station and the road. The station was built with a timber slat exterior and was embellished with angled ends and ornate roof apex tiles as retained to this day (datum 2019).

The Gordon Suspension Bridge over the River Dee stands to the west of the old station and the A93. It was built in 1905 to replace the old ferry service that gave passengers access to the railway station, once reflected in the name of the old Ferry Inn now named 'Cutaway Cottage'.

== The site today ==
The platform and station building remain as a private dwelling as does the nearby Station Cottage. The trackbed is part of the Deeside Way and the Royal Deeside Railway is located at Milton of Crathes some distance down the line towards Aberdeen.

== Sources ==
- Butt, R. V. J. (October 1995). The Directory of Railway Stations: details every public and private passenger station, halt, platform and stopping place, past and present (1st ed.). Sparkford: Patrick Stephens Ltd. ISBN 978-1-85260-508-7. OCLC 60251199. OL 11956311M.
- Johnston, James B. (1934). Place-Names of Scotland. London : John Murray.
- Maxtone, Graham and Cooper, Mike (2018). Then and Now on the Great North. V.1. GNoSR Association. ISBN 978-0902343-30-6.

Preceding station	Historical railways	Following station
Dinnet; Line and station closed	Deeside Railway	Ballater; Line and station closed
