= Aboyne railway station =

Former railway station in Aberdeenshire, Scotland

Coordinates: 57.07601°N 2.77663°W

Aboyne
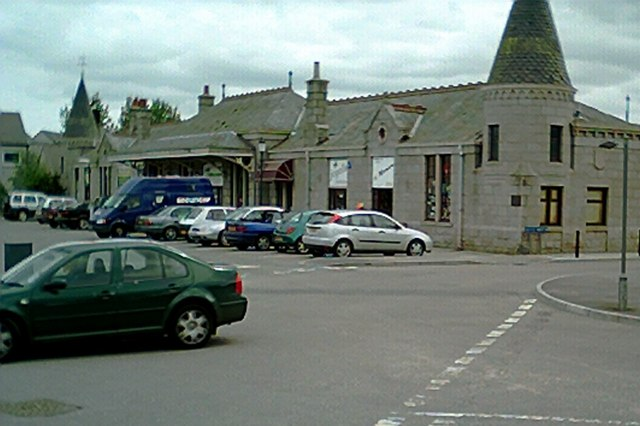
- The station building in 2003

General information
- Location: Aberdeenshire; Scotland
- Platforms: 2

Other information
- Status: Disused

History
- Opened: 2 December 1859
- Closed: 28 February 1966
- Original company: Deeside Railway
- Pre-grouping: Great North of Scotland Railway
- Post-grouping: LNER
Location

Aboyne railway station was a station which served Aboyne in the Scottish county of Aberdeenshire. It was served by trains on the line from Aberdeen to Ballater.

== History ==
The Deeside Railway had originally intended to build its railway to Aboyne but it was reincorporated in 1852 with powers only to build as far as Banchory. Following the passing of the Deeside Railway Extension Act 1857 (28 & 29 Vict. c. cclxxix) the company gained powers to continue the line to Aboyne where it opened the station on 2 December 1859 as its terminus. The line was extended to Ballater by a second company, Aboyne and Braemar Railway, which opened on 17 October 1866 when the station ceased to be a terminus.

Later to be leased and then part of the Great North of Scotland Railway, the station became part of the London and North Eastern Railway during the Grouping of 1923, passing on to the Scottish Region of British Railways during the nationalisation of 1948. It was then closed by the British Railways Board on 28 February 1966.

The station was host to a LNER camping coach from 1937 to 1939. A coach was also positioned here by Scottish Region of British Railways from 1954 to 1960.

Aboyne Curling Pond railway station, also known as Loch of Aboyne Platform or Curlers' Platform, was a nearby private station opened on the Deeside Railway Extension for the use of the curlers, who played on the nearby Loch of Aboyne.

The station closed for passengers on 28 February 1966 and for goods on 18 July 1966.

Preceding station	Historical railways	Following station
Dess	Great North of Scotland Railway; Deeside Railway	connection to Aboyne and Braemar Railway
connection to Deeside Railway Extension	Great North of Scotland Railway; Aboyne and Braemar Railway	Dinnet

== The site today ==
The line is now part of the Deeside Way footpath, while the station is home to a range of shops. The single-storey granite station building, completed in 1896, has been a Category C listed building since March 2000.
