= Dinnet =

Coordinates: 57.077°N 2.893°W

Dinnet: Scottish Gaelic: Dùnaidh
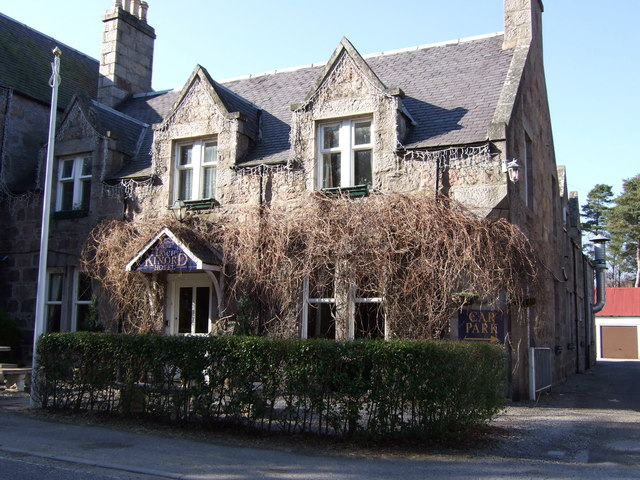
- The Loch Kinord Hotel at Dinnet

- Location within Aberdeenshire
- OS grid reference: NO460985
- Council area: Aberdeenshire
- Lieutenancy area: Aberdeenshire
- Country: Scotland
- Sovereign state: United Kingdom
- Post town: ABOYNE
- Postcode district: AB34
- Police: Scotland
- Fire: Scottish
- Ambulance: Scottish
- UK Parliament: West Aberdeenshire and Kincardine
- Scottish Parliament: Aberdeenshire West

Dinnet (Scottish Gaelic, Dùnaidh) is a village in the Marr area of Aberdeenshire, Scotland. Approximately equidistant from Deeside towns Aboyne and Ballater and situated on the main A93 road in the valley of the River Dee, it is said to be the gateway to both the Highlands (despite the fact that it is well within the boundaries of present-day Aberdeenshire) and the Cairngorms National Park. It is the first village along the Dee to be located inside the park.

Nearby are Dinnet Oakwood, Loch Kinord, Loch Davan and Burn O'Vat.

== Name ==
Alan James states that Dinnet may be compared with several Brittonic toponyms named with the element *dïnn, "sharp point", with the nominal suffix -ed (cf. Dent).

A fishing map claims that the village got its name one summer after a fishing trip in the early 19th century.

== History ==
Muir of Dinnet is featured extensively in artist Chris Dooks' short film Six Striped Rustic which was commissioned by Banchory's Woodend Barn Arts as part of The Year of Natural Scotland 2013.

From 1866 to 1966 Dinnet railway station on the Deeside Railway served the village and locality.
