= Lumphanan =

Village in Aberdeenshire, Scotland

Coordinates: 57.128°N 2.687°W

Lumphanan: Scottish Gaelic: Lann Fhìonain
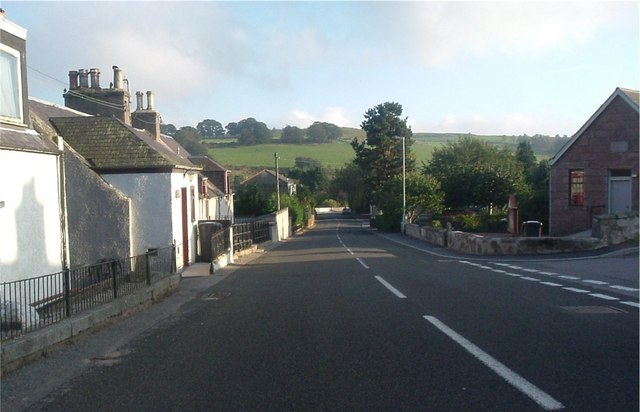
- Entering Lumphanan from the north on the A980 road

- Location within Aberdeenshire
- Population: 520 (2020)
- OS grid reference: NJ5732
- Council area: Aberdeenshire
- Country: Scotland
- Sovereign state: United Kingdom
- Post town: BANCHORY
- Postcode district: AB31
- Dialling code: 01339
- Police: Scotland
- Fire: Scottish
- Ambulance: Scottish
- UK Parliament: West Aberdeenshire and Kincardine
- Scottish Parliament: Aberdeenshire West

Lumphanan (/lʌmˈfænən/ lum-FAN-ən; Scottish Gaelic: Lann Fhìonain) is a village in Aberdeenshire, Scotland located 25 miles (40 km) from Aberdeen and 10 miles (16 km) from Banchory.

== History ==
Lumphanan is documented to be the site of the Battle of Lumphanan of 1057 AD, where Malcolm III of Scotland defeated Macbeth of Scotland. Macbeth was mortally wounded on the north side of the Mounth in 1057, after retreating with his men over the Cairnamounth Pass to take his last stand at the battle at Lumphanan. The Prophecy of Berchán has it that he was wounded at Lumphanan and died at Scone, 60 miles (100 kilometres) to the south, some days later. Mac Bethad's stepson Lulach mac Gille Coemgáin was installed as king soon after. The nearby Peel of Lumphanan was built in the early 13th century, and is a good surviving example of an earthwork castle. This site was used in the filming of the 1984 children's TV series The Box of Delights, which was based on John Masefield's fantasy novel of the same name.

The etymology of Lumphanan is identical to that of Lumphinnans in Fife, both deriving from the Gaelic for 'Church of St Finnan'.

== Amenities ==
The village has its own primary school, Lumphanan Primary, which has recently been extended, and its own pre-school, called "The Hut: Lumphanan Pre-school". There is a village corner shop, and a small tea-room.

The ruins of Corse Castle, the ancient seat of the Forbes family, stand approximately 3 miles (5 kilometres) to the north.

Along with a short, but challenging, nine-hole golf course, Lumphanan also has a recently refurbished multi sports court maintained by the Lumphanan Community Recreation Association (LCRA). Furthermore, there is a flood lit sports training area situated in the large play park, which is available for use by request. Lumphanan's summer league football team are nicknamed "The Wildcats".

The LCRA members also organise Scotland's first 10 km run of the year, known as the "Detox", that has been running since 2004 on 2 January. The race starts and finishes in Lumphanan, is mostly on road, passing through countryside. The start of the course includes a hill climb out of the village and a section of farm track running next to the old Deeside Railway Line.

== Transport ==
Lumphanan railway station stood from 1859 to 1966 on the Deeside Railway that ran from Aberdeen (Joint) to Ballater, later part of the Great North of Scotland Railway.

The village was formerly served by bus route 201 until all scheduled bus services were replaced by a council funded service starting on 21 August 2023.

== Politics ==
Lumphanan is in the Aberdeenshire Council ward of Aboyne, Upper Deeside and Donside. The three councillors for the ward are Sarah Brown (Scottish Conservative and Unionist Party), Geva Blackett(Independent) and Anouk Kloppert (SNP). It is in the Scottish Parliament Constituency of Aberdeenshire West, represented by Alexander Burnett (politician) of the Conservatives. For Scottish elections, it is represented by seven list MSPs for North East Scotland - 4 Conservatives; Peter Chapman (politician), Liam Kerr, Bill Bowman (Scottish politician) and Tom Mason (Scottish politician) 2 Scottish Labour Party - Jenny Marra and Lewis MacDonald and one Liberal Democrat - Mike Rumbles. Lumphanan is in the UK Parliament constituency of West Aberdeenshire and Kincardine, also represented by a Conservative, Andrew Bowie.
