= Victoria Barracks =

There are several places named Victoria Barracks in the world.

- Victoria Barracks, Ballater, Scotland
- Victoria Barracks, Belfast, Northern Ireland
- Victoria Barracks, Beverley, England
- Victoria Barracks, Bodmin, England
- Victoria Barracks, Brisbane, Australia
- Victoria Barracks, Hong Kong
- Victoria Barracks, Melbourne, Australia
- Victoria Barracks, Portsmouth, England
- Victoria Barracks, Sydney, Australia
- Victoria Barracks, Windsor, England
- Collins Barracks, Cork, Ireland (formerly known as Victoria Barracks)
- Custume Barracks, Athlone, Ireland (formerly known as Victoria Barracks)
