= Dinnet Oakwood =

Protected area in Aberdeenshire, Scotland

Coordinates: 57.0702°N 2.8865°W

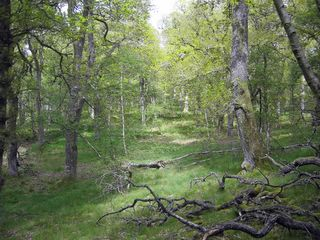
Dinnet Oakwood

Dinnet Oakwood is a Designated Special Area of Conservation located in Aberdeenshire, Scotland. It is located approximately 9 miles from Aboyne and six miles from Ballater. The area is owned by Scottish Natural Heritage.

== Land area ==
It is made up of 19.73 hectares, of which 100% is broad-leaf deciduous woodland. Dinnet Oakwood is believed to be the remains of an ancient forest which covered lowland Scotland.

== Flora and fauna ==
The flora and fauna of Dinnet Oakwood is very diverse, and includes many fish, amphibians, trees, ferns, fungi, insects, mosses, reptiles, spiders, and mammals.

Dinnet Oakwood is one of two places, along with Moronne Birkwoods, which constitutes the Eastern Highlands Atlantic Bryophyte Zone.

The fauna of Dinnet is especially important because it was protected because there are few oak woodlands located in eastern Scotland, far less so than in western Scotland, and because Dinnet Oakwood contains many groves of sessile oak. The fungi are also of note because among those located in Dinnet, there are several very rare varieties that are dependent on oak and charcoal, making it a site of national import.

Birding is common in the area, especially in the springtime.
