= Peel of Lumphanan =

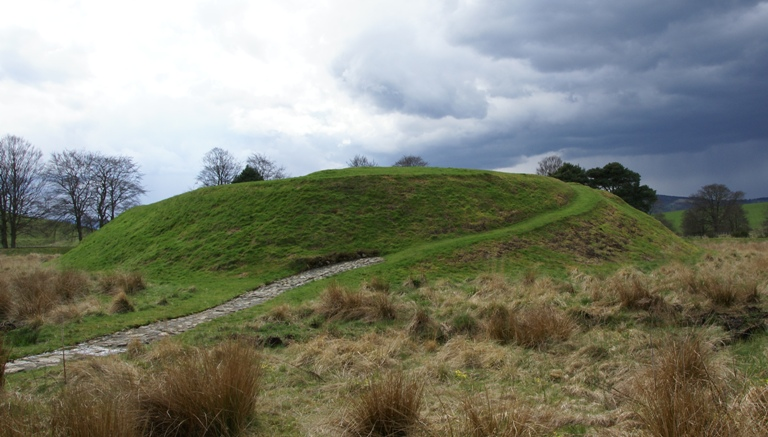
- The central mound of the Peel of Lumphanan
- Interactive map of Peel of Lumphanan
- 57°07′20″N 02°42′06″W
- Location: Aberdeenshire, Scotland; GB grid reference NJ576037

History
- Built: 13th century

Scheduled monument
- Official name: Peel Ring of Lumphanan
- Type: Secular: castle; curling pond; hall; motte
- Designated: 30 November 1998
- Reference no.: SM90238

The Peel of Lumphanan, also known as the Peel Ring or Peel Bog of Lumphanan, is a defensive structure dating back to the 13th century. It is located near Lumphanan in Aberdeenshire, north-east Scotland.

The peel comprises a mound or motte, surrounded by two concentric ditches separated by a bank. The outer earth bank is about 4 metres (13 ft) high, the inner ditch or moat is 15 metres (49 ft) across, and the central mound measures 37 by 45 metres (121 by 148 ft). The outer ditch was described as shallow in 1960, and is now difficult to discern. On the top of the mound are the remains of a 1-metre (3 ft 3 in) thick wall, and the foundations of a house measuring around 15 by 4 metres (49 by 13 ft). The entrance was probably located to the west. The lower half of the motte consists of a natural mound; it was heightened when the castle was built.

A motte on this site is thought to have been in existence at the time of the Battle of Lumphanan. This battle was fought nearby in 1057, between King Macbeth and the future King Malcolm III. Macbeth was killed, and Macbeth's Stone, upon which he is said to have been beheaded, is located 300 metres (980 ft) to the south-west.

The present mound was constructed in the 13th century by the De Lundin family, who later adopted the name Durward from their hereditary position of royal ushers or door wards. The Durwards used the peel as a lodge for hunting parties from their main local residence at Coull Castle. Sir John de Melville paid homage to Edward I of England at the peel in 1296. The original ramparts may have been of turf rather than stone. The rectangular foundation is that of Halton House, which was built in the 15th century by Thomas Charteris of Kinfauns. The circular wall, originally thought to have been the curtain wall of a shell keep, was discovered through excavation in the 1970s to be of 18th-century date.

The site is under the guardianship of Historic Scotland, and is protected as a scheduled monument. It is considered to be of national importance as "a good surviving example of an earthwork castle with water-filled outer defences."
