= Victoria Barracks, Ballater =

Barracks in Scotland, United Kingdom

Victoria Barracks
- Ballater
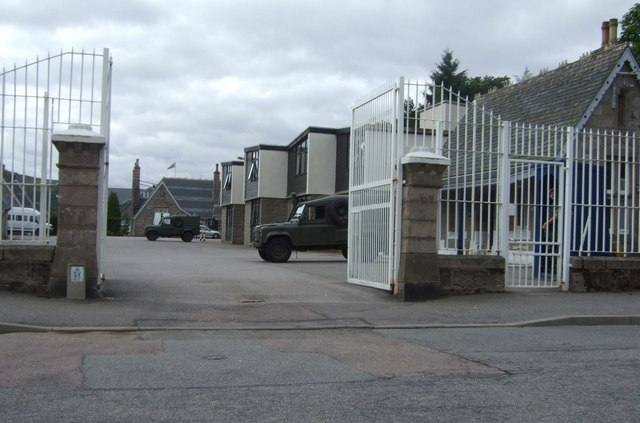
- Victoria Barracks, Ballater

Site information
- Type: Barracks
- Owner: Ministry of Defence
- Operator: British Army

Location
- Location within Aberdeenshire
- Coordinates: 57.04920°N 3.04675°W

Site history
- Built: 1850
- Built for: War Office
- In use: 1850-Present

Garrison information
- Occupants: Royal Regiment of Scotland

Victoria Barracks is a military installation in Ballater, Scotland.

== History ==
The barracks were built as temporary accommodation in 1850 to accommodate the Queen's Guard around the time that Queen Victoria and Prince Albert acquired Balmoral Castle. A row of Tudor style cottages were converted into permanent barracks in 1869 and some flat-roofed oriental-looking buildings were erected on the site in 1904. Further modernisation, including the removal of some old huts, took place in 1969. During the flooding caused by Storm Frank in late December 2015, families living in the worst affected parts of Ballater were evacuated to the barracks. When Queen Elizabeth II resided in Balmoral Castle for three months each summer, the barracks housed the Royal Regiment of Scotland's Royal Guard.
