= Maurice Abbot-Anderson =

British physician and conservationist

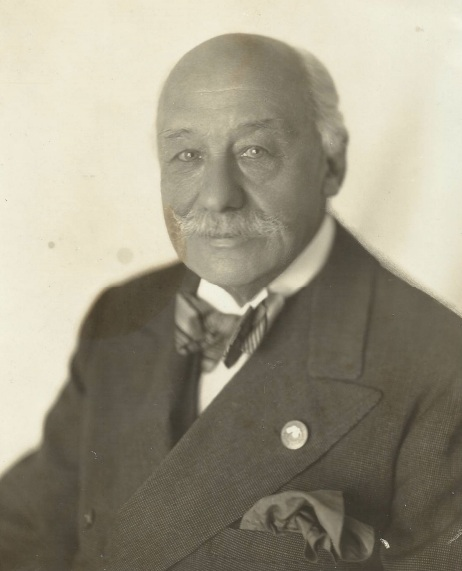
Sir Maurice Abbot-Anderson

Sir William Maurice Abbot-Anderson CVO (January 1861 – 3 May 1938) was a British physician and conservationist. He served as physician and subsequently honorary physician to Louise, Princess Royal and household.

Born in Sandgate, Kent, he studied medicine at University College London and Durham University.

He founded the Flora's League in 1925, becoming a leading figure on the Wild Plant Conservation Board of the Council for the Protection of Rural England.

He was appointed knight bachelor in 1912. He was appointed Commander of the Royal Victorian Order in 1925.
