= Loch of Aboyne =

- Aboyne loch
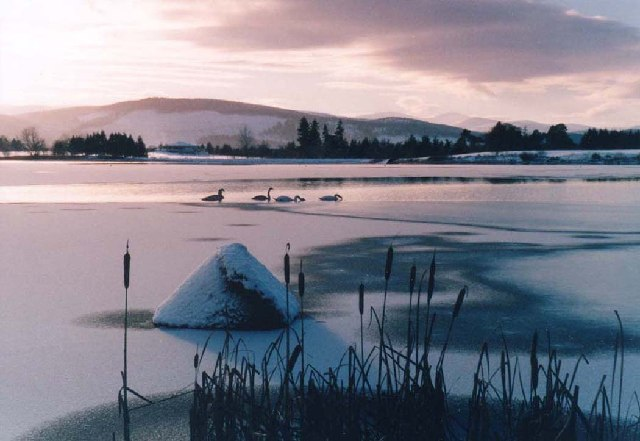

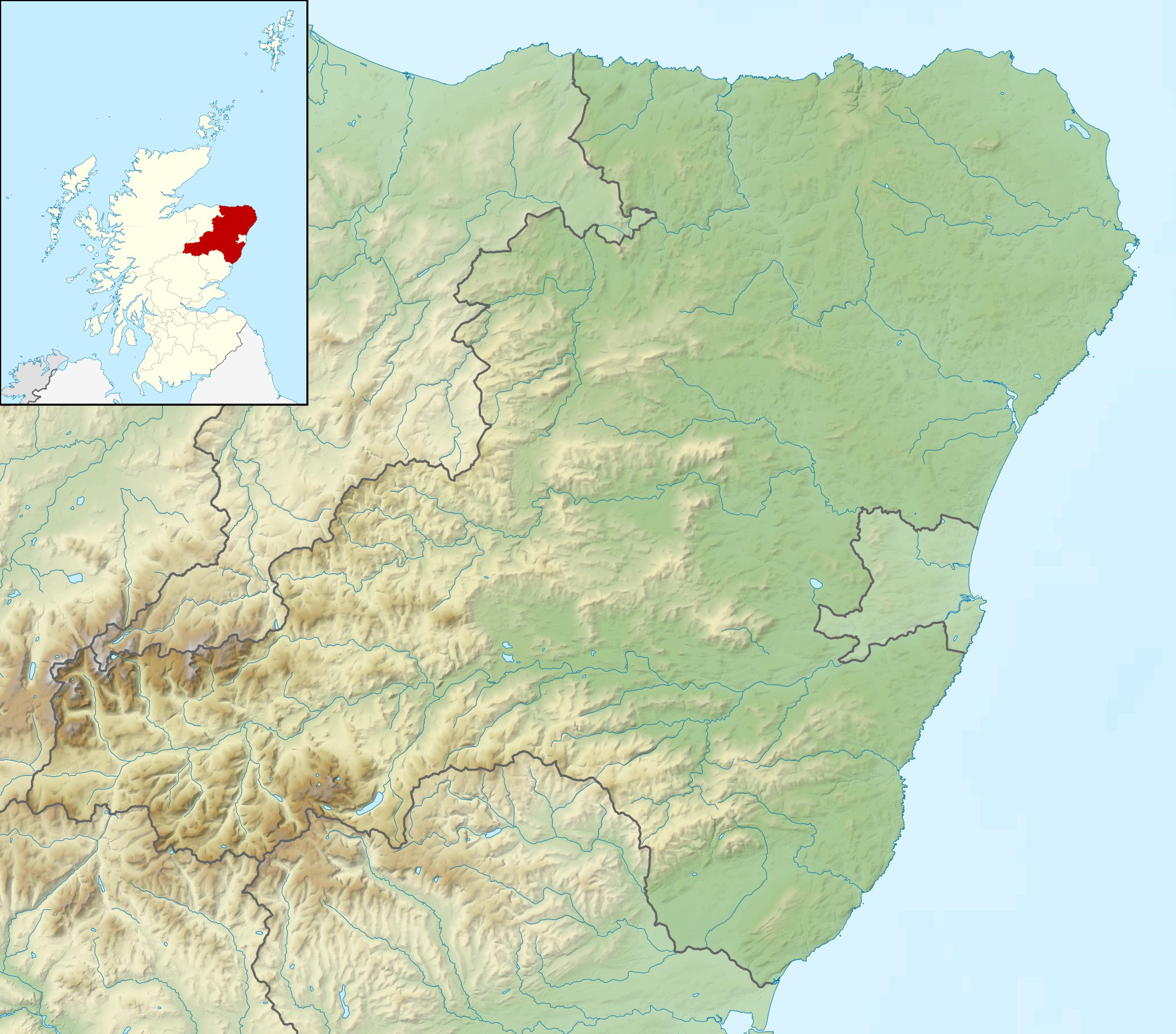
- Location within Aberdeenshire
- Location: Grampian, Scotland
- Coordinates: 57.0874°N 2.767°W
- Type: artificial formed freshwater loch
- Basin countries: Scotland
- Surface area: 12.2 ha (30 acres)
- Average depth: 1.8 m (6 ft)
- Max. depth: 3.4 m (11 ft)
- Water volume: 280,000 m^{3} (10,000,000 ft^{3})
- Shore length^{1}: 2.2 km (1.4 mi)
- Surface elevation: 136 m (446 ft)
- Islands: 0
- ^{1} Shore length is not a well-defined measure.

Loch of Aboyne is a shallow, artificial formed, freshwater loch in Grampian, Scotland. It lies 1 1/4 miles (2 km) northeast of Aboyne and 28 miles (45 km) west-southwest of Aberdeen. An earthen dam was constructed around 1834 to retain the loch. It also served as a reservoir for a nearby mill.

== Survey ==
The loch was surveyed on 13 July 1905 by T.N. Johnston and L.W. Collett and later charted as part of the Sir John Murray's Bathymetrical Survey of Fresh-Water Lochs of Scotland 1897-1909.

== Flora and fauna ==
The loch was designated a Site of Special Scientific Interest in 1984 owing to its aquatic flora and fauna and rich reedbed and fen vegetation. It has one of the finest submerged floras in the area with 8 species of pondweeds. There is a high diversity of leeches and pond snails and modest numbers of passage and wintering wildfowl including wigeon, goosander and whooper swans. It provides a valuable habitat for waterfowl and other birds, with Osprey regularly seen plucking fish from the water. It is also an important site for butterflies.

== Leisure and recreation ==
Aberdeen Waterski and Wakeboard Club uses the loch for its activities and the club was also responsible for repairing the dam in the late 1980s. In winter, when ice forms on the loch, it is used for curling. A bonspiel was held here in 1891 and the Aboyne Curling Club had its own private railway station named Aboyne Curling Pond railway station, the remains of which can still be seen.

Fishing is available by permit and the existing stock of perch, pike and eels was supplemented in 2002 and 2003 with common roach, bream, ide and carp. On the north shore of the loch is the Aboyne Golf Club and course. The Aboyne Loch Caravan Park lies on a peninsula which extends into the loch, and The Lodge on the Loch health spa is located on the north shore.

== See also ==
- List of reservoirs and dams in the United Kingdom
