= Ballater railway station =

Disused railway station in Ballater, Aberdeenshire

Coordinates: 57.05074°N 3.04024°W

Ballater
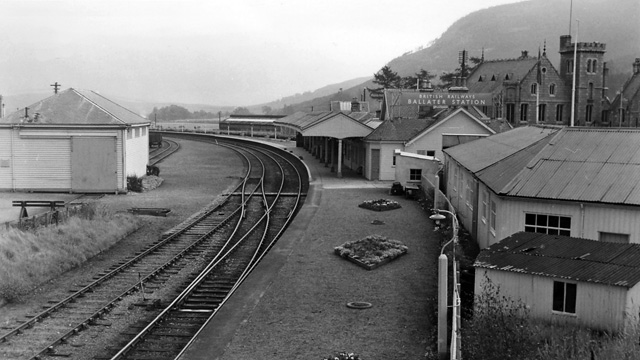
- Ballater railway station in 1961

General information
- Location: Aberdeenshire; Scotland
- Platforms: 2

Other information
- Status: Disused

History
- Original company: Aboyne and Braemar Railway
- Pre-grouping: Great North of Scotland Railway
- Post-grouping: London and North Eastern Railway

Key dates
- 17 October 1866: Station opened
- 28 February 1966: Station closed to passengers
- 18 July 1966: station closed to goods
- 12 May 2015: Fire seriously damages former station
Location

Ballater railway station is a former station in the village of Ballater in Aberdeenshire, Scotland. The station was formerly the terminus of a branch line from Aberdeen.

It was the nearest station to Balmoral Castle, a personal residence of the British monarch.

== History ==
Opened on 17 October 1866 by the Aboyne and Braemar Railway this was the third of a series of openings (Aboyne to Ballater), by two different companies to connect Ballater with Aberdeen, the others were Banchory to Aberdeen by the Deeside Railway and Aboyne to Banchory by the Deeside Railway Company as the Deeside Railway Extension.

All three sections of the branch were operated by the Great North of Scotland Railway (GNSR) and in 1876 they were all acquired by it.

The GNSR became part of the London and North Eastern Railway during the Grouping of 1923, passing on to the Scottish Region of British Railways during the nationalisation of 1948.

The station was host to a LNER camping coach from 1937 to 1939.

The station closed for passengers on 28 February 1966 and for goods on 18 July 1966.

== Royal events ==
In August 1912, Ballater railway station played an important role when the body of Alexander Duff, 1st Duke of Fife, the son-in-law of King Edward VII, was transferred to Mar Lodge, Braemar, from St George's Chapel, Windsor Castle. On 9 August 1912 the Glasgow Herald reported on the funeral:

The casket arrived at Aberdeen from Euston at 7.15 yesterday morning, being conveyed in a special saloon which at Aberdeen was attached to the 8.5 a.m. train for Ballater. Heavy rain showers had fallen on Deeside in the early morning, and when the train reached Ballater shortly after ten o'clock the atmosphere was depressingly gloomy, while the distant hills to the West were thickly enveloped in mist, adding a further melancholy note to the circumstances attending the sad home-bringing of the departed Chief of the Duffs. Travelling in the special saloon from London to Ballater were Sir Maurice Abbot-Anderson and Lady Anderson and Dr Essery, while awaiting the arrival of the train at Ballater were Mr W[illia]m Mackintosh, factor and commissioner on the Mar estates; Mr C. H. Taylor, private secretary to the late Duke; and eight members of the Duff Highlanders, specially selected to transfer the casket from the train to a motor hearse which was in waiting to convey the remains over the 18 odd miles to New Mar Lodge. Many hundreds of residents and visitors to the district had assembled in the Station Square and reverently observed the Highlanders transfer the massive polished oak coffin from the saloon to the hearse. Over the casket was laid a Union Jack, which was the only touch of colour associated with the sombre vehicle.

Ballater Station was the location of an infamous event on 23 September 1936. On this day, King Edward VIII was due to open a new hospital in Aberdeen; however, he sent the then Duke and Duchess of York (later King George VI and Queen Elizabeth) in his place, citing that he was unable to attend as the Court was still in mourning. This was a foil. Edward VIII was seen at precisely the same time as the Yorks' opened the hospital, meeting Wallis Simpson off a train at Ballater Station. Mrs Simpson at the time was the mistress of Edward VIII though this fact was relatively unknown to the British public at this time owing to a 'silence' in the British press. Mrs Simpson was the King's special guest at Balmoral.

== Services ==
Preceding station	Disused railways	Following station
Cambus O'May; Line and station closed	Great North of Scotland Railway; Deeside Railway	Terminus

== Fire ==
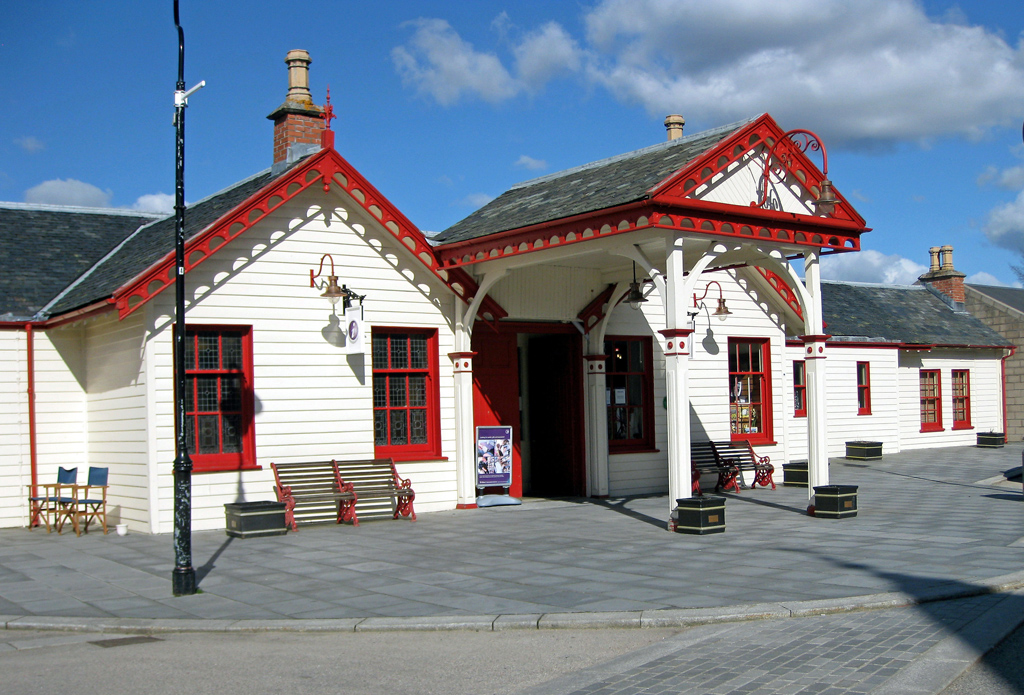
The former station, in use as Ballater visitor centre in 2014, a year prior to the fire

In the early hours of 12 May 2015, fire crews were called out to a major blaze at the station. The fire was fought for around three hours but reports say the building was "around 90 per cent destroyed". The fire is believed to have started in the Station Restaurant, one of several businesses at the station.

== Current use ==
After the fire, the old station was rebuilt and adapted. Containing Queen Victoria's waiting room, it used to be a visitor centre with a replica royal carriage. The station houses the public library and a restaurant and café.

The former station site is the western trailhead of the Deeside Way, a long-distance footpath that follows the length of the former railway to Aberdeen.

The station was awarded Project of the Year, and the Conservation award, in 2019 in the Aberdeen Society of Architects annual design awards.

== See also ==
- Royal Deeside Line
