= Deeside Way =

Walking and cycling route following a disused railway line in Aberdeenshire, Scotland

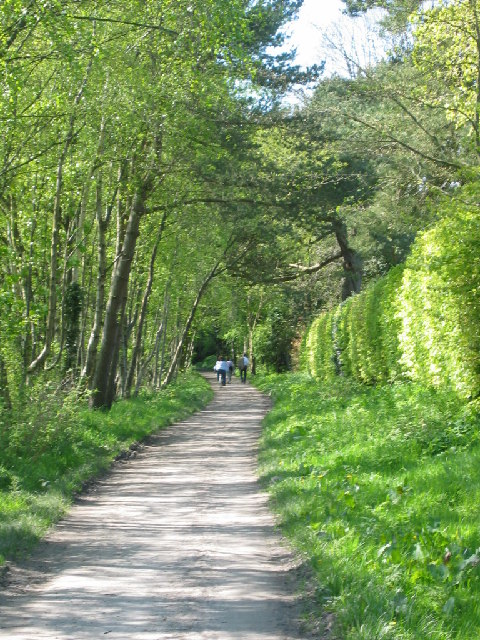
- Length: 41 miles (66 km)
- Location: Aberdeenshire, Scotland
- Trailheads: Duthie Park 57°7′49″N 2°6′14″W; Ballater railway station 57°3′3″N 3°2′25″W
- Use: Walking, cycling and horse riding
- Highest point: 676 feet (206 m)
- Season: All Year
- Waymark: Yes
- Website: http://www.deesideway.org/

The Deeside Way is a 41-mile (66 km) rail trail that follows, in part, the bed of the former Deeside Railway in Aberdeenshire. Forming part of the National Cycle Network (National Route 195) the trail leads from Aberdeen to Ballater.

== The route ==
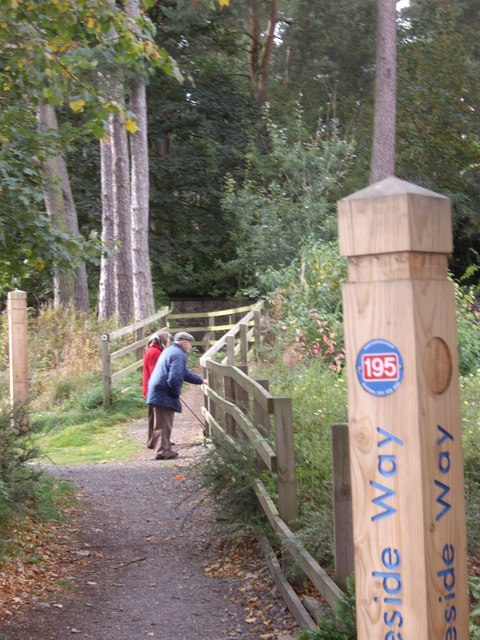
Waymark on the footpath

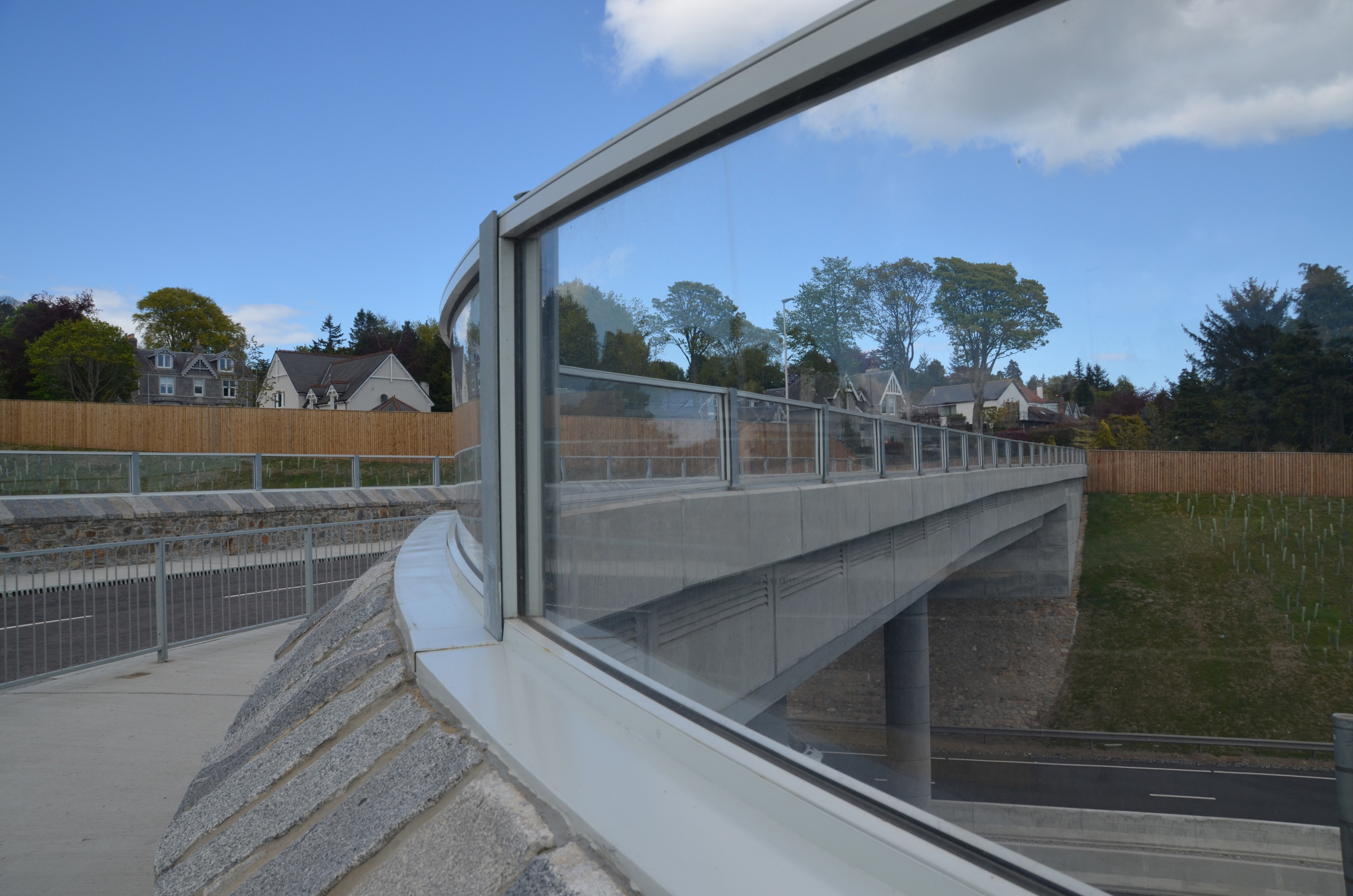
The Deeside Way crossing the A90

The pathway runs from Duthie Park, Aberdeen to Peterculter, with two breaks across quiet country roads and a larger one at the busy Milltimber Brae. It then leaves the route of the old line, following a country road for around a mile along Coalford Croft to Old Manse Wood, whence there is a narrow path into Drumoak. The route follows a pavement beside the A93 North Deeside Road for a few hundred yards to a signposted path that rejoins the former railway line to Crathes, where it is necessary to use another short stretch of pavement beside the A93 and the A957 to a minor road onto the path once more. This leads past Milton of Crathes, and alongside the Deeside Railway to arrive in Bellfield Park in Banchory.

The route from Banchory continues on the South side of the river through Blackhall Woods to Potarch. From Potarch the path returns to the North side of the river, and runs over a bridge before heading alongside the River Dee, and through the main street of Kincardine O'Neil. The route then passes through the Dess woods and past the Dess waterfall, before rejoining the old railway line near the former Dess station.

== History ==
Interest in using the route for recreational purposes for pedestrians and cyclists began in 1971 with the publication of the Parham Report; in 1992 Kincardine and Deeside District Council undertook a feasibility study into creating the Deeside Way. Some parts of the line were acquired for public ownership and the route has been developed in sections over the years. The current route was conceived by Mark Hagger in 2000. After winning the support of Aberdeenshire Council and the Community Councils along the route, Mark worked for 10 years as a consultant to the Council, which managed the project. The route was based on negotiation and voluntary agreement with landowners, and broadly follows the river Dee and the old railway line. It was developed in stages, as funding and agreement became available.

The Deeside Way is now almost complete between Duthie Park in Aberdeen and the Station Square in Ballater. There is currently a 1 mile (1.6 km) gap in the route east of Aboyne from Kirkton to the Victory Hall, although there is an agreement for users to pass through on the unimproved route of the old railway. There are plans to extend the path from Ballater to Braemar.

A bridge across Holburn Street in Aberdeen was built in 2005, and in March 2010 another bridge was opened over West Cults Road.

Laying of tarmac along sections of the path within built-up areas of Aberdeen has taken place to improve from the current path which floods leading to thick mud patches during the autumn and winter months.. The aggregate path in Aberdeenshire has been extensively resurfaced in 2015 and 2021.

== Places of interest ==
- Duthie Park
- Crathes Castle
- Drum Castle
- Scolty Hill
- Burn O'Vat
- Cambus O' May bridge
- Cambus O'May railway station
- Tullich
- River Dee, Aberdeenshire
- Kincardine O'Neil Hospital, Aberdeenshire
- Muir of Dinnet
- Ballater railway station

== See also ==
- Dava Way
- Speyside Way
- List of rail trails
