= Ballater =

Village in Aberdeenshire, Scotland

Coordinates: 57.0448°N 3.04942°W

Ballater: Scottish Gaelic: Bealadair
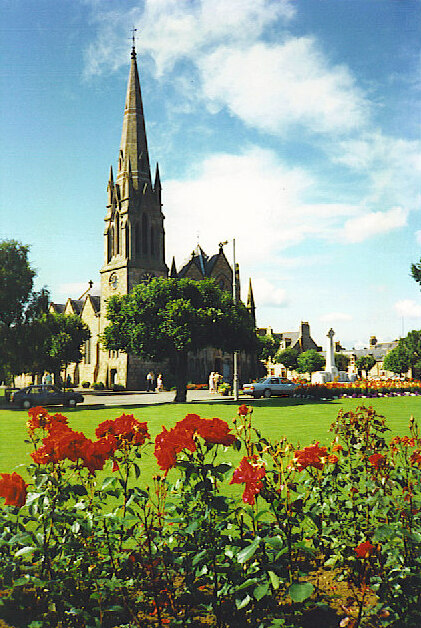
- Glenmuick Parish Church, in the square

- Location within Aberdeenshire
- Population: 1,430 (2020)
- OS grid reference: NO369958
  - Edinburgh: 76 mi (122 km)
  - London: 400 mi (644 km)
- Council area: Aberdeenshire
- Lieutenancy area: Aberdeenshire
- Country: Scotland
- Sovereign state: United Kingdom
- Post town: BALLATER
- Postcode district: AB35
- Dialling code: 01339
- Police: Scotland
- Fire: Scottish
- Ambulance: Scottish
- UK Parliament: West Aberdeenshire and Kincardine
- Scottish Parliament: Aberdeenshire West

Ballater (/ˈbælətər/, Scottish Gaelic: Bealadair) is a village in Aberdeenshire, Scotland, on the River Dee, immediately east of the Cairngorm Mountains. Situated at an elevation of 213 metres (699 feet), Ballater is a centre for hikers and known for its spring water, once said to cure scrofula. It is home to more than 1400 inhabitants and has had a long connection with the British royal family.

== History ==
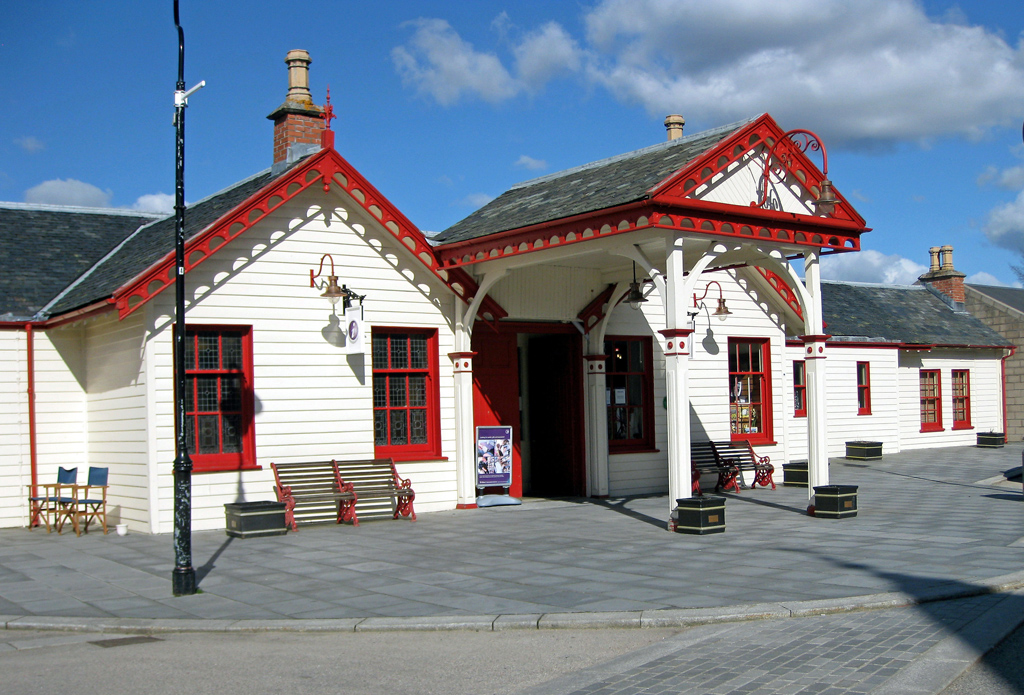
The old railway station now used as a visitor and exhibition centre

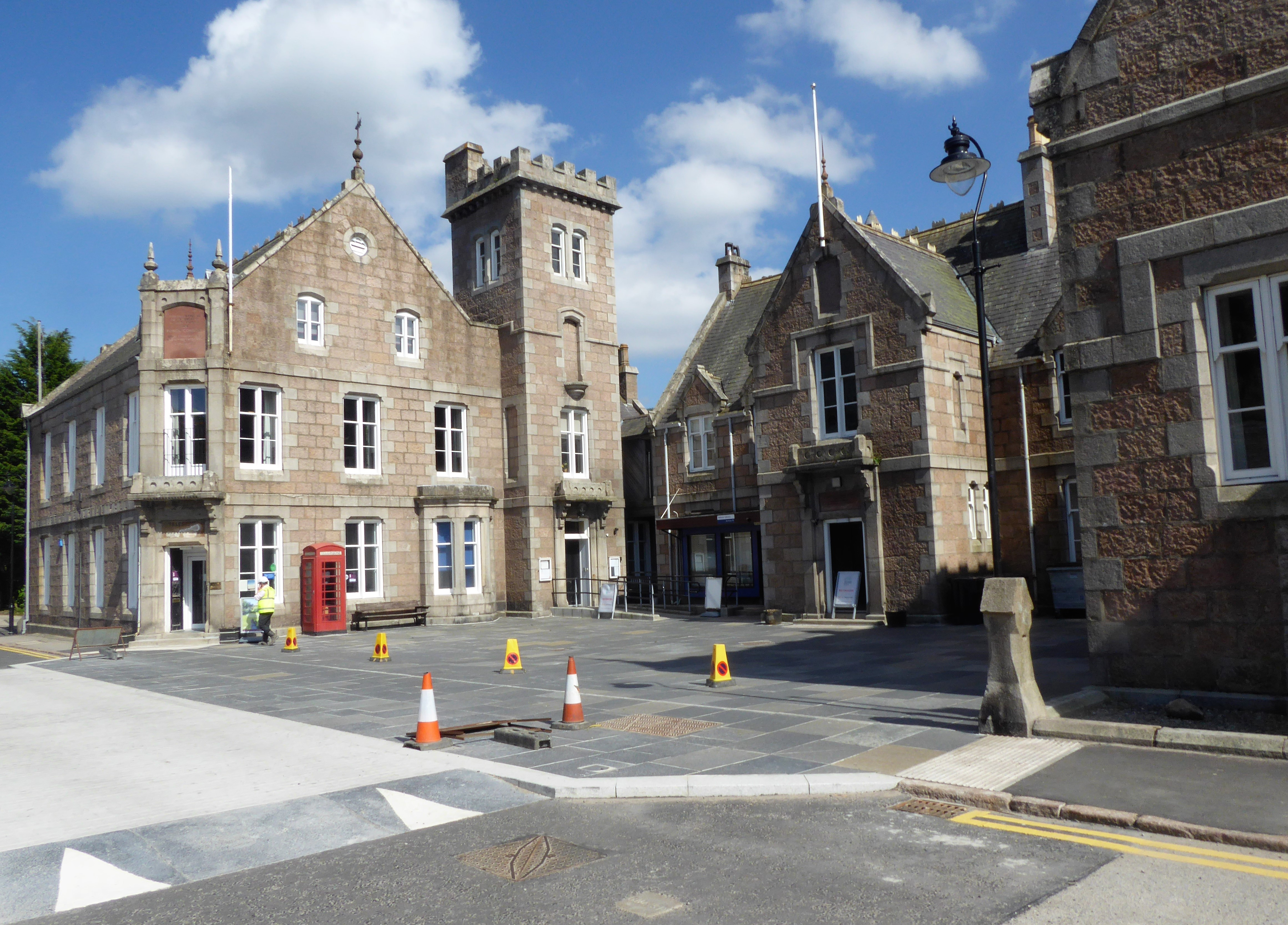
Victoria and Albert Halls

The medieval pattern of development along this reach of the River Dee was influenced by the ancient trackways across the Grampian Mounth, which determined strategic locations of castles and other Deeside settlements of the Middle Ages.

In the early 14th century, the area was part of the estates of the Knights of St John, but the settlement did not develop until around 1770; first as a spa resort to accommodate visitors to the Pannanich Mineral Well, then later upon the arrival of the railway in 1866 it was visited by many tourists taking advantage of the easier access thus afforded. The Victoria and Albert Halls, opposite the railway station, were completed in 1895.

Ballater railway station, the former terminus of the Deeside Railway, was closed in 1966, but remains in use as a visitor centre with an exhibition recording the village's royal connection. Many buildings date from the Victorian era and the centre of the village is a conservation area. The old visitor centre was substantially damaged by fire in May 2015 but has subsequently been restored and reopened.

The first stone bridge over the Dee at Ballater was built in 1783, but lost to floods in 1789. Thomas Telford constructed a second stone bridge in 1809, which was swept away in 1829. A wooden bridge was built in 1834, and replaced by the present stone bridge in 1885. Queen Victoria opened the bridge in November 1885, naming it the Royal Bridge.

== Glenmuick Church ==
After the first bridge over the River Dee had been built the village developed with a "Centrical Church" replacing the churches at Tullich, Glengairn and Foot o' Gairn which had become ruins.

A foundation stone was laid in 1798 and the first service was held on 14 December 1800. The church was designed by Mr Massey of Aberdeen and cost £670. It measured 72 feet (22 m) long by 34 feet (10 m) wide. Doors, at the east and west ends, each had a stair leading to a gallery. The building had four windows at the front and two gable windows, all glazed with plain glass. In the interior was a pulpit, a sound board, a latron and stair and rail. In 1879 a clock was manufactured by Messrs Gillett & Brand of Croydon; the winding mechanism was electrified in 1982. A vestry was added in the early 1850s.

== Royal connection ==
Balmoral Castle, the British royal family's holiday home, lies 7 miles (11 kilometres) west, and the family has visited the town frequently since the time of Queen Victoria. Birkhall lies 1 mile (1.5 kilometres) southwest of Ballater. Victoria Barracks is used by the Royal Guard for the castle.

For decades, local stores had royal warrants bestowed upon them. Five years after the death of Queen Elizabeth The Queen Mother, who had granted them, the warrants lapsed and, to the chagrin of many townsfolk and especially shop owners, they were not renewed. Shops which still display the arms marking the royal warrant include the butchers H. M. Sheridan.

In September 2022, following the death of Queen Elizabeth II, the cortège bearing her coffin passed through the village, on its way to Edinburgh.

== Climate ==
A Met Office weather station collects weather data at Balmoral, just over 7 miles (11 kilometres) west of Ballater. Like most of Scotland and the British Isles, Ballater experiences a maritime climate with cool summers and mild winters. Its upland position means temperatures throughout the year are cooler than lower-lying areas, and snowfall more plentiful during winter months.

Climate data for Balmoral: 283 m (928 ft) 1991–2020 normals, extremes 1960–2020
Month	Jan	Feb	Mar	Apr	May	Jun	Jul	Aug	Sep	Oct	Nov	Dec	Year
Record high °C (°F)	15.8 (60.4)	15.1 (59.2)	22.7 (72.9)	22.7 (72.9)	25.8 (78.4)	29.9 (85.8)	29.0 (84.2)	29.5 (85.1)	25.4 (77.7)	20.9 (69.6)	17.3 (63.1)	14.7 (58.5)	29.9 (85.8)
Mean daily maximum °C (°F)	5.2 (41.4)	5.7 (42.3)	7.8 (46.0)	10.5 (50.9)	13.9 (57.0)	16.2 (61.2)	18.3 (64.9)	17.5 (63.5)	15.1 (59.2)	11.2 (52.2)	7.6 (45.7)	5.5 (41.9)	11.2 (52.2)
Daily mean °C (°F)	2.0 (35.6)	2.2 (36.0)	3.9 (39.0)	6.0 (42.8)	8.8 (47.8)	11.6 (52.9)	13.6 (56.5)	12.9 (55.2)	10.8 (51.4)	7.4 (45.3)	4.2 (39.6)	2.0 (35.6)	7.1 (44.8)
Mean daily minimum °C (°F)	−1.3 (29.7)	−1.2 (29.8)	−0.2 (31.6)	1.5 (34.7)	3.7 (38.7)	6.9 (44.4)	8.8 (47.8)	8.3 (46.9)	6.5 (43.7)	3.7 (38.7)	0.8 (33.4)	−1.5 (29.3)	3.0 (37.4)
Record low °C (°F)	−23.5 (−10.3)	−19.5 (−3.1)	−18.2 (−0.8)	−10.0 (14.0)	−6.7 (19.9)	−3.3 (26.1)	−1.0 (30.2)	−3.0 (26.6)	−4.8 (23.4)	−7.8 (18.0)	−16.7 (1.9)	−22.7 (−8.9)	−23.5 (−10.3)
Average rainfall mm (inches)	87.6 (3.45)	62.6 (2.46)	54.4 (2.14)	60.3 (2.37)	52.8 (2.08)	56.2 (2.21)	61.0 (2.40)	67.1 (2.64)	59.0 (2.32)	97.3 (3.83)	90.1 (3.55)	88.0 (3.46)	834.2 (32.84)
Average rainy days (≥ 1 mm)	13.6	12.4	12.0	10.7	10.9	10.9	11.2	10.5	10.1	13.9	14.2	14.4	144.8
Source 1: Meteoclimat
Source 2: KNMI (extremes)

Climate data for Balmoral (283 m or 928 ft asl, averages 1971–2000, extremes 1960–present)
Month	Jan	Feb	Mar	Apr	May	Jun	Jul	Aug	Sep	Oct	Nov	Dec	Year
Record high °C (°F)	15.8 (60.4)	13.9 (57.0)	17.8 (64.0)	22.7 (72.9)	25.3 (77.5)	28.3 (82.9)	29.0 (84.2)	29.5 (85.1)	25.4 (77.7)	20.9 (69.6)	17.3 (63.1)	14.2 (57.6)	29.5 (85.1)
Mean daily maximum °C (°F)	4.6 (40.3)	5.0 (41.0)	7.0 (44.6)	9.6 (49.3)	13.1 (55.6)	15.8 (60.4)	18.2 (64.8)	17.5 (63.5)	14.1 (57.4)	10.7 (51.3)	7.0 (44.6)	5.2 (41.4)	10.7 (51.2)
Mean daily minimum °C (°F)	−2.0 (28.4)	−1.9 (28.6)	−0.3 (31.5)	0.8 (33.4)	3.2 (37.8)	6.2 (43.2)	8.3 (46.9)	7.8 (46.0)	5.9 (42.6)	3.3 (37.9)	0.2 (32.4)	−1.3 (29.7)	2.5 (36.5)
Record low °C (°F)	−23.5 (−10.3)	−19.5 (−3.1)	−18.2 (−0.8)	−10 (14)	−6.7 (19.9)	−3.3 (26.1)	−1.0 (30.2)	−3.0 (26.6)	−4.8 (23.4)	−7.8 (18.0)	−16.7 (1.9)	−22.7 (−8.9)	−23.5 (−10.3)
Average precipitation mm (inches)	96.72 (3.81)	59.04 (2.32)	65.26 (2.57)	57.92 (2.28)	57.31 (2.26)	52.76 (2.08)	51.09 (2.01)	58.75 (2.31)	75.3 (2.96)	93.3 (3.67)	84.89 (3.34)	80.56 (3.17)	832.9 (32.78)
Source 1: Royal Dutch Meteorological Institute/KNMI
Source 2: Met Office for December record high

== Attractions ==
Ballater is a centre for tourism in Royal Deeside, with the Cairngorms and Balmoral Castle nearby. There are two bike hire shops in the village.

The old Ballater station, containing Queen Victoria's waiting room, was for many years a visitor centre with a replica royal carriage. However, the building was almost completely destroyed by fire in 2015. The rebuilding of the station, bistro and adjoining visitor centre was undertaken and subsequently completed in Autumn 2018. Balmoral Castle is a 10-minute drive from the village.

There are many walks from the village. For the easy going walker, there is Craigendarroch, a small, peculiarly shaped hill near the village. About 12 km (7 miles) south-west of Ballater is Loch Muick. From there experienced walkers can head up the prominent mountain, Lochnagar. Ballater is the home of many challenging walks due to the abundance of Munroes in the area.

There are many well-mapped cycle routes from Ballater into the surrounding areas, including the Deeside Way and a number of popular mountain biking trails. The forests at Cambus o'May have trails for experienced riders.

The River Dee flows through Ballater, and is famous for salmon fishing.

Events in the town include:

- The Ballater Walking Festival each May attracts many hillwalkers of all levels. Participants are guided through the hills and valleys of the eastern Cairngorms.
- The Ballater Boules Challenge, on alternate Sundays from November to March each year, provides an alternative sport when the weather is not cold enough for the traditional game of curling.
- Victoria Week, held annually in August, is a celebration of Ballater's connection with Queen Victoria and Balmoral Castle.

The village has its own 'tongue in cheek', on-line newspaper, the Ballater Bugle.

Recently five Ballater residents refurbished the Automobile Association's Patrol Box at Cambus o'May, one of only an estimated 8 to 10 such historical call boxes remaining in situ in Great Britain.

== Transport ==
There is a bus garage located near the village centre which provides an hourly public service to Aberdeen's Union Square bus station. The bus company was granted permission to build a new site at Pannanich Road in December 2014. In April 2015 the former bus station was re-opened as a Co-op supermarket.

== Notable residents ==
- Sir Patrick Geddes (1854–1932), biologist and botanist

== Government ==
- In local government Ballater and Crathie share a combined Community council of 13 members.
- In the UK House of Commons it is represented by the County constituency of West Aberdeenshire and Kincardine.
- In the Scottish Parliament it is represented by the County constituency of Aberdeenshire West.

== See also ==
- Aboyne, a village, 11 miles (18 km) to the east, along the A93
- List of burghs in Scotland
