= Deeside Railway =

Closed railway in Aberdeenshire, Scotland

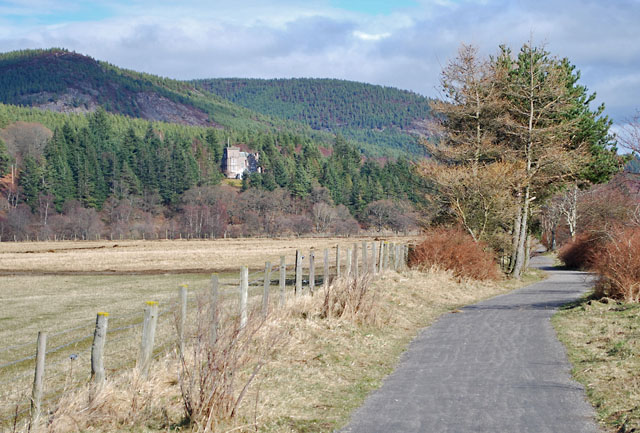
- The disused line, east of Ballater, in 2008

Overview
- Locale: Scotland
- Dates of operation: 1853–1967

Technical
- Track gauge: 1,435 mm (4 ft 8 1/2 in)

The Deeside Railway was a passenger and goods railway between Aberdeen and Ballater in Aberdeenshire, Scotland. Opening in 1853 to Banchory, an extension reached Aboyne in 1859. A separate company, the Aboyne & Braemar Railway, built an extension to Ballater and this opened in 1866. By 1855 there were five services a day over the 43 1/4-mile (69.6 km) long line, taking between 1 hour 50 minutes and 2 1/2 hours. The line was used by the Royal Train for travel to and from Balmoral Castle from 1853 and a special 'Messenger Train' ran daily when the Royal Family was in residence.

The railways were absorbed by the Great North of Scotland Railway (GNSR) on 1 August 1875 for the Deeside Railway and 31 January 1876 for the Aboyne & Braemar. The line became part of the London and North Eastern Railway in 1923, and part of British Railways when nationalised in 1948. Passenger services were withdrawn on 28 February 1966 and the line was closed completely to Ballater on 18 July 1966 and to Culter on 2 January 1967.

== Construction ==
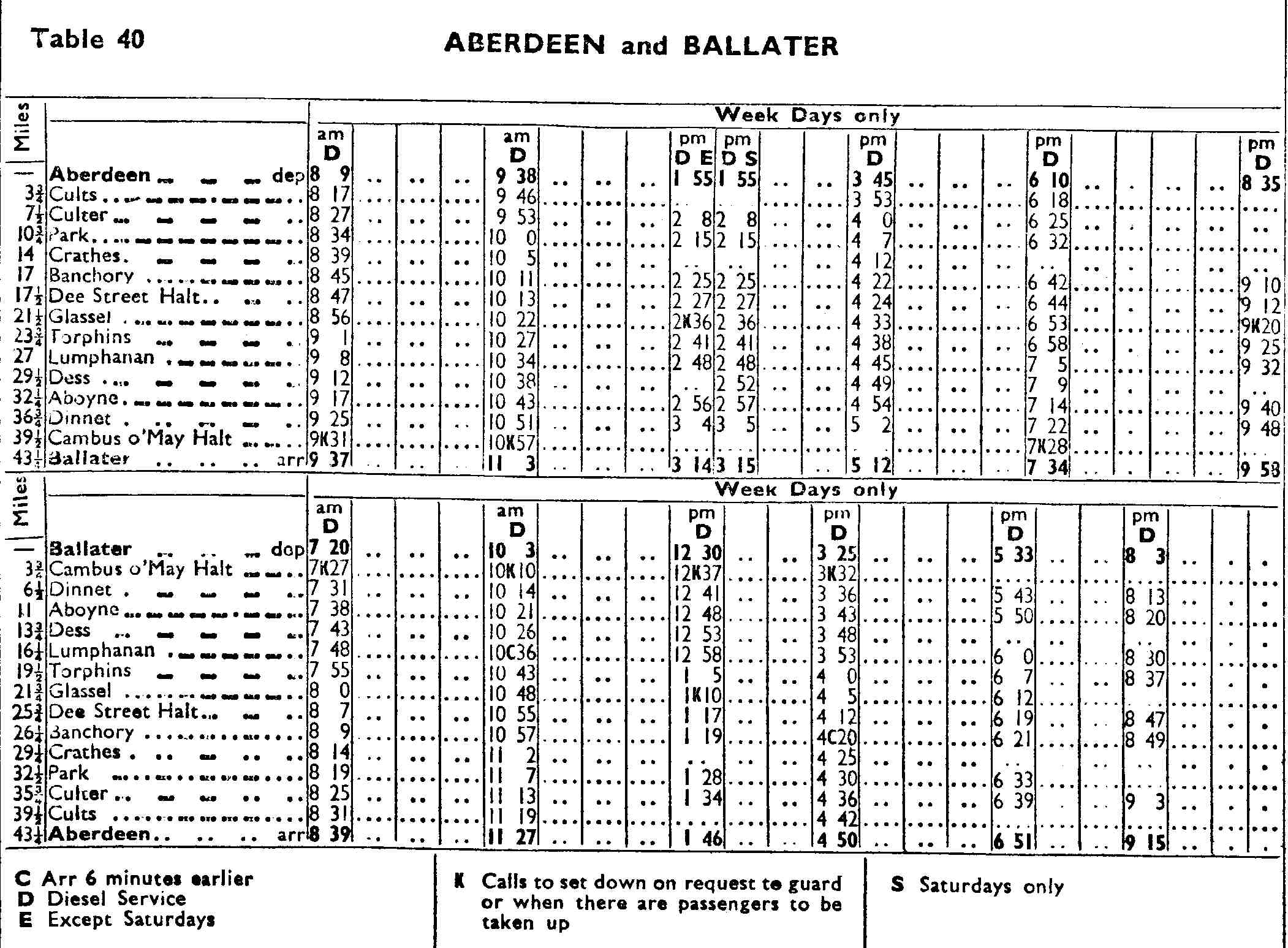
Deeside line timetable - summer 1963

Deeside Railway (Aberdeen to Aboyne) Act 1846
- Act of Parliament
- Parliament of the United Kingdom
- Long title: An Act for making a Railway from Ferryhill near Aberdeen to Aboyne, to be called "The Deeside Railway."
- Citation: 9 & 10 Vict. c. clviii

Dates
- Royal assent: 16 July 1846

Other legislation
- Repealed by: Deeside Railway Act 1852

Status: Repealed

Deeside Railway Act 1852
- Act of Parliament
- Parliament of the United Kingdom
- Long title: An Act for enabling the Deeside Railway Company to alter the Line and Levels of Part of their Railway, and to abandon Parts thereof; for altering the Capital of the Company, and repealing and amending the Act relating thereto; and for other Purposes.
- Citation: 15 & 16 Vict. c. lxi

Dates
- Royal assent: 28 May 1852

Text of statute as originally enacted

A railway to serve Deeside was first suggested in 1845. A 16-mile (26 km) long line to Banchory was estimated to cost £95,000, or £220,000 to reach Aboyne, a distance of 30 miles (48 km). This was authorised by the Deeside Railway (Aberdeen to Aboyne) Act 1846 (9 & 10 Vict. c. clviii) on 16 July 1846, but it was decided to wait for the Aberdeen Railway to open first. Shareholders wanted their money back when the railway mania bubble burst, but it survived because the Aberdeen Railway bought a large number of shares. Interest was restored after Prince Albert purchased Balmoral Castle, to which the Royal Family made their first visit in 1848, and the Aberdeen Railway was able to sell their shares. Investors were still hard to find, but by limiting the railway to a line between Ferryhill, in Aberdeen, and Banchory the Deeside Railway was able to apply to Parliament for permission in 1852. Permission was granted in the Deeside Railway Act 1852 (15 & 16 Vict. c. lxi), and the railway opened on 7 September 1853. On opening, the terminus of the railway was at Aberdeen Ferryhill railway station, which was also the terminus of the Aberdeen Railway at the time. The railway was extended north to a new terminus, Aberdeen Guild Street, in 1854.

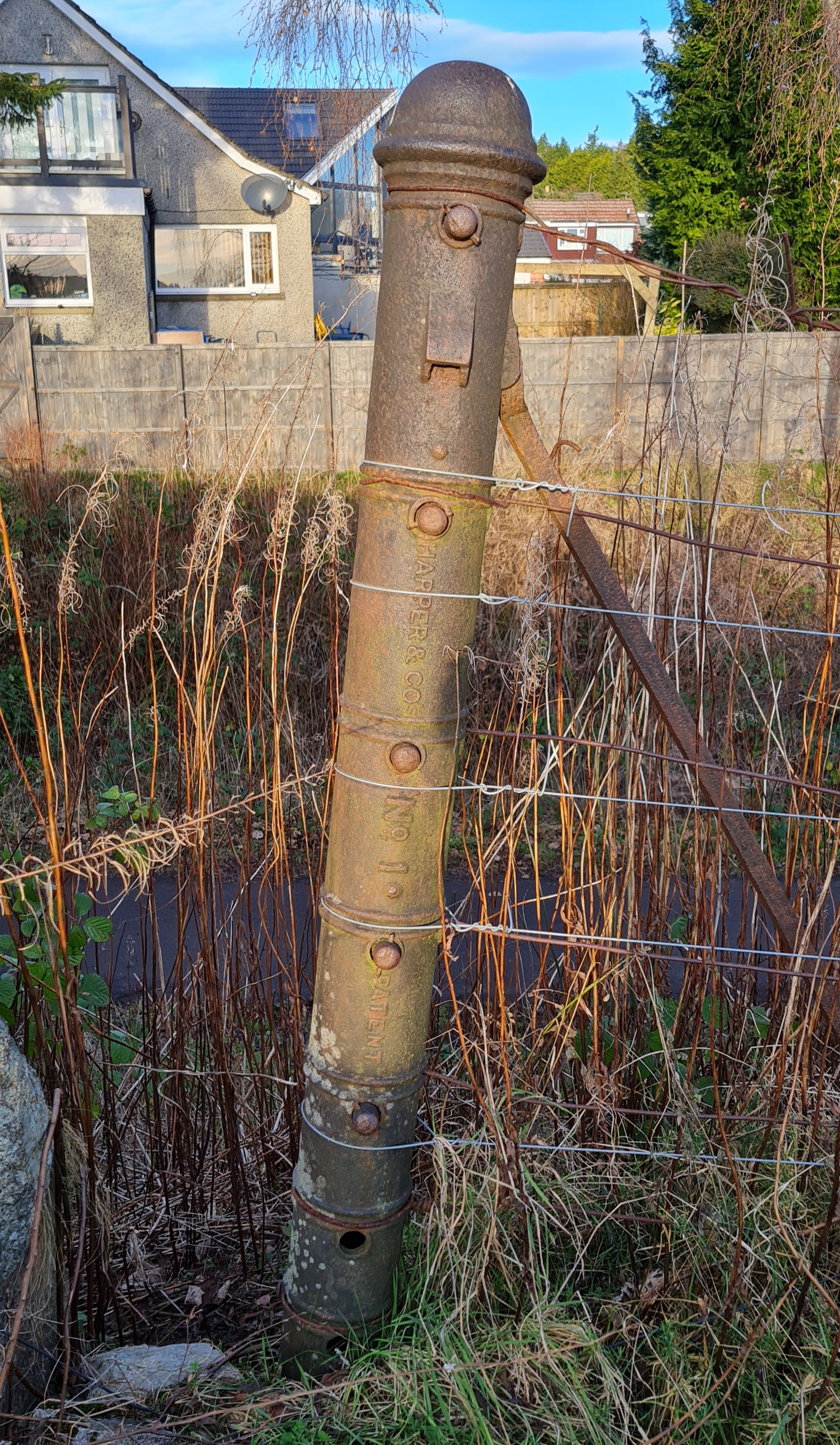
A wire fence strainer on the Deeside line near Peterculter made by Harper and Co, Ironfounders, Aberdeen.

A special train with 15 carriages travelled from Aberdeen to Banchory, and public services began the next day. There were three trains a day, taking about an hour to travel the 16 3/4 miles (27.0 km). First class accommodation was available for 1 1/2d a mile, reduced to 1 d a mile for third class. Initially the service terminated in Aberdeen at Ferryhill station, but this was extended to Guild Street when that opened in 1854, the Deeside Railway paying £700 for the first three years and then £1000 a year for the running rights. Initially the Aberdeen Railway operated the services, but only made one locomotive available, so the Deeside decided to buy its own rolling stock, and this was in service by summer 1854.

Deeside Railway Act 1862
- Act of Parliament
- Parliament of the United Kingdom
- Long title: An Act to enable the Deeside Railway Company to raise additional Capital for their original Railway; to maintain certain Portions of their Extension Railway constructed beyond the authorized Limits; and for other Purposes.
- Citation: 25 & 26 Vict. c. lxxxviii

Dates
- Royal assent: 30 June 1862

Text of statute as originally enacted

=== Deeside Railway Extension ===
Deeside Railway Extension Act 1857
- Act of Parliament
- Parliament of the United Kingdom
- Long title: An Act for making a Railway from the Deeside Railway at Banchory to Charleston of Aboyne.
- Citation: 20 & 21 Vict. c. xlix

Dates
- Royal assent: 27 July 1857

Text of statute as originally enacted

The Deeside Railway Company was authorised to extend its line to reach Aboyne by the Deeside Railway Extension Act 1857 (28 & 29 Vict. c. cclxxix) on 27 July 1857, and services began on 2 December 1859. This was officially known as the 'Deeside Railway Extension', and was not a separate company, but it was also known as the Deeside Extension Railway or the Aboyne Extension Railway.

Instead of building two bridges across the Dee, as had been proposed on 1846, the railway instead took a cheaper but 2-mile (3.2 km) longer route through Lumphanan.

=== Aboyne and Braemar Railway ===
Aboyne and Braemar Railway Act 1865
- Act of Parliament
- Parliament of the United Kingdom
- Long title: An Act for making a Railway from the Deeside Railway Extension at Charleston of Aboyne to the Bridge of Gairn, to be called "The Aboyne and Braemar Railway."
- Citation: 28 & 29 Vict. c. cclxxix

Dates
- Royal assent: 5 July 1865

Text of statute as originally enacted

The Aboyne and Braemar Railway was formed to build a line from Aboyne the 28 miles (45 km) to Braemar. This would follow the Dee, and to cross it 2 miles (3.2 km) from its terminus. However, this was modified during the parliamentary proceedings to terminate at Bridge of Gairn with the passenger terminus 1 1/2 miles (2.4 km) short at Ballater. This 12 1/2-mile (20.1 km) route was approved in the Aboyne and Braemar Railway Act 1865 (28 & 29 Vict. c. cclxxix) on 5 July 1865, and opened to Ballater on 17 October 1866. Some work was done on the line to Bridge of Gairn, but remained unfinished. By 1855 there five services a day over the 43 1/4-mile (69.6 km) long line, taking between 1 hour 50 minutes and 2 1/2 hours.

== Royal services ==
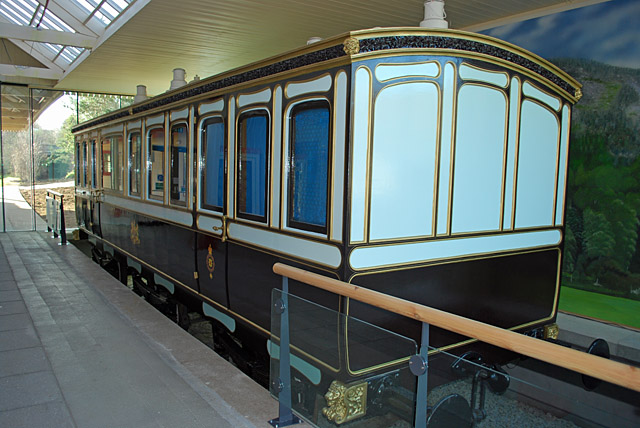
Reproduction of a royal carriage used by Queen Victoria at Ballater railway station

On 10 October 1853, the Duchess of Kent, Queen Victoria's mother, caught a special train from Banchory to Ferryhill. This left just after 1 pm and took 16 minutes to reach Ferryhill. The Queen and Albert followed three days later. As the line was extended up Deeside, closer to Balmoral, the terminus became the royal station. On 20 and 24 September 1866 the Prince and Princess of Wales, (Note: The Prince of Wales was Albert Edward, who became Edward VII in 1901. The Princess (his wife) was Alexandra of Denmark) used Ballater station nearly a month before public services reached the station.

The royal trains, which did not enter Aberdeen station but reversed at Ferryhill, took about 75 minutes to travel the 42 1/2 miles (68.4 km) to Ballater; the Queen disliked high speed. The line was cleared fifteen minutes before the train was due, the facing points and level crossing gates were locked and stations closed. At first Victoria visited once a year, this becoming twice a year after Albert died in 1861. The number of visits returned to one a year after Edward VII became King in 1901 and the train became faster, although and a slower schedule was later used for George V.

From 8 October 1865 a daily special 'Messenger Train' ran when the Royal Family was at Balmoral. This left Aberdeen at 4 am, connecting with a service from London that had left the previous morning, and returned at 2:15 pm to connect with the night train travelling south. First class accommodation was available on these trains; accompanying servants were charged third class fares. The last Messenger Train ran in 1938, subsequently couriers used a motor car from Perth.

== Great North of Scotland Railway ==
In the late 1850s and early 1860s the Great North of Scotland Railway (GNSR) and the Scottish North Eastern Railway (SNER) were in conflict over the building of a joint station in Aberdeen. Frustrated with lack of progress, the Scottish North Eastern proposed a new line from the Deeside Railway to join the GNSR at Kintore. Whilst in discussions with the SNER, a lease on the Deeside Railway was offered to the GNSR, who rapidly accepted. The Deeside board accepted the lease by a majority vote on 13 May 1862, and it was approved by Parliament in the Great North of Scotland Railway (Amalgamation) Act 1866 (29 & 30 Vict. c. cclxxxviii) on 30 July 1866. The Aboyne and Braemar Railway remained independent, although services were operated by the GNSR.

Both the Deeside Railway Company and the Aboyne and Braemar Railway Company were amalgamated into the Great North of Scotland Railway Company by the Great North of Scotland Railway (Further Powers) Act 1876 (39 & 40 Vict. c. cxxiv).

== Services ==
When the battery multiple unit was introduced, services were doubled to six trains a day from 21 April 1958, and Sunday service reinstated. The line was chosen for testing the unit because the stations were well spaced and the 1 in 70 ruling gradients would require substantial discharge rates.

== Closure ==
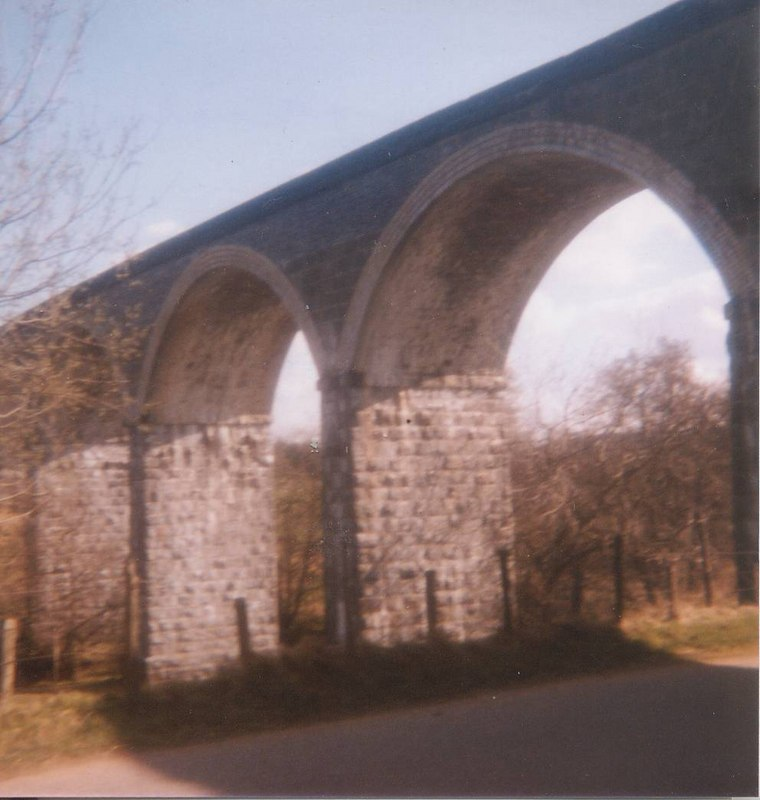
Balnacraig viaduct in 1989 shortly before demolition

Passenger services were withdrawn on 28 February 1966 and the line was closed completely to Ballater on 18 July 1966 and to Culter on 2 January 1967. Balnacraig viaduct, a five-arch structure between Torphins and Lumphanan which carried the railway, was demolished in June 1989.

== Future ==
A group, called Campaign for North East Rail, was launched in April 2021 and is campaigning for the reinstatement of the Deeside Railway between Aberdeen and Banchory.

== See also ==
- Royal Deeside Railway
- Deeside Way

== Notes and references ==
=== Books ===
- Vallance, H. A. (27 June 1991). Great North of Scotland railway. The History of the Railways of the Scottish Highlands Vol. 3. David St John Thomas. ISBN 978-0-946537-60-0.
