= Cromar =

Territorial entity in Aberdeenshire, Scotland, UK

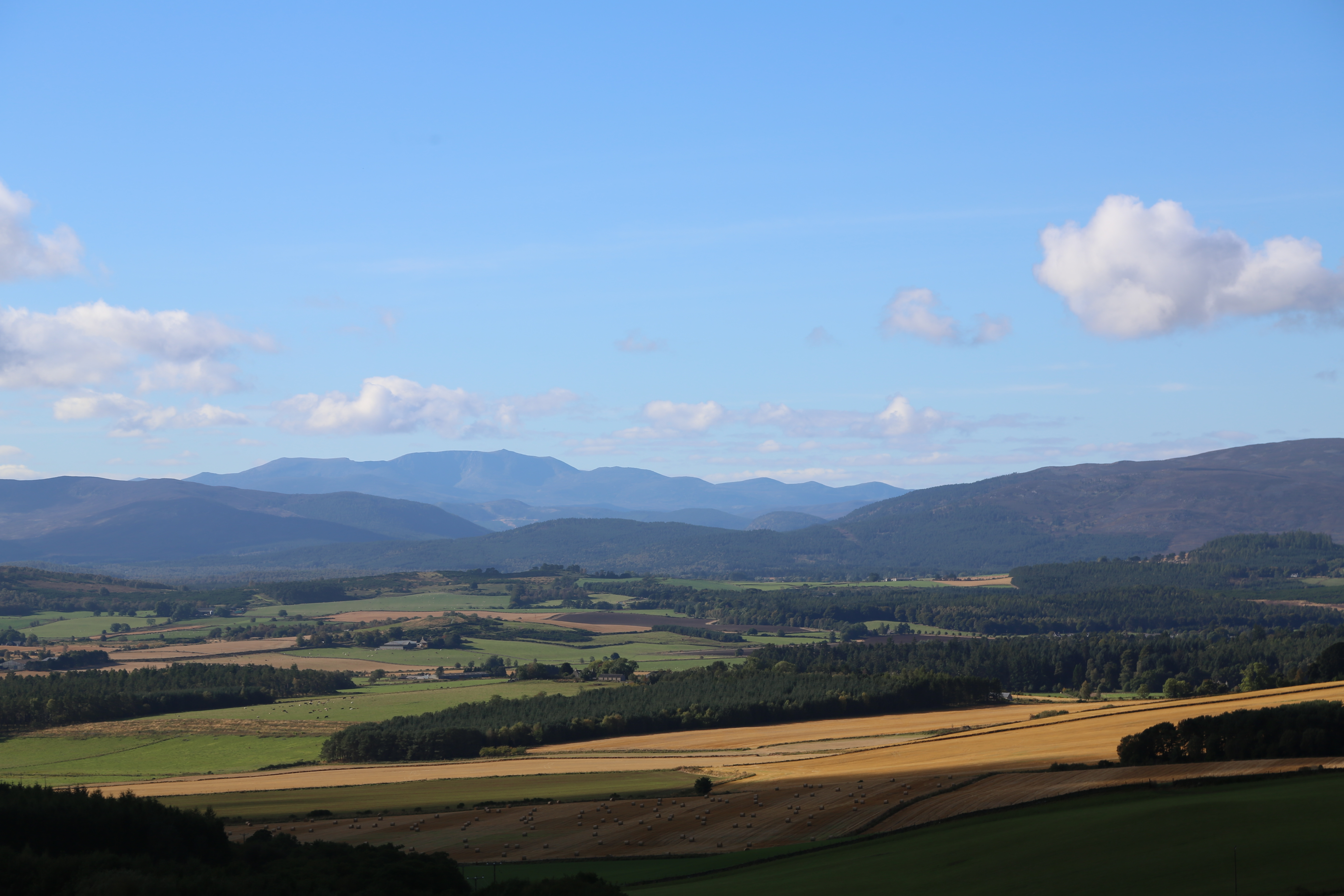
Howe of Cromar

Cromar (Scottish Gaelic: Crò Mhàrr) is an area in Aberdeenshire, north east Scotland twenty five miles inland from Aberdeen. It is also known as the Howe of Cromar.

Surrounded by a sweep of hills, dominated by Morven 871m (2858 feet), this lower lying area is a mixture of farming, forestry and settlements, principally Tarland and Logie Coldstone. It is near to Aboyne and the Muir of Dinnet.

The area has evidence of human habitation going back to 4000 BC, notably the recumbent Tomnaverie stone circle, a souterrain or earth house at Culsh, as well as numerous burial cairns, lesser stone circles, Bronze Age fortifications and Pictish Stones. These antiquities point the existence of several distinct cultures living in the Cromar over the millennia.

Shouldering Morven is Culblean, the site of the Battle of Culblean in 1335. Running off the same hill is the Burn O'Vat, here the burn has carved a cauldron like gorge in the granite. This was the hideout of the notorious 18th-century outlaw Gilderoy McGregor.

As with most of Royal Deeside, there are a number of minor mansions in the area, including Blelack, Tillypronie, Douneside and Alastrean House.

The land is mainly put to farming cattle and sheep. There are a number of commercial forest plantations but also areas of natural birch woodland. The higher ground around the Cromar is heather moorland, much of it maintained for grouse shooting. Pheasants are a common sight lower down. The area also has a population of Red Squirrels.
