= Muir of Dinnet =

National nature reserve in Scotland

Muir of Dinnet National Nature Reserve
- IUCN category II (national park)
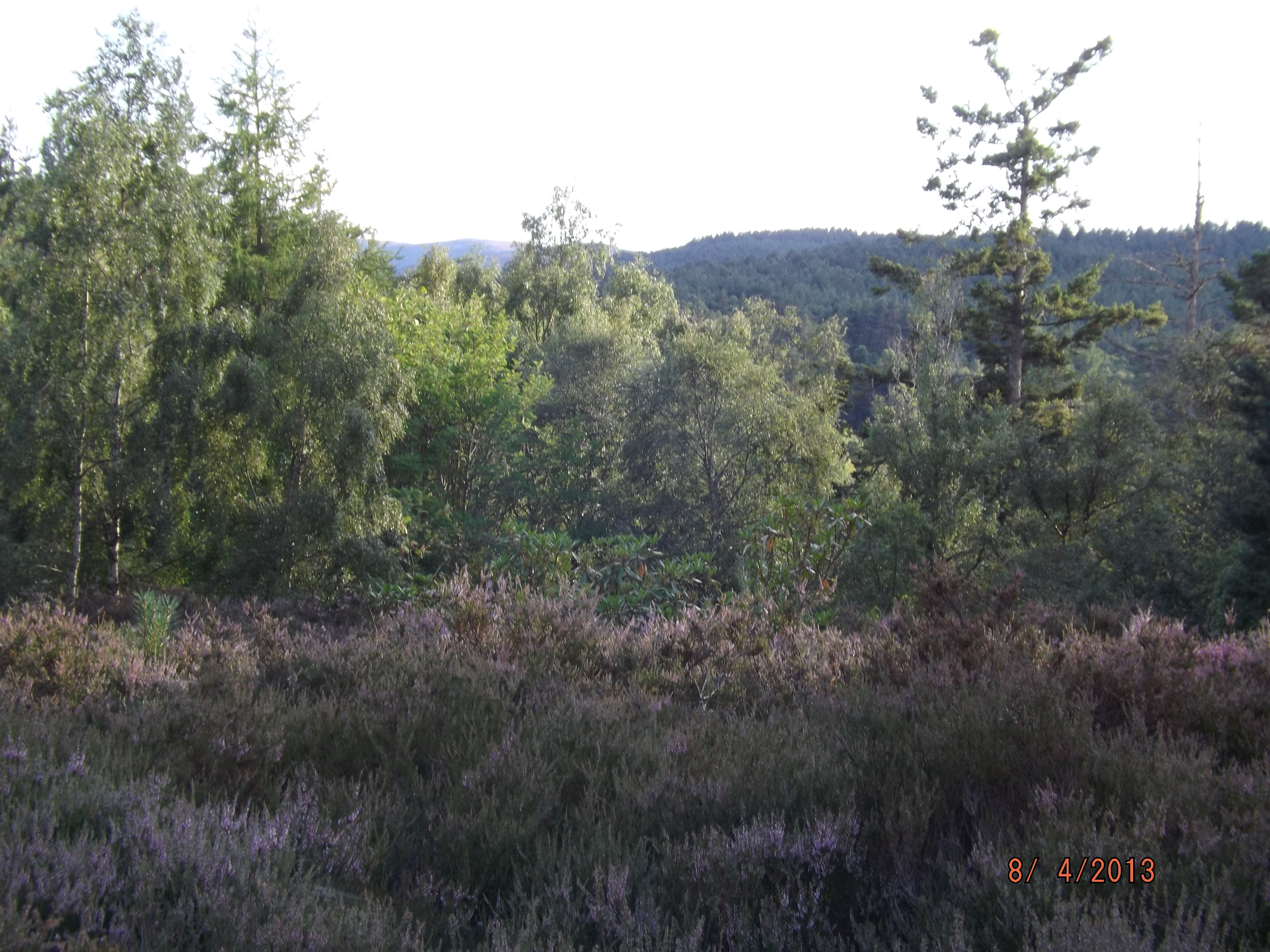

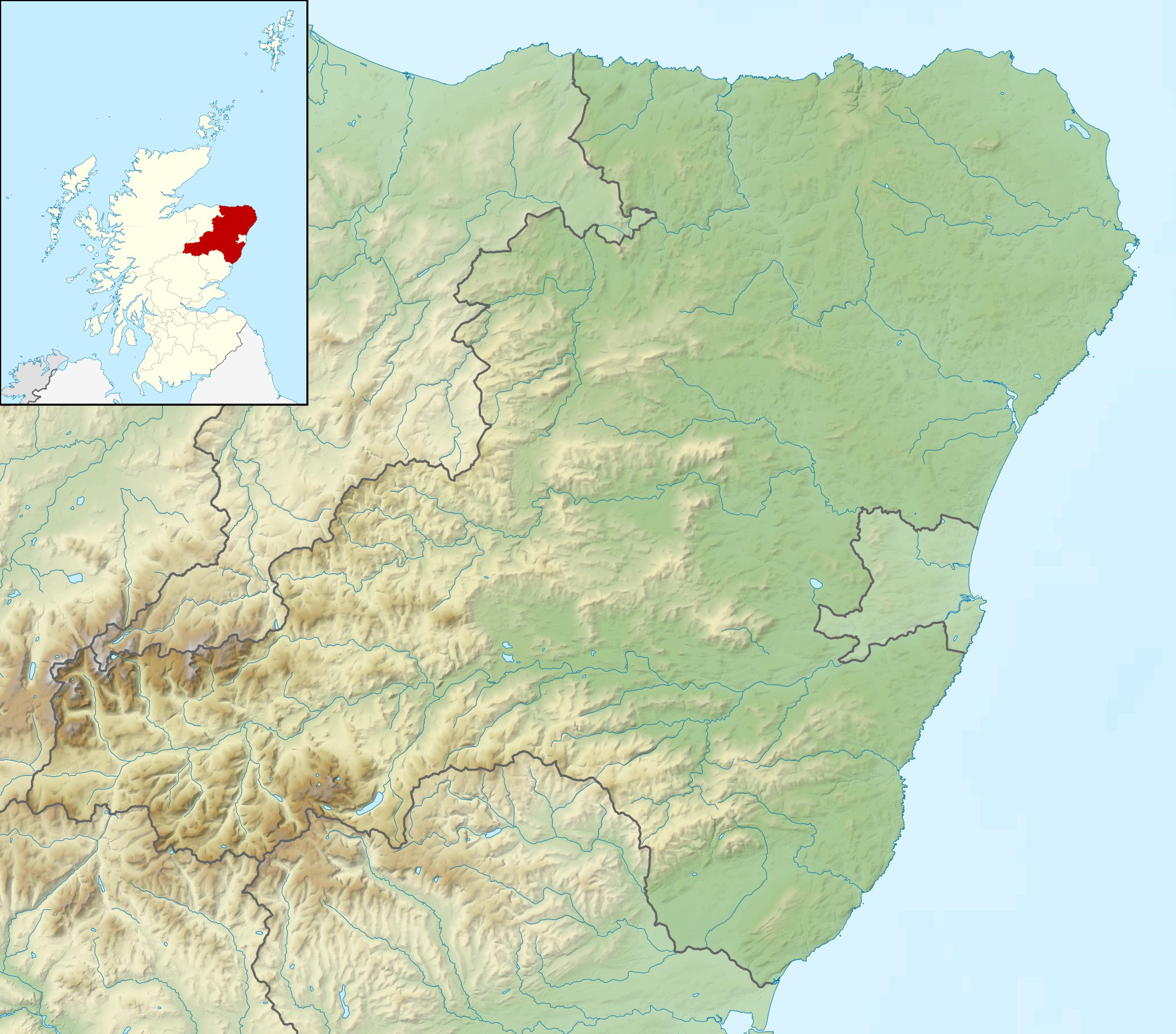
- Location within Aberdeenshire
- Location: Dinnet, Aberdeenshire, Scotland
- Coordinates: 57°4′6″N 2°55′29″W
- Area: 11.7 km^{2} (4.5 sq mi)
- Established: 1977
- Governing body: NatureScot
- Website: Muir of Dinnet National Nature Reserve

Ramsar Wetland
- Official name: Muir of Dinnet
- Designated: 22 July 1999
- Reference no.: 1003

Muir of Dinnet is a national nature reserve (NNR) situated close to the village of Dinnet in Aberdeenshire, Scotland. The reserve extends 1166 hectares from the River Dee to Culbean hill, and encompasses a wide range of habitats including dry heath, raised bog, woodland, and two lochs: Loch Kinord and Loch Davan. Muir of Dinnet was first declared a NNR in 1977 due to its value as a habitat for flora and fauna, and its important geomorphological features, the most striking of which is the Burn O'Vat. Muir of Dinnet is owned by Dinnet Estate and managed by NatureScot, who provide a visitor centre and a range of other facilities including waymarked paths and a car park. As of 2012 it was estimated that approximately 40,000 people visited Muir of Dinnet each year.

== Geology and geomorphology ==
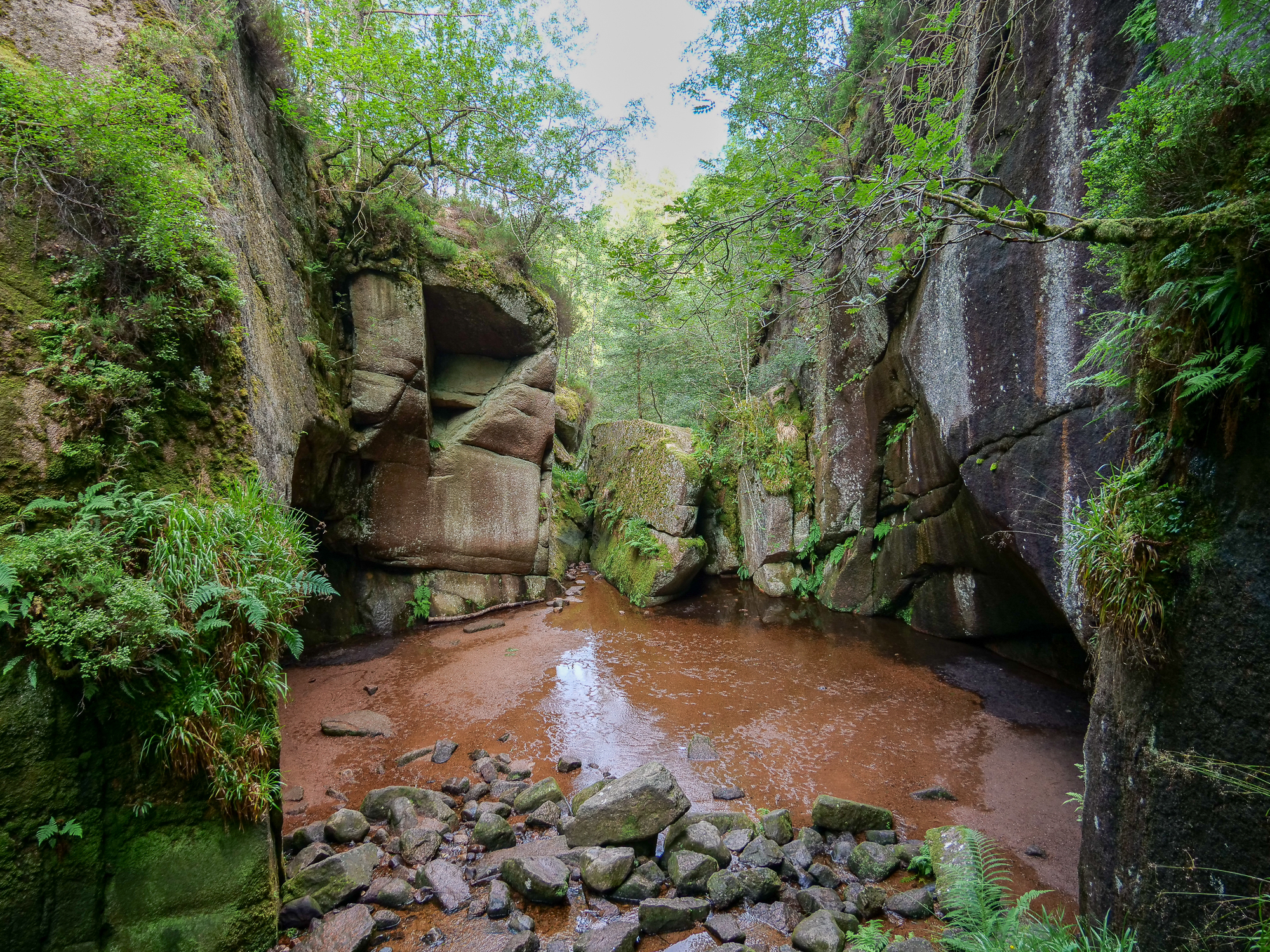
The Burn O'Vat

Most of the area is underlain by pink-coloured granite, which formed around 425 million years ago by the slow cooling of rocks that had been melted by heat during the formation of a large chain of mountains. The area around and to the south of Loch Kinord consists of an older group of rocks, known as the Dalradian series, that were laid down as layers of sand and mud on the floor of an ancient ocean around 600 million years ago. During the formation of the mountain range around 460 million years ago, they underwent metamorphosis. At Muir of Dinnet, this metamorphic rock, known as gneiss, is pale in colour with dark stripes.

The landscape of the Muir of Dinnet has been heavily influenced by the movement and subsequent melting of ice during periods of glaciation; at times the area was covered by ice sheets up to one kilometre thick. The climate warmed rapidly at the end of the last ice age, following which huge quantities of water were released, washing silts, sands, gravels and rocks across the landscape, leading to the formation of many discernible glacial features across the Muir of Dinnet, including kettle hole lochs, kames and eskers. One of the most impressive features at the Muir of Dinnet is the gorge and giant pothole known as the Burn O'Vat (or simply 'the Vat'), which was carved when a meltwater river encountered an area of hard bedrock, leading to the formation of a whirlpool.

== Flora and fauna ==
The variety of habitats at Muir of Dinnet culminate in an impressive range of wildlife and plant species being recorded at the reserve. Approximately 470 ha of the reserve is woodland, with birch dominating the lower ground and Scots pine forest on the higher slopes. Isolated examples of rowan, willow, alder, and junipers are also found, along with 4.5 ha of aspen woodland. This woodland, which lies between Old and New Kinord, is one of the largest stands of aspen in Scotland, and supports Scotland's largest population of the rare aspen bristle-moss, as well as rare fungi such as aspen bracket fungus and Junghuhnia nitida. Dry heathland consisting chiefly of heather and bearberry covers 42 ha of the reserve; this habitat also supports plant species such as intermediate wintergreen, petty whin and stone bramble as well as over 30 species of Cladonia lichen. There are also two areas of raised bog, which support plants such as sedges and many species of sphagnum moss.

140 bird species have been recorded at the Muir of Dinnet, 13 of which are United Kingdom Biodiversity Action Plan (UKBAP) species. The lochs of the reserve are of international importance for wintering wildfowl including whooper swans, goldeneye, wigeon, teal, mallard and tufted duck. Large numbers of Icelandic greylag geese also historically overwintered at Muir of Dinnet, however since 2000 a trend for milder winters has led to these birds no longer travelling as far south, and numbers have declined dramatically whilst numbers at more northerly locations have increased. Of the overwintering species, mallards, teals, tufted ducks, wigeons, greylag geese, mute swans and goldeneyes remain at Muir of Dinnet to breed, being joined by other breeding species such as moorhen, water rail, sedge warbler and reed bunting. There are also summer migrants, with common redstart, willow warblers and tree pipits nesting and feeding in the woods, and curlew, skylark and meadow pipit found on the heaths.

Otters are also regularly seen at Muir of Dinnet NNR, along with seven other UKBAP mammal species, such as red squirrels and pipistrelle, Daubenton's and brown long-eared bats. The reserve is also important for invertebrates, especially moths and water beetles, with at least 349 species of moth having been recorded here.

== History ==
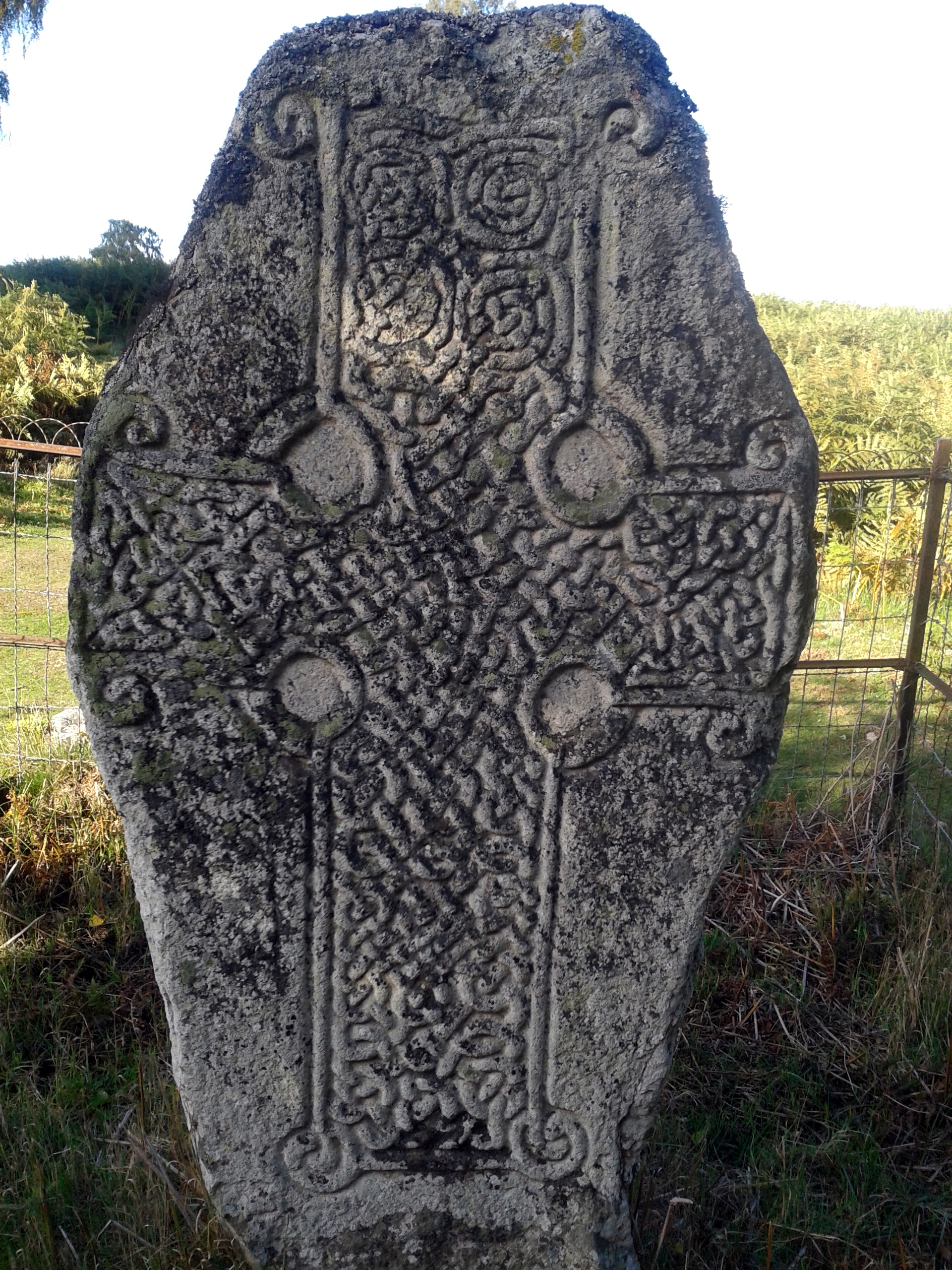
Loch Kinord cross slab

The Muir of Dinnet has been inhabited since Mesolithic times, and archaeological remains have been found throughout the area. During the Iron Age a crannog was built on Loch Kinord, and this continued to be used through to the 10th century; a logboat has been found on the bed of the loch just offshore. A 9th-century Pictish stone stands on the north shore of the loch. The remains of a medieval moated homestead can be seen on the north shore of Loch Davan. This building, known as The Heugh, is thought to have been the headquarters of Andrew Moray during the Battle of Culblean in 1335. During the 17th century the Burn O'Vat was used as a hide-out by cattle-rustler Gilderoy Macgregor before he was caught and hanged in 1658.

Loch Kinord was partially drained during the early 19th century, leading to level of the loch being lowered by about 1 metre. In 1888 Loch Kinord was further altered in order to provide hydro-electric power for Dinnet House. In 1949 the Muir of Dinnet was identified as a potential national nature reserve by the Scottish Wildlife Conservation Committee, however this was not acted upon at the time. During the early 1970s it was suggested that the area be made a country park, however the area was instead designated as a Site of Special Scientific Interest in 1971. In 1977 the Muir of Dinnet became a national nature reserve as part of the celebrations surrounding the Silver Jubilee of Queen Elizabeth.

Six Striped Rustic, a film which heavily features Muir of Dinnet, was made in 2013 by artist Chris Dooks. It was commissioned by Woodend Barn Arts in Banchory as part of their Atomic Doric season of cultural works about the area.

== Conservation designations ==
In addition to being a national nature reserve Muir of Dinnet holds a number of other designations for its important natural heritage interests. Loch Kinord and Loch Davan are designated as a Special Protection Area (SPA), as well as being a Ramsar site. Two Special Areas of Conservation (SACs), including the Muir of Dinnet SAC and the River Dee SAC also overlap the reserve. The reserve also forms part of the Muir of Dinnet Site of Special Scientific Interest, and includes three scheduled monuments and one Geological Conservation Review site. The national nature reserve is classified as a Category II protected area by the International Union for Conservation of Nature.
