= Logie Coldstone =

Coordinates: 57°7′36″N 2°56′7″W

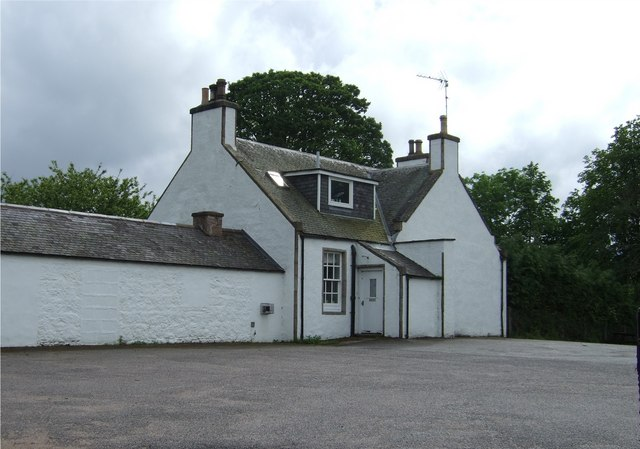
Logie Coldstone School

Logie Coldstone (Scottish Gaelic: Lògaidh) is a village in Aberdeenshire, Scotland. The village lies north of the River Dee, near Tarland in the Cromar, a basin of land cut out of the Grampian foothills between Aboyne and Ballater.

== See also ==
- Royal Deeside
- Blelack
