= Junghuhnia glabricystidia =

Scientific classification
- Domain: Eukaryota
- Kingdom: Fungi
- Division: Basidiomycota
- Class: Agaricomycetes
- Order: Polyporales
- Family: Steccherinaceae
- Genus: Junghuhnia
- Species: J. glabricystidia

Binomial name
- Junghuhnia glabricystidia Ipulet & Ryvarden 2005

Species of fungus

Junghuhnia glabricystidia is a species of crust fungus in the family Steccherinaceae. The type specimen was collected in Kibale National Park, western Uganda, growing on a rotting hardwood log. The crust-like fruit bodies of the fungus measure up to 1 cm wide, 3 cm long, and 3 mm thick. The pore surface is white to cream, with round pores numbering 4 to 5 per millimetre. The tube layer, which is the same colour as the pore surface, is up to 2 mm deep, with a 1-mm thick subiculum. Its ellipsoid spores measure 4–5 by 3–3.5 μm. The fungus was described as new to science in 2005 by mycologists Perpetua Ipulet & Leif Ryvarden.
