= Junghuhnia kotlabae =

Scientific classification
- Kingdom: Fungi
- Division: Basidiomycota
- Class: Agaricomycetes
- Order: Polyporales
- Family: Steccherinaceae
- Genus: Junghuhnia
- Species: J. kotlabae

Binomial name
- Junghuhnia kotlabae Pouzar (2003)

Species of fungus

Junghuhnia kotlabae is a species of crust fungus in the family Steccherinaceae. It was described as a new species by Czech mycologist Zdenek Pouzar in 2003. The fungus, found in Cuba, was collected from a fallen stem of the Cuban royal palm (Roystonea regia). Distinguishing characteristics include the effuso-reflexed fruit bodies (mostly crust-like but with caps forming along the upper edge), broad spores, and two types of cystidia.
