= Junghuhnia chlamydospora =

Scientific classification
- Domain: Eukaryota
- Kingdom: Fungi
- Division: Basidiomycota
- Class: Agaricomycetes
- Order: Polyporales
- Family: Steccherinaceae
- Genus: Junghuhnia
- Species: J. chlamydospora

Binomial name
- Junghuhnia chlamydospora Ryvarden (2007)

Species of fungus

Junghuhnia chlamydospora is a species of poroid crust fungus in the family Steccherinaceae. The type specimen was collected in the Cockscomb Basin Wildlife Sanctuary in Belize, growing on a dead standing tree. The crust-like fruit bodies of the fungus measure up to 2 millimetres (0.079 in) thick and have an ochraceous margin. The pore surface is yellowish to discoloured when fresh, later becoming blackish in parts when dry. The angular pores number 2 to 3 per millimetre. The tube layer, which is the same colour as the pore surface, is up to 3 millimetres (0.12 in) deep. Its cylindrical spores measure 4–4.5 by 1.5–2 μm. It has finely encrusted skeletal hyphae, similar to the related Saint Lucian fungus J. carneola. The abundant chlamydospores, for which J. chlamydospora is named, measure 8–12 by 4–6 μm and are strongly dextrinoid. The fungus was described as new to science in 2007 by mycologist Leif Ryvarden.
