= Junghuhnia globospora =

Scientific classification
- Domain: Eukaryota
- Kingdom: Fungi
- Division: Basidiomycota
- Class: Agaricomycetes
- Order: Polyporales
- Family: Steccherinaceae
- Genus: Junghuhnia
- Species: J. globospora

Binomial name
- Junghuhnia globospora Iturr. & Ryvarden (2010)

Species of fungus

Junghuhnia globospora is a species of poroid fungus in the family Steccherinaceae. Found in the Andes region of Venezuela, it was described as a new species in 2010 by mycologists Teresa Iturriaga and Leif Ryvarden.
