= Loch Kinord =

Lake in Aberdeenshire, Scotland

- Loch Kinnord, Loch Ceander, Loch Cannor
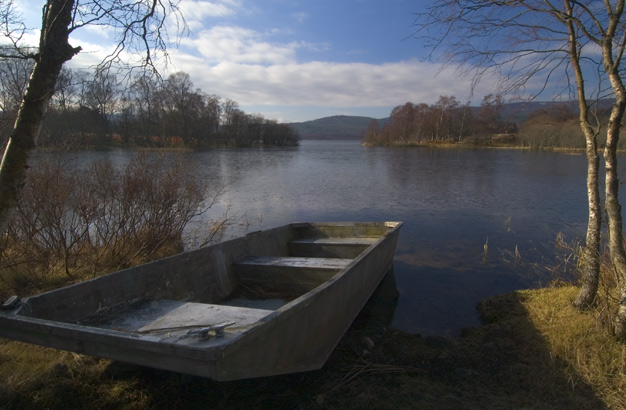

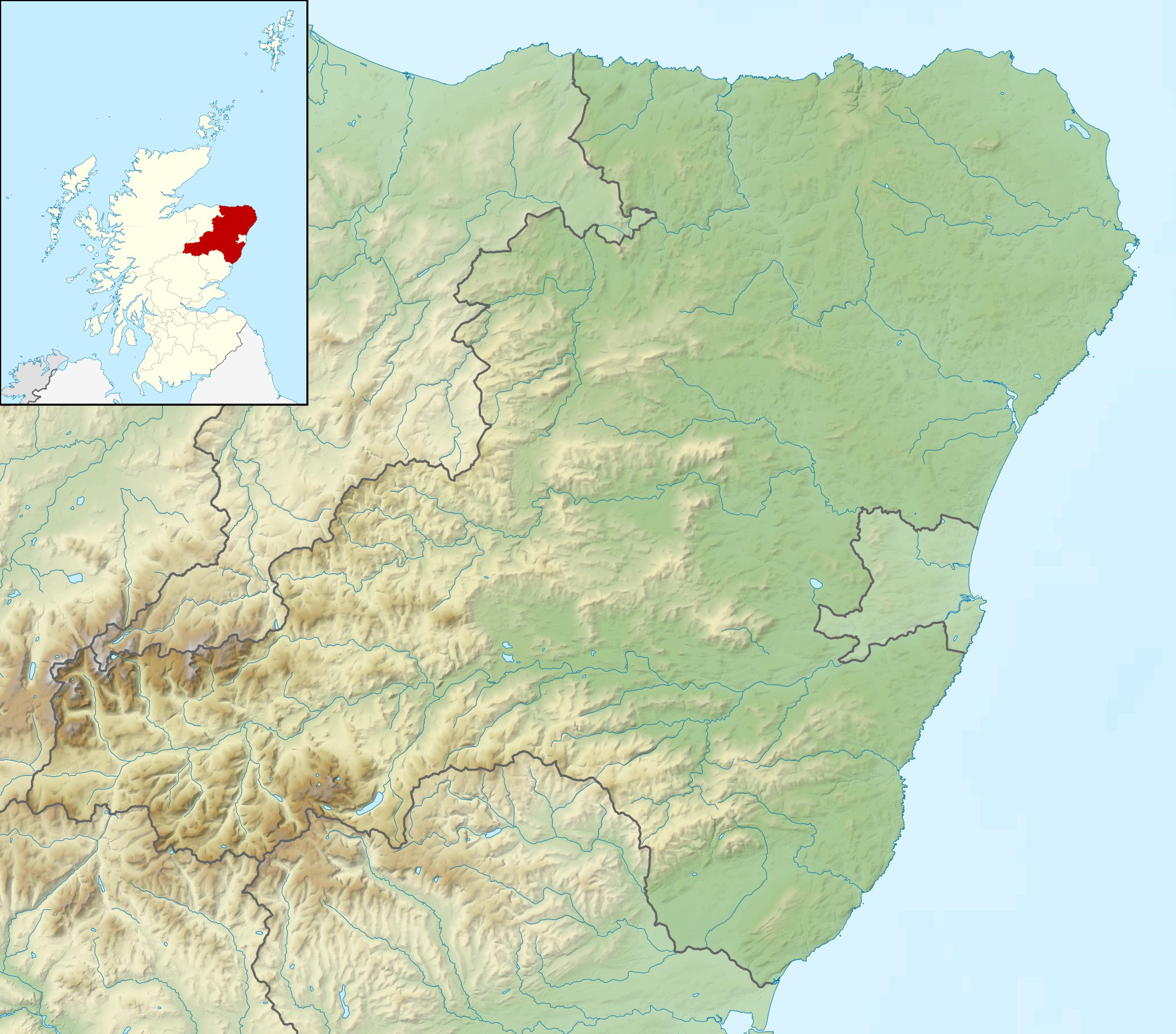
- Location within Aberdeenshire
- Location: Aberdeenshire, Scotland
- Coordinates: 57°4′54″N 2°55′22″W
- Type: freshwater loch
- Primary inflows: Vat Burn
- Primary outflows: River Dee
- Basin countries: Scotland
- Max. length: 1 mi (1.6 km)
- Max. width: 0.25 mi (0.40 km)
- Surface area: 76.9 ha (190 acres)
- Average depth: 5 ft (1.5 m)
- Max. depth: 12 ft (3.7 m)
- Water volume: 41,000,000 ft^{3} (1,200,000 m^{3})
- Shore length^{1}: 7.1 km (4.4 mi)
- Surface elevation: 167 m (548 ft)
- Islands: 7
- ^{1} Shore length is not a well-defined measure.

Loch Kinord is a small, freshwater loch at Muir of Dinnet, Aberdeenshire, Scotland just north of the River Dee and 5 mi (8 km) east of Ballater. The loch is also known as Loch Ceander and Loch Cannor. It is approximately 1 mi (1.6 km) in length and was formed from a glacial kettle hole. The loch sits within the Muir of Dinnet National Nature Reserve and is immediately south of Loch Davan.

It contains several islets, as noted in a 19th-century book giving a brief description of the loch, and is forested with birch trees.

== Flora and fauna ==
Due to its shallowness, light penetrates to the loch floor. Consequently, many species of aquatic plants exist including water lobelia, quillwort and shoreweed. In the summer white water lilies bloom on the loch. Around the perimeter reeds, sedges, horsetails, bulrushes and willow scrub are found and a European beech forest fringes the edge. The loch is also home to pike, otters, goldeneyes, migrating geese and other wildfowl.Cormorants have also been spotted nesting on one of the islets near the loch's shore.

== Archaeology and history ==
An Iron Age crannog was built on the loch, probably for defensive purposes. Oak tree trunks were driven into the loch bed and stones built up around them. A hut was then built on top of the structure. One of the remaining crannogs can be seen as a small island covered with trees.

On the north shore stands a 9th-century, cross slab Pictish stone called Kinord Cross. It is carved with intricate knot work and indicates that there may have been a small monastery or chapel located nearby. At some point in history, the cross was lost and buried; however it was dug up again in the 1820s and erected at Aboyne Castle. In 1959 it was returned to its current location.

During the period when the Romans were in Britain (80 - 399 CE) a fort was built on the southern promontory in response to rumours of a Roman invasion.

The castle, which used to stand on one of the islets, was first known to have been recorded as a refuge and hunting lodge for the Earl of Atholl after the Battle of Culblean in 1335.

There have been archaeological finds at the loch including a medieval bronze jug.

A history of the loch was published by the Reverend John Grant Michie in 1877 and has been reprinted on at least two occasions.

== Recreation ==
There is a circular walking route around the loch with vantage points for bird watching and wildlife spotting. The starting point for the walk is Burn O'Vat car park on the Ballater to Aboyne road.

Since 2009 the Kinord Hall Committee has organised a 10 kilometre run around the loch. The first race was held on Saturday 24 October 2009.

Six Striped Rustic - a film which heavily features the loch by artist Chris Dooks was made in 2013, commissioned by Woodend Barn Arts in Banchory as part of their Atomic Doric season of cultural works about the area.

== Survey ==
The loch was surveyed on 10 July 1905 by T.N. Johnston and L.W. Collett and later charted as part of the Sir John Murray's Bathymetrical Survey of Fresh-Water Lochs of Scotland 1897-1909.
