= Junghuhnia japonica =

Scientific classification
- Domain: Eukaryota
- Kingdom: Fungi
- Division: Basidiomycota
- Class: Agaricomycetes
- Order: Polyporales
- Family: Steccherinaceae
- Genus: Junghuhnia
- Species: J. japonica

Binomial name
- Junghuhnia japonica Núñez & Ryvarden (2005)

Species of fungus

Junghuhnia japonica is a species of poroid crust fungus in the family Steccherinaceae. The type specimen was collected in Ōkuchi, Japan, growing on a rotting log of Castanopsis. The fungus is only known from the type locality. Its cylindric spores measure 4–5 by 2–2.4 μm and are smooth and hyaline. J. japonica has two types of cystidia. One type is thick walled and heavily encrusted, measuring 40–70 by 9–15 μm. The other type is tubular, smooth, and thin walled, measuring 20–35 by 4–8 μm. The latter type, which have an oily or granular appearance under the microscope, are known as gloeocystidia.

The fungus was described as new to science in 1999 by mycologists Maria Núñez & Leif Ryvarden. J. japonica is similar in morphology to J. luteoalba but that species has narrower spores and lacks gloeocystidia.
