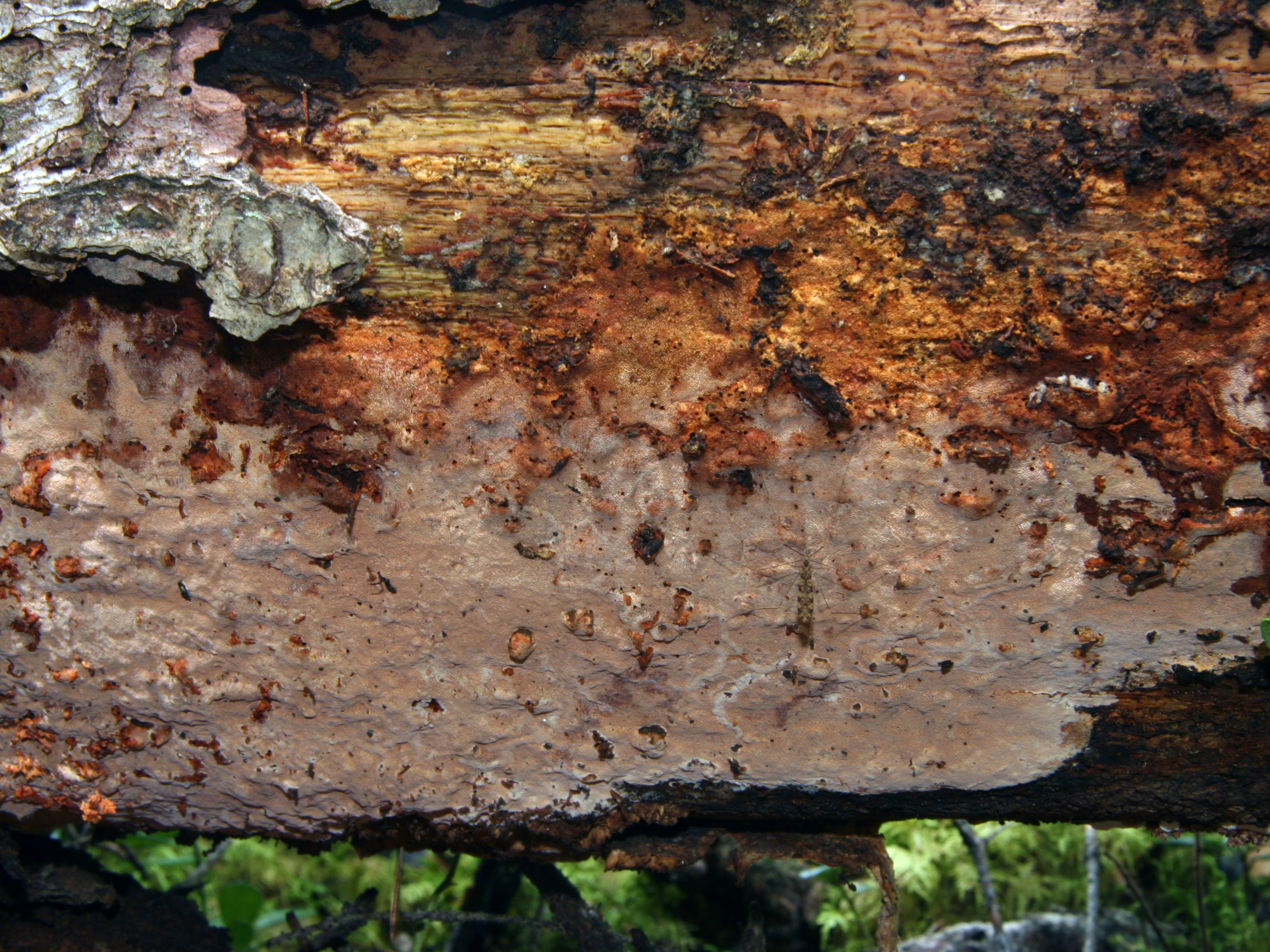

Scientific classification
- Domain: Eukaryota
- Kingdom: Fungi
- Division: Basidiomycota
- Class: Agaricomycetes
- Order: Polyporales
- Family: Steccherinaceae
- Genus: Junghuhnia
- Species: J. collabens

Binomial name
- Junghuhnia collabens (Fr.) Ryvarden

= Junghuhnia collabens =

Species of fungus

Junghuhnia collabens is a species of fungus belonging to the family Steccherinaceae.

It has cosmopolitan distribution.
