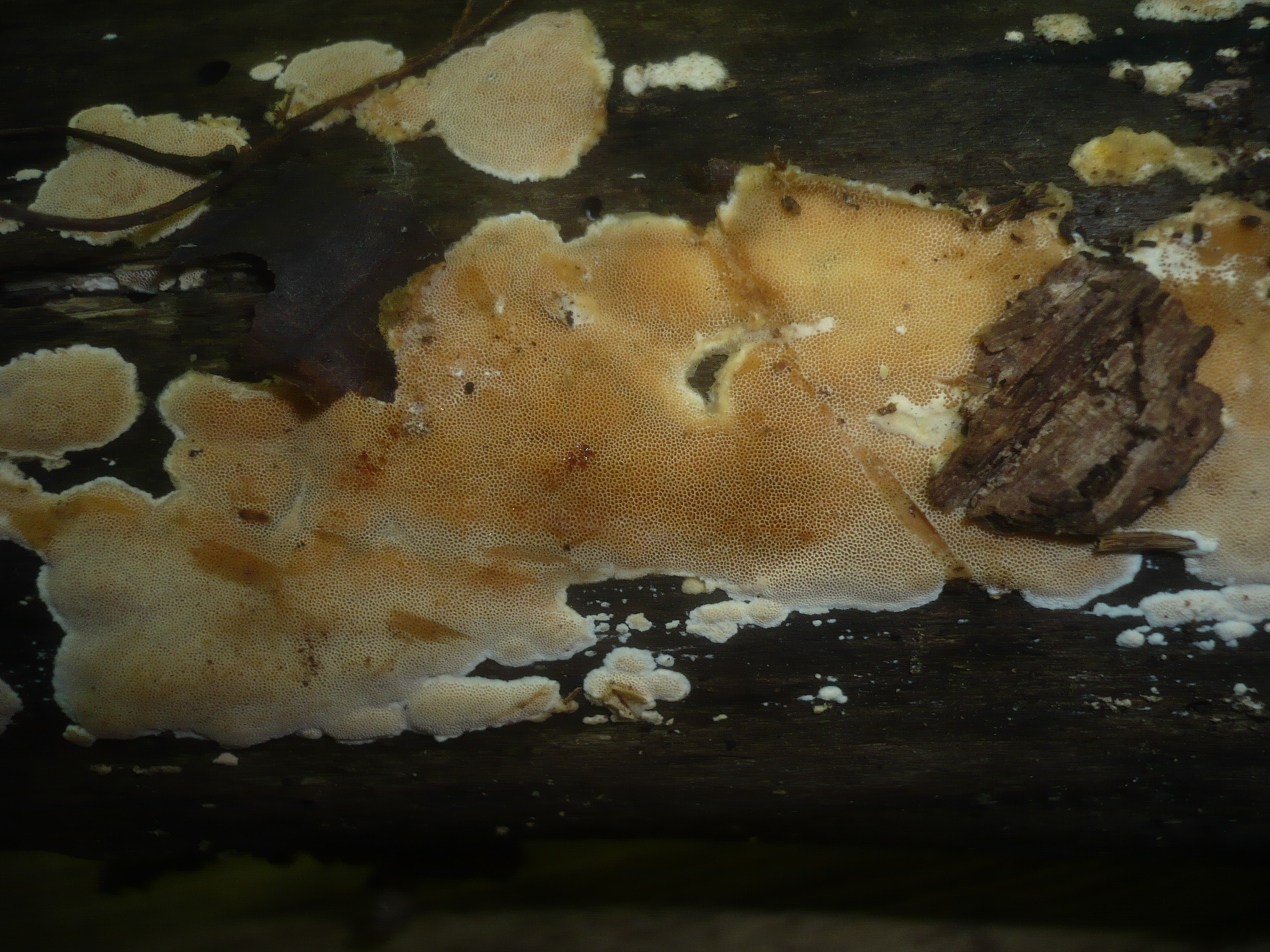
- Junghuhnia nitida

Scientific classification
- Kingdom: Fungi
- Division: Basidiomycota
- Class: Agaricomycetes
- Order: Polyporales
- Family: Steccherinaceae
- Genus: Junghuhnia; Corda (1842)

Type species
- Junghuhnia crustacea (Jungh.) Ryvarden (1972)

Synonyms
- Laschia Jungh. (1838); Aschersonia Endl. (1842)

= Junghuhnia =

Genus of fungi

Junghuhnia is a genus of crust fungi in the family Steccherinaceae (formerly placed in the family Meruliaceae). It was circumscribed by Czech mycologist August Carl Joseph Corda in 1842. The generic name honours German-Dutch botanist Franz Wilhelm Junghuhn.

== Description ==
The fruit bodies of Junghuhnia species are crust-like (rarely with a cap). They have a dimitic hyphal system and encrusted cystidia. Their spores are obovoid (egg-shaped) to cylindrical.

== Species ==
As of June 2017, Index Fungorum accepts 36 species in Junghuhnia:

- Junghuhnia africana Ipulet & Ryvarden (2005) – Uganda
- Junghuhnia aurantilaeta (Corner) Spirin (2007)
- Junghuhnia autumnale Spirin, Zmitr. & Malysheva (2007)
- Junghuhnia carneola (Bres.) Rajchenb. (1984) – St. Lucia
- Junghuhnia chlamydospora Ryvarden (2007) – Belize
- Junghuhnia collabens (Fr.) Ryvarden (1972)
- Junghuhnia complicata Blumenf. & J.E.Wright (1984)
- Junghuhnia conchiformis X.L.Zeng & Ryvarden (1992)
- Junghuhnia crustacea (Jungh.) Ryvarden (1972) – Africa
- Junghuhnia fimbriatella (Peck) Ryvarden (1972)
- Junghuhnia flabellata H.S.Yuan & Y.C.Dai (2012) – China
- Junghuhnia glabricystidia Ipulet & Ryvarden (2005)
- Junghuhnia globospora Iturr. & Ryvarden (2010) – Brazil; Venezuela
- Junghuhnia imbricata Spirin (2007)
- Junghuhnia japonica Núñez & Ryvarden (1999) – Japan
- Junghuhnia kotlabae Pouzar (2003)
- Junghuhnia luteoalba (P.Karst.) Ryvarden (1972)
- Junghuhnia meridionalis (Rajchenb.) Rajchenb. (2003)
- Junghuhnia micropora Spirin, Zmitr. & Malysheva (2007)
- Junghuhnia minor H.S.Yuan (2011)
- Junghuhnia minuta I.Lindblad & Ryvarden (1999) – Costa Rica
- Junghuhnia neotropica I.Lindblad & Ryvarden (1999) – Costa Rica
- Junghuhnia nitida (Pers.) Ryvarden (1972) – Asia; Africa; Europe
- Junghuhnia polycystidifera (Rick) Rajchenb. (1987)
- Junghuhnia pseudominuta H.S.Yuan & Y.C.Dai (2008)
- Junghuhnia pseudozilingiana (Parmasto) Ryvarden (1972)
- Junghuhnia rhizomorpha H.S.Yuan & Y.C.Dai (2008) – China
- Junghuhnia semisupiniformis (Murrill) Ryvarden (1985) – Brazil; Mexico; Europe (Italy, France, Germany); Caribbean
- Junghuhnia subfimbriata (Romell) Ginns (1984)
- Junghuhnia subnitida H.S.Yuan & Y.C.Dai (2008) – China
- Junghuhnia subundata (Murrill) Ryvarden (2014)
- Junghuhnia taiwaniana H.S.Yuan, Sheng H.Wu & Y.C.Dai (2012) – Taiwan
- Junghuhnia tropica H.S.Yuan, Sheng H.Wu & Y.C.Dai (2012)
- Junghuhnia undigera (Berk. & M.A.Curtis) Ryvarden (1984)
- Junghuhnia vitellina Spirin (2005)
- Junghuhnia zonata (Bres.) Ryvarden (1972)
