= Junghuhnia africana =

Scientific classification
- Domain: Eukaryota
- Kingdom: Fungi
- Division: Basidiomycota
- Class: Agaricomycetes
- Order: Polyporales
- Family: Steccherinaceae
- Genus: Junghuhnia
- Species: J. africana

Binomial name
- Junghuhnia africana Ipulet & Ryvarden 2005

Species of fungus

Junghuhnia africana is a species of crust fungus in the family Steccherinaceae. The type specimen was collected in Bwindi Impenetrable National Park, Uganda, growing on a rotting hardwood log. Its ellipsoid spores measure 5–6 by 4–4.5 μm. The fungus was described as new to science in 2005 by mycologists Perpetua Ipulet & Leif Ryvarden.
