= Blelack =

Place in Scotland

Coordinates: 57°07′12″N 2°55′41″W

Blelack (/ˈblɛlək/, Scottish Gaelic: Blàth Bholg) is a place in Aberdeenshire, Scotland, the location of Blelack House, a Scottish mansion house with origins in the seventeenth century.

Dool Dool to Blelack, and Dool to Blelack's Heir, for Driving use fae the Seely Howe to the Cauld Hill O’ Fare

So goes the apparent curse on the Laird of Blelack House for instigating an exorcism on the "Fairies" resident in the Seely Howe (the location of Blelack House), 'howe' being a hollow or glen. The Cauld ('Cold') Hill O’ Fare is near Banchory, some miles further down the Dee Valley. Dool is the Doric dialect term roughly equivalent to 'Doom'. For a couple of centuries, the lairds did not seem to enjoy any particular good fortune, seemingly ending up always on the losing side.

Blelack House is situated 30 miles (48 km) west of Aberdeen, near the village of Logie Coldstone, 3 miles (4.8 km) north of the River Dee in the Cromar, a basin of agricultural land carved out of the Grampian foothills. Blelack is an anglicisation of the Gaelic Baile ailich meaning "village of the stone house". The prefix "Ble..." is found in the Outer Hebrides with regard to translations of Gaelic place names beginning Baile, in Ireland this would be "Bally..." .

The Royal Deeside area was historically within the Earldom of Mar, and the Blelack estate belonged to a branch of the powerful Clan Gordon. In 1620 an "Alexander Gordoune" of Blelack is referred to in "The Records of Aboyne", and the location is shown on a map of 1654. It is difficult to tell if the presence of a stone house here is earlier. Typical of such mansion houses, there is a nearby farm and a mill, both of similar age, and built of the distinctive local pink granite.

There are, confusingly, two dates engraved onto the façade of the building, 1881 and 1892. There is some evidence that the current Blelack House is older, and these are renovation dates. Blelack House was burnt down in retribution after the Jacobite rising of 1745. The young laird, Charles Gordon, fought for Bonnie Prince Charlie, and was closely associated with several of the rebellion's leaders. The new mansion house was built on the present site in 1753. The building suffered an accidental fire later in 1868 and was rebuilt and remodelled the following year. We can only speculate on the extent of the changes to the house over the centuries; the current building seems to predate the Mock Baronial style of the later nineteenth century. During the Victorian era, Blelack ceased to be the laird's seat and was used as a shooting lodge. In World War II pupils from Albyn School for girls in Aberdeen were evacuated to the house. The building was split up into separate flats in 1976.

== Images ==
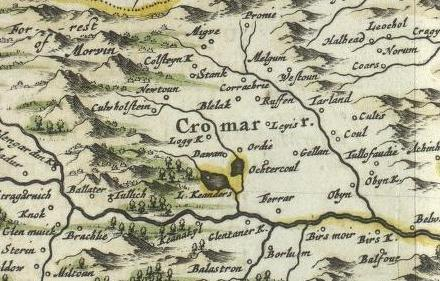
Blelak or Blelack 1654

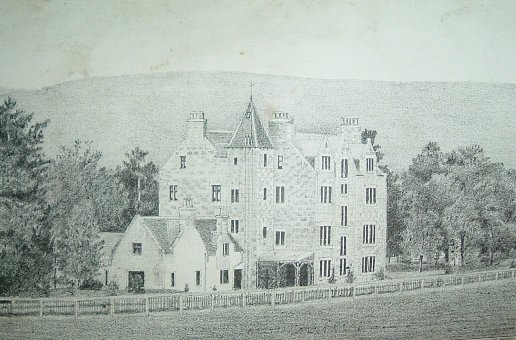
Blelack 1896

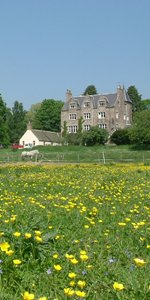
Summer 2006
