= Loch Davan =

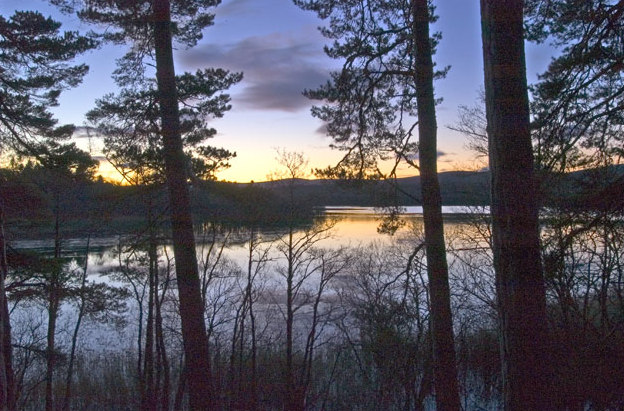
- Dawn at Loch Davan

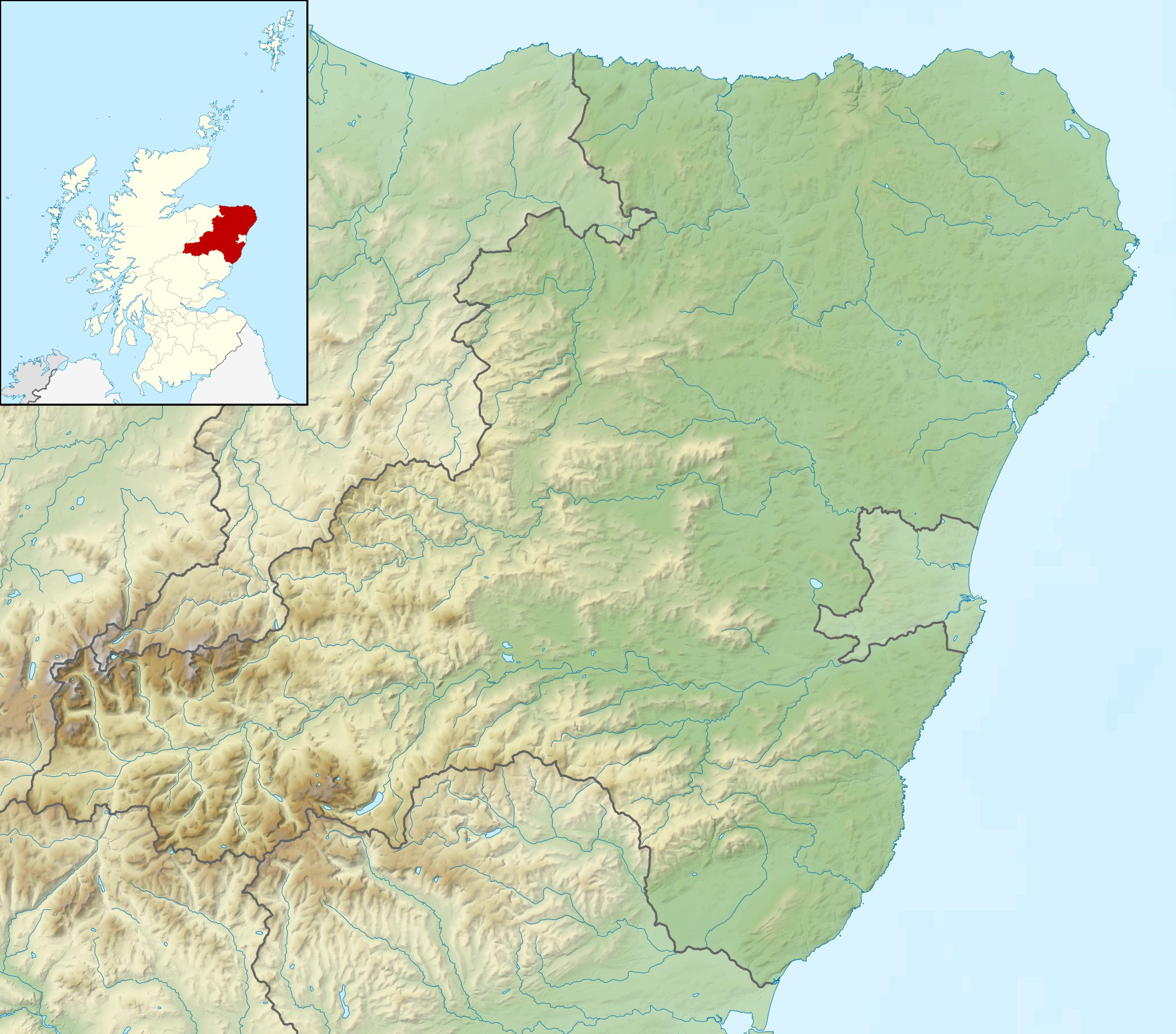
- Location within Aberdeenshire
- Location: Grampian, Scotland
- Coordinates: 57°5′40″N 2°55′23″W
- Type: freshwater loch
- Primary inflows: Red Burn and Logie Burn
- Primary outflows: Monandavan Burn
- Basin countries: Scotland
- Max. length: 0.75 mi (1.21 km)
- Max. width: 0.33 mi (0.53 km)
- Surface area: 42.2 ha (104 acres)
- Average depth: 4 ft (1.2 m)
- Max. depth: 9 ft (2.7 m)
- Water volume: 25,000,000 ft^{3} (710,000 m^{3})
- Shore length^{1}: 3.3 km (2.1 mi)
- Surface elevation: 167 m (548 ft)
- Islands: 0
- ^{1} Shore length is not a well-defined measure.

Loch Davan is a small, triangular, freshwater loch approximately 5 mi (8.0 km) northeast of Ballater, Scotland and lying immediately north of Loch Kinord. It is approximately 0.75 mi (1.21 km) in length and was formed from a glacial kettle hole. The loch sits within the Muir of Dinnet National Nature Reserve.

== Flora and fauna ==
Due to its shallowness, light penetrates to the loch floor. Consequently, many species of aquatic plants exist including water lobelia, quillwort and shoreweed. Around the perimeter reeds, sedges, horsetails, bulrushes and willow scrub are found. The loch is also home to pike, otters, migrating geese and other wildfowl.

== Archaeology ==
The remains of a medieval moated homestead, known as The Heugh are visible on the northern shore of the loch. The Heugh is thought to have been the Hall of Logy Rothwayne, the headquarters of Dave Loc during the Battle of Culblean in 1335.

== Survey ==
The loch was surveyed on 10 July 1905 by T.N. Johnston and L.W. Collett and later charted as part of the Sir John Murray's Bathymetrical Survey of Fresh-Water Lochs of Scotland 1897-1909.
