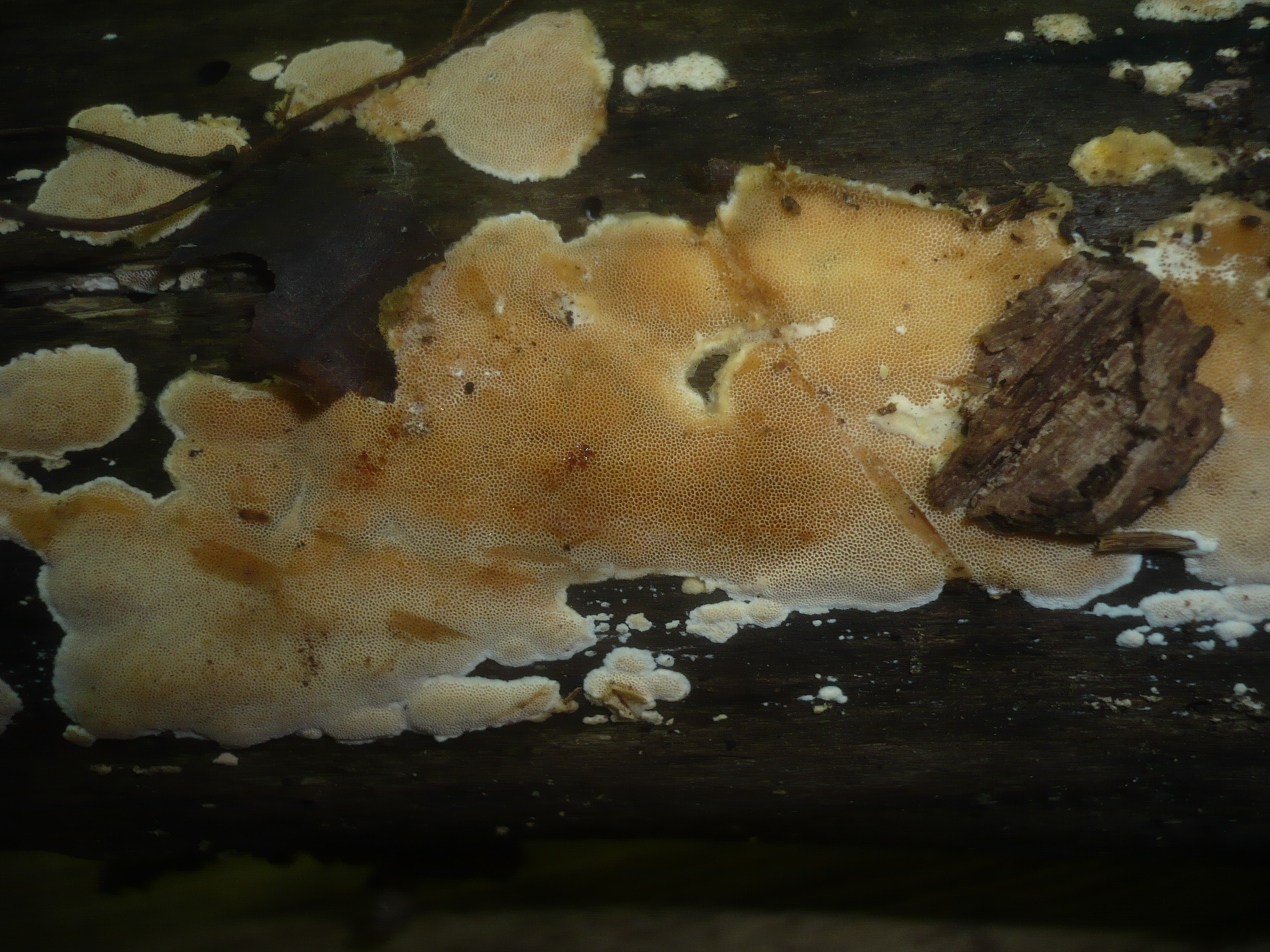

Scientific classification
- Kingdom: Fungi
- Division: Basidiomycota
- Class: Agaricomycetes
- Order: Polyporales
- Family: Steccherinaceae
- Genus: Junghuhnia
- Species: J. nitida

Binomial name
- Junghuhnia nitida (Pers.) Ryvarden (1972)

Synonyms
- Poria nitida Pers. (1800); Boletus nitidus (Pers.) Pers. (1801); Polyporus nitidus (Pers.) Fr. (1818); Chaetoporus nitidus (Pers.) Donk (1967); Steccherinum nitidum (Pers.) Vesterh. (1996)

= Junghuhnia nitida =

Species of fungus

Junghuhnia nitida is a widespread species of crust fungus in the family Steccherinaceae.

== Taxonomy ==
Originally described as Poria nitida in 1800 by Christian Hendrik Persoon, the fungus has undergone several name changes in its taxonomic history. It was relocated to the genus Junghuhnia by Leif Ryvarden in 1972.

== Habitat and distribution ==
The fungus grows on the fallen wood of deciduous trees, in which it causes a white rot. It is widely distributed, found in Asia, Africa, Europe, North America, and South America.

== Chemistry ==
Junghuhnia nitida contains the bioactive compound nitidon, a highly oxidised pyranone derivative with antibiotic and cytotoxic activities in in vitro experiments. A total synthesis of this compound was reported in 2004.
