= Gilderoy (outlaw) =

Scottish outlaw

Patrick McGregor
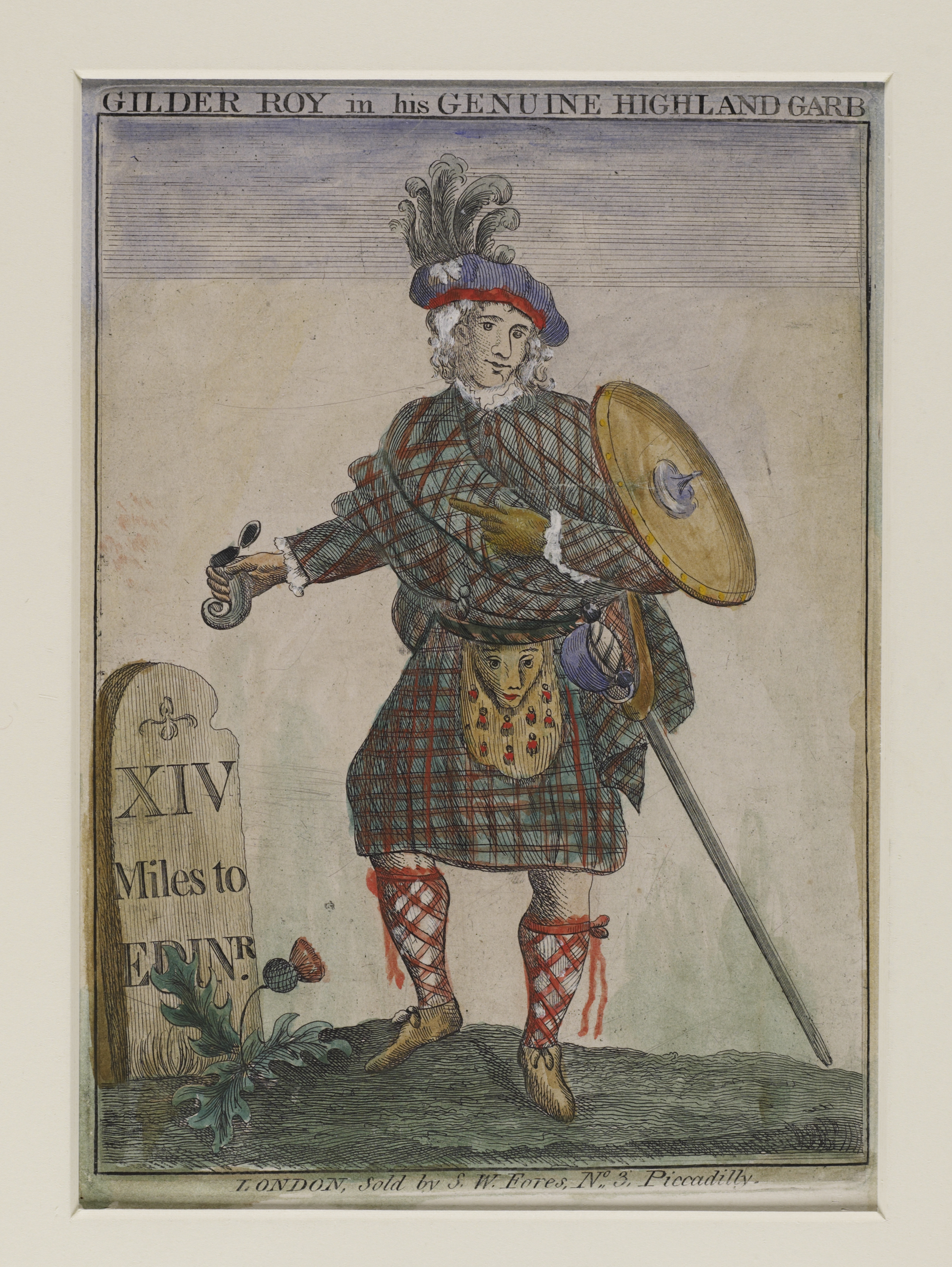
- An illustration of McGregor
- Born: Scotland
- Died: 1636; Edinburgh, Scotland

Patrick McGregor (Scottish Gaelic: Pàdraig MacGriogair d. 1636), better known as Gilderoy, was a Scottish outlaw and mass murderer who engaged in cattle raiding, blackmail and extortion in the regions of Strathspey, Braemar, Cromarty and other areas near Aberdeen during the Stuart period. After being caught by the Scottish authorities, he was executed in Edinburgh in 1636. McGregor has become a figure in Scottish folklore, including ballads, songs and idioms. His nickname has been alternatively rendered as Gilroy, Gilder Roy and Gilleroy.

== Life and character ==
Patrick McGregor aka Gilderoy was the leader of a band of limmers or robbers, also he was a murderer and a cattle thief (blackmailer). He is best known by the anglicised version of his nickname (Scottish Gaelic: Gille Ruadh), meaning 'the Red-haired Lad' for his characteristically Scottish red hair. He was also casually referred to as the 'Bonnie Lad' and is sometimes compared with other popular outlaws such as Robin Hood and also Rob Roy MacGregor who lived later (1671–1734) and with whom he is sometimes confused. The lowland Scots form 'Gilderoy' will be used throughout for consistency.

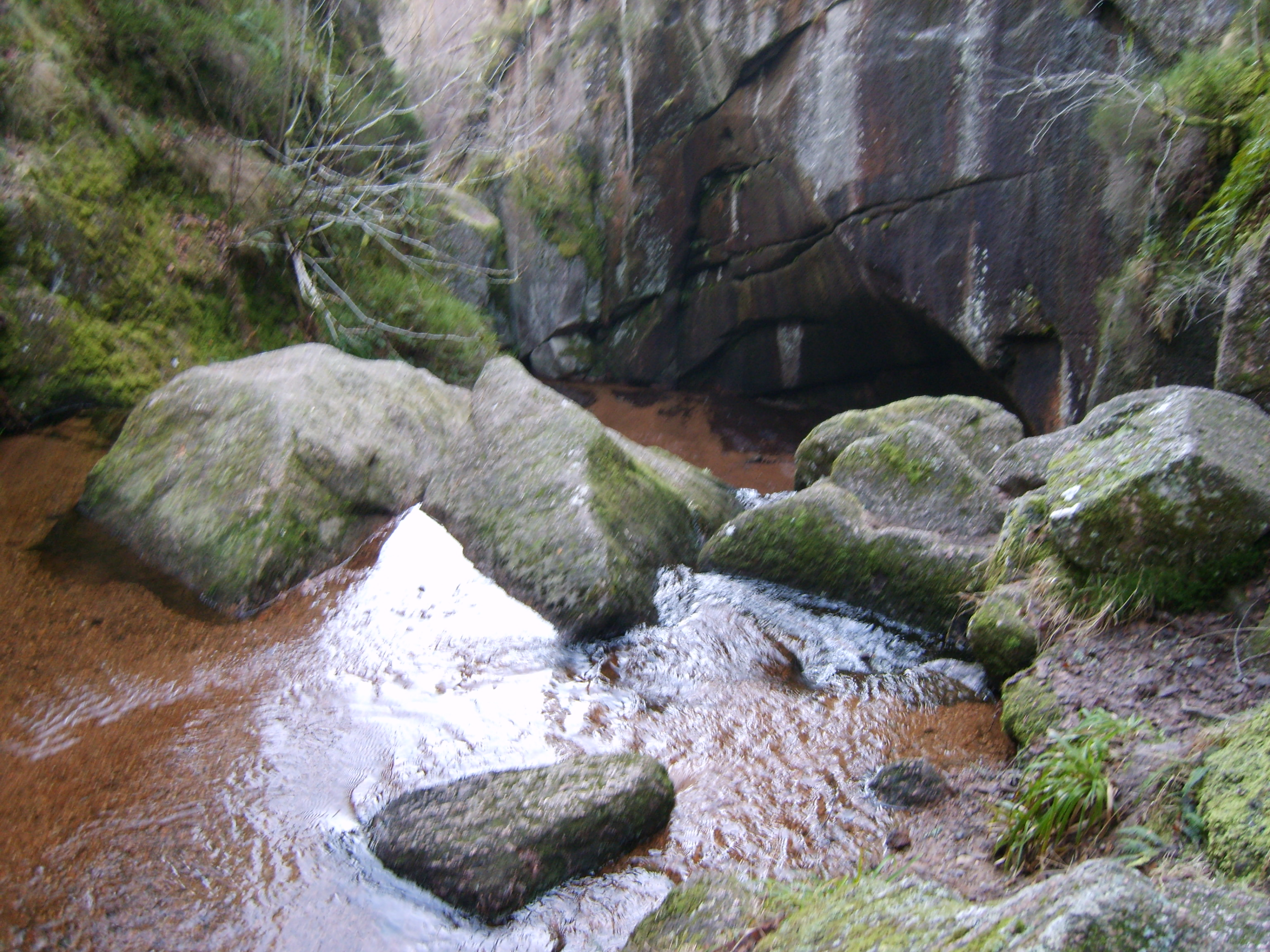
A view within the Burn o'Vat.

The spectacular rock formation at Burn o'Vat, near Ballater on Deeside is popularly associated as a hiding place of Rob Roy MacGregor, however it is some distance from his usual haunts and tradition says that it was used by Gilderoy, conceivably a relation of this better-known outlaw who was popularised by Walter Scott. A shallow depression behind the main waterfall here is known as "Gilderoy's Cave" as he is said on one occasion to have hidden from pursuers behind the waterfall when the burn was in spate. In June 1636 Sir James Grant of Freuchie and Sir Alexander Irvine of Drum and his wife Magdalene Scrimgeour were censured for harbouring him in their lands.

Gilderoy was executed in 1636; however, several highly adapted, greatly exaggerated and romanticised versions of his life have been published, some giving his year of death as late as 1658.

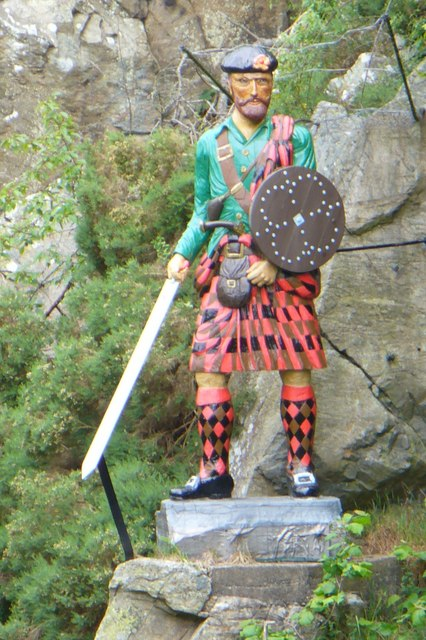
A statue of Rob Roy MacGregor located above the Culter Burn. Rob Roy may never or rarely have visited Aberdeenshire and historically the statue would best represent Gilderoy.

=== Details of the trial and his execution ===
Archibald, Lord Lorne, heritable justiciar of the South and North isles and the sheriffdom of Argyll had finally apprehended the "arch rebel" and on 7 June 1636 in Edinburgh the trial started of Patrick McGregor and his associates John Forbes, Alistair Forbes, Callum Forbes, George Grant, John McColme, John McGregor McEane, Gillespie McFarlane, Alistair McInneir and Ewin McGregor alias Accawisch.

The Scottish trial records list a number of his crimes such as "tressonable usurpatioun of our Souerane Lordis royal power and authoritie upone him, in cuming to the dwelling-hous of Alexander Hay in Caimecowlie, and thair, with his complices, breking up the durris thairof, pat violent handes in the persones of the said Alexander and his wyfe, tuik thame captives and prissoneris, caryeid thame as captives tua myles fra thair awin hous under silence of nycht, quhair they keipit the said Alexander and his wife captives the space of twa houris, and wald nocht set thame free quhill they pro meist thame ane sowme of money for thair ransome and libertie. Lykas, they staw, reft, and away tuik fra the said Alexander the haill guides and geir being within his houss, countit in wynter last, confessit be the said Patrik Gilroy in his depositiones."

The tenants of Sir Robert Innes of Balvenie suffered several visits from Gilderoy who used violence to steal food and drink from them. In 1635 he, with others, stole four hens from the householder of Culquharnie. William Dougat of Auchihove and some of his men were taken prisoner and demanded a ransom of two hundred merks. A considerable number of similar and other offences are recorded involving common folk, lairds and even ministers and much more seriously he was involved in a number of "crewall slauchters" or murders.

Gilderoy was found guilty and the dempster of the court pronounced the doom (verdict) of the court namely that Patrick McGregor on Friday 29 July was to be .."drawin backwardis upone upone ane cairt or hurle, fra the tolbuth or wairdhous, to the mercat cross of Edinburgh." Gilderoy, together with John Forbes had the distinction that they were to be hanged until dead on a gibbet that was considerably higher than that of their associates. Gilderoy and Forbes were also to have their "..heidis be strukin af from thair bodies, with their richt handis, and the said Gilroy his heid and richt hand to be affixit on the eist or netherbow poirt of Edinburgh, and the said John Forbes his heid and richt hand to be put upone the wast poirt thairof ."

His band of limmers (Scots for robbers) are recorded as having continued to ravage the country areas for some time after his execution.

== Popular versions of Gilderoy's life ==
Several popular versions of his life were published such as Lives and Exploits of English Highwayman, Pirates and Robbers. The time period of his activities is moved forward and his execution given as being in 1658 with various fantastical and highly exaggerated elements added. Gilderoy has been placed in the same category as Robin Hood, Twm Siôn Cati and the aforementioned Rob Roy McGregor.

Gilderoy is said to have come from a good family with an estate in Perthshire that he inherits at the age of twenty one upon his father's death. Despite advice from friends and relations he quickly bankrupts the estate by his recklessness. His mother eventually refuses him further funds and as a result he cuts her throat, rapes his sister and a servant following which he sets fire to her home having robbed her of all her remaining valuables.

A publication containing the song 'Gilderoy'.

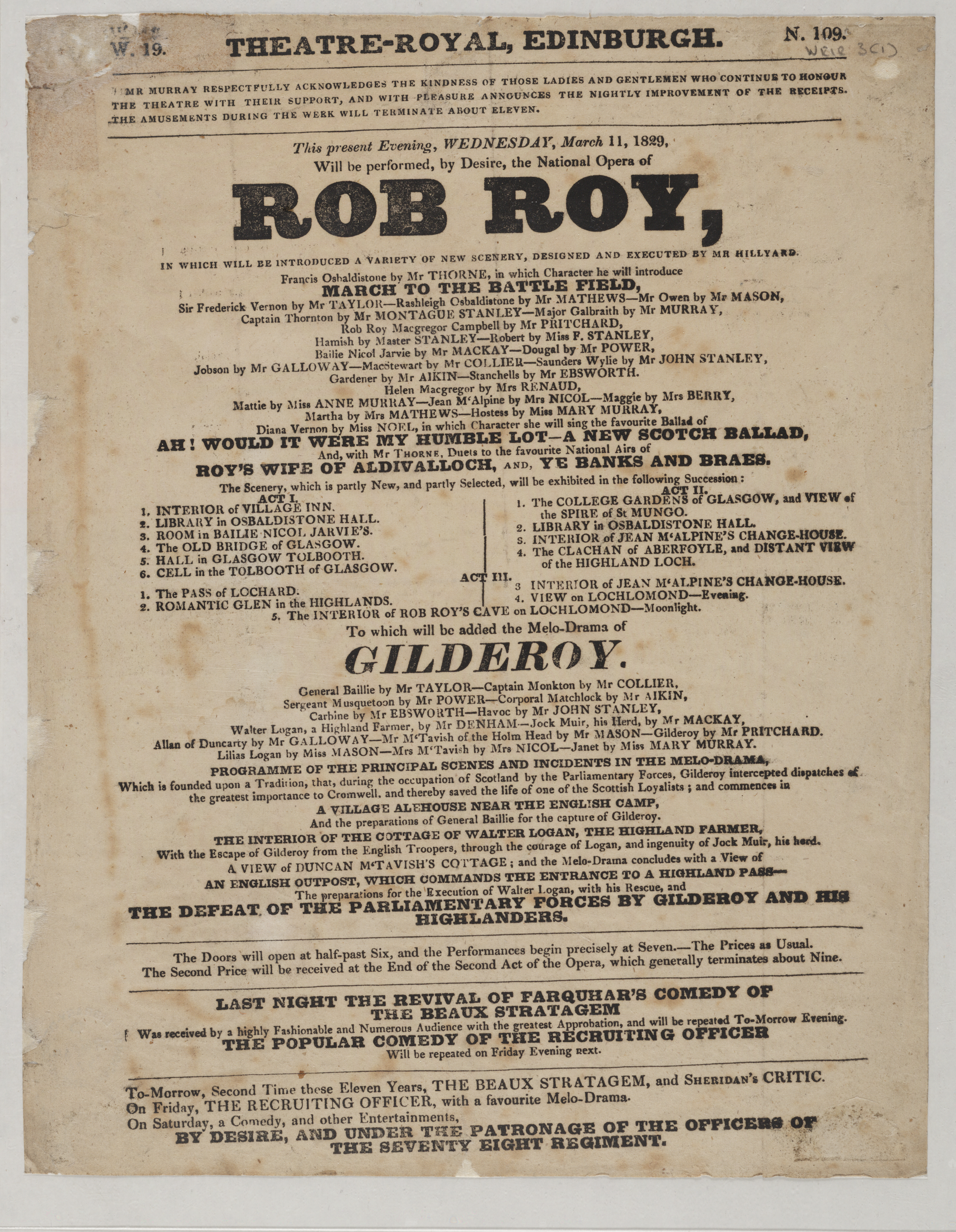
An advertising poster for the play 'Gilderoy'.

A considerable reward is offered for his capture and Gilderoy flees to France where he purchases fine clothes and finds himself one day in a cathedral near Paris where Cardinal Richelieu is preaching with the king in attendance. Gilderoy steals money from the cardinal's purse that he had left on his seat, the king spots his actions but Gilderoy gives a sign to indicate that it is a prank, the king later finding, to his great embarrassment, that he has been duped. Fleeing France he enters Spain, carrying out outrageous robberies wherever he goes. In Madrid he steals a great deal of valuable silver plate from the Duke of Medinaeceli.

After an absence of three years Gilderoy feels that it is safe to return to Scotland. Although Gilderoy was in fact executed in 1636 in these versions of his life he is said to have taken advantage of the confusion caused by the English Civil War (1642–1651) to gather together a band of brigands and to have terrorised people throughout the counties of Athol, Lochaber, Angus, Mar, Baquahan, Moray and Sutherland, demanding cattle from his victims to gain his protection, a practise known as blackmail. The Earl of Linlithgow is recorded a victim, Gilderoy stealing a diamond ring, a gold watch and eighty gold coins from him.

Oliver Cromwell is brought into the story, supposedly to cast a bad light on The Protectorate that was at the time of writing in power. Gilderoy is said to have discovered that Cromwell was passing through the wilds of Galloway after having landed at Portpatrick on his return from Ireland and decides to rob him. Although Cromwell has only two servants with him he opts to fight Gilderoy rather than submit to highway robbery, upon which Gilderoy opens fire and eventually pretends to flee and after a long chase suddenly halts, shoots and kills one of his pursuers, injures the other and shoots Cromwell's horse from under him, resulting in him breaking his leg. Gilderoy grants Cromwell his life, mounts him on an ass and sends him on his way.

Three of Gilderoy's men are next said to have been captured and hanged. In revenge he kidnaps the judge responsible, murders his servants, cuts up his coach, kills his horses and hangs him on the very same gibbet upon which his men still dangle. After carrying out many other atrocities a reward of 1000 marks is offered for his capture dead or alive. His mistress, Margaret Cunningham, decides to betray him as his days as a generous provider for her are clearly numbered. She arranges for forty soldiers to take him at her home, however she is not destined to benefit from her treachery as he murders her with much barbarity before managing to kill eight of the soldiers who eventually overwhelm him.

Gilderoy is securely chained by his hands, waist and feet and after three days so attired in the Edinburgh Tollbooth he is hung from a thirty foot high gibbet in April 1658 having expressed no remorse. His body, still hung in chains, is exhibited on another gibbet placed between Edinburgh and Leith as a dire warning to others. He is said to have been thirty-four years old at his death.

== Gilderoy remembered in poetry, music and song ==
Below is the first stanza from the 1783 publication of "Select Scotish Ballads by John Pinkerton showing that despite the harsh and brutal reality of Gilderoy's life he had a romantic appeal; the original is said to have been composed shortly after his execution by a young woman who unfortunately was attached to him. Miss Halket, later Lady Wardlaw, is known to have softened, expunged, and added, as necessity might require.

Gilderoy was a bonnie boy,
Had roses till his shoon,
His stockings were of silken soy,
Wi' garters hanging doun.
It was, I ween, a comelie sight
To see sae trim a boy;
He was my joy, and heart's delight,
My handsome Gilderoy.

A 'black letter' copy of around 1650 shows that it was popular in England at that time and in 1702 it also appeared in Playford's "Wit and Mirth." A black letter copy is a name used for the early form of type used by the printers that gave the appearance of a hand written manuscript. John Niven, a Jacobite sympathiser, transcribed in the 1760s the tune "The Flowers of Scotland – Gilderoy".

The tune Gilderoy also appears in Thomas D'Urfey's Pills to Purge Melancholy of 1707 and in Tea Table Miscellany of circa 1726. It also appeared in Orpheus Caledonius of 1733.

The Wordsworth Dictionary of Phrase and Fable of 1870 records the expression "To be hung higher than Gilderoy's kite", meaning to receive a punishment that is more severe than that usually meted out to even the most despicable of criminals!

Of Gilderoy sae fraid they were,
They bound him mickle strong,
Tull Edenburrow they led him thair,
And on a gallows hung;
They hung him high aboon the rest,
He was sae trim a boy...

One of the most recent supposed memorials to "Gilderoy" is that by Thomas Campbell (1777–1844) who wrote the ballad "Roslin Gilderoy", however this probably relates to a different person with the same nickname who in the eighteenth century was also hung in Edinburgh for stealing sheep, cattle, etc. This is the first stanza :-

The last, the fatal hour is come,,
That bears my love from me:
I hear the dead note of the drum,
I mark the gallows' tree!

== Micro-history ==
Robert Burns used a version of the melody Gilderoy for the song From Thee Eliza.

Ann Gilrye was the mother of the pioneer conservationist John Muir who was born in Scotland at Dunbar. Because of the association with her surname the family adopted 'Gilderoy' as their song as can be seen at the John Muir Museum in Dunbar.

Professor Gilderoy Lockhart is a celebrity author and Hogwarts' new Defense Against the Dark Arts teacher in Harry Potter and the Chamber of Secrets.

== See also ==
- Rob Roy McGregor
- Robin Hood
- Twm Siôn Cati
