= Burn o' Vat =

Valley in Aberdeenshire, Scotland

Coordinates: 57.084°N 2.951°W

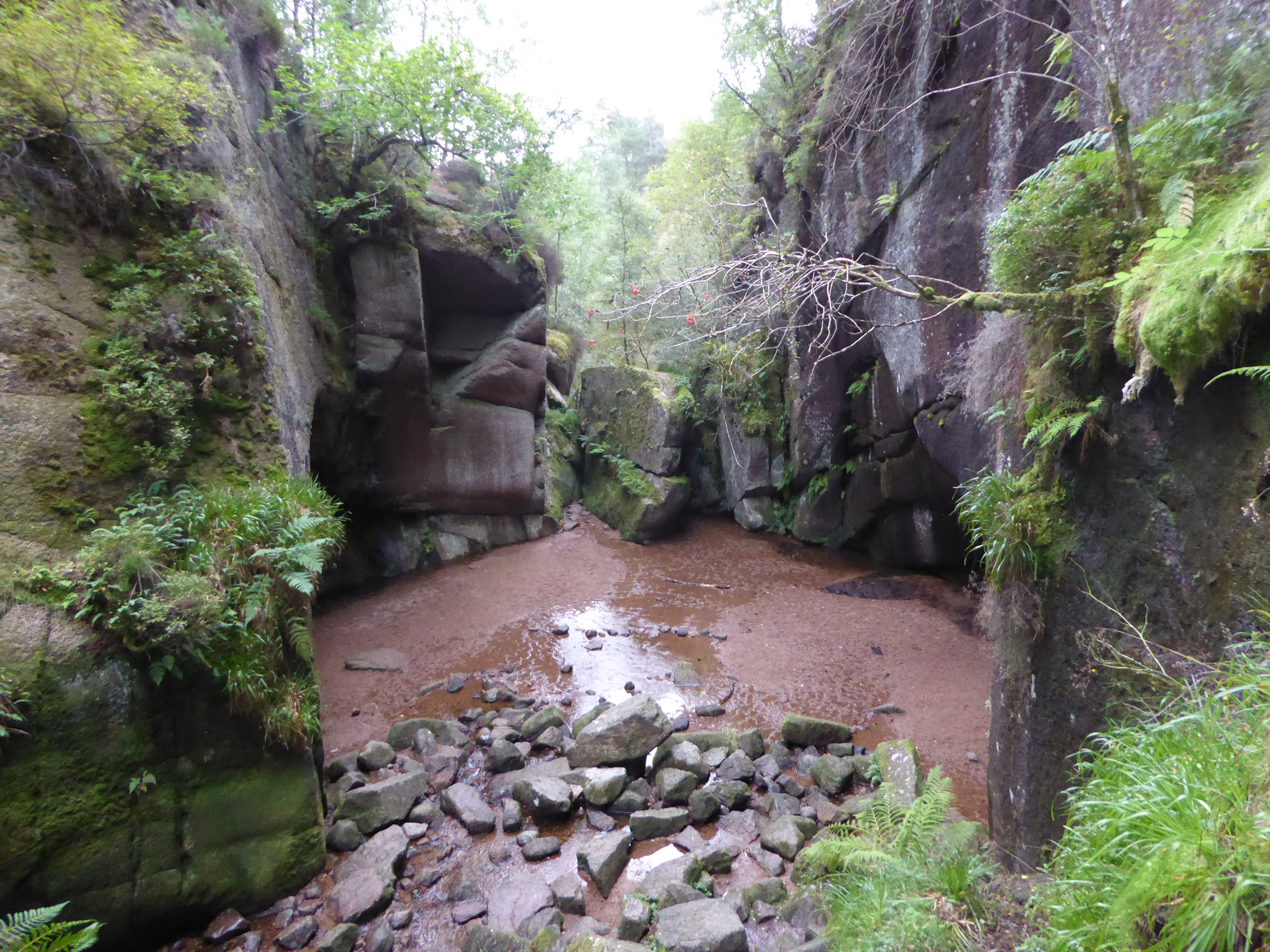
Overview of the Vat

The Burn o' Vat is a mountain stream in Deeside, Scotland, rising on Culblean Hill and flowing into Loch Kinord. It takes its name from "the Vat", a pothole of glacial origin that lies upon its course.

== Formation ==
Around 16,000 years ago, the area surrounding the Burn o' Vat was covered by a glacial ice sheet. As the area warmed around 14,000 years ago, the ice sheet began to melt, resulting in a torrent of meltwater that carried with it debris previously caught up in the glacial ice. This debris, consisting of rocks and boulders, is thought likely to be the most important component in the formation of The Vat. It is thought that a rock from the meltwater stream lodged in a small hollow on the river bed, causing the meltwater to flow around it in a spiralling motion. This spiralling motion caused the bed underneath the rock to erode over a long period of time, creating a feature known as a pothole.

Around 13,500 years ago the volume of meltwater decreased to such a level that the stream began to deposit more than it was eroding. This change resulted in the deposition of sand and gravel into the bottom of the pothole. It is believed that this sediment extends down around 5–7 metres, below the current ground level, though no-one can be certain of the true value. The pothole measures 18 metres across and 13 metres high, from present ground level.

Approximately 12,000 years ago, the entrance to the Vat was exposed when the rock in front of it was undercut by the same stream that formed the Vat, albeit in the form of a waterfall.

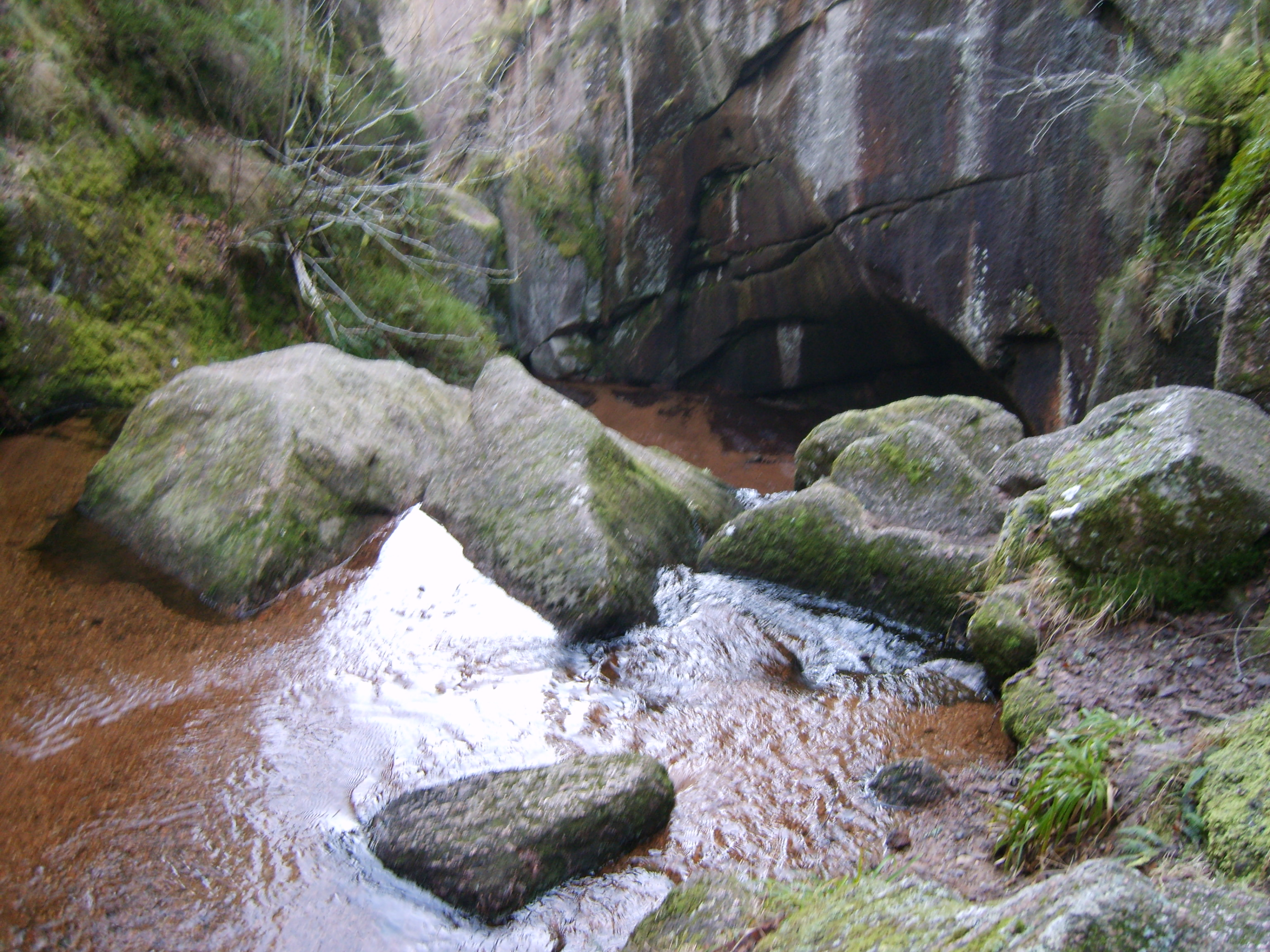
View from above the Vat, showing its bowl shape

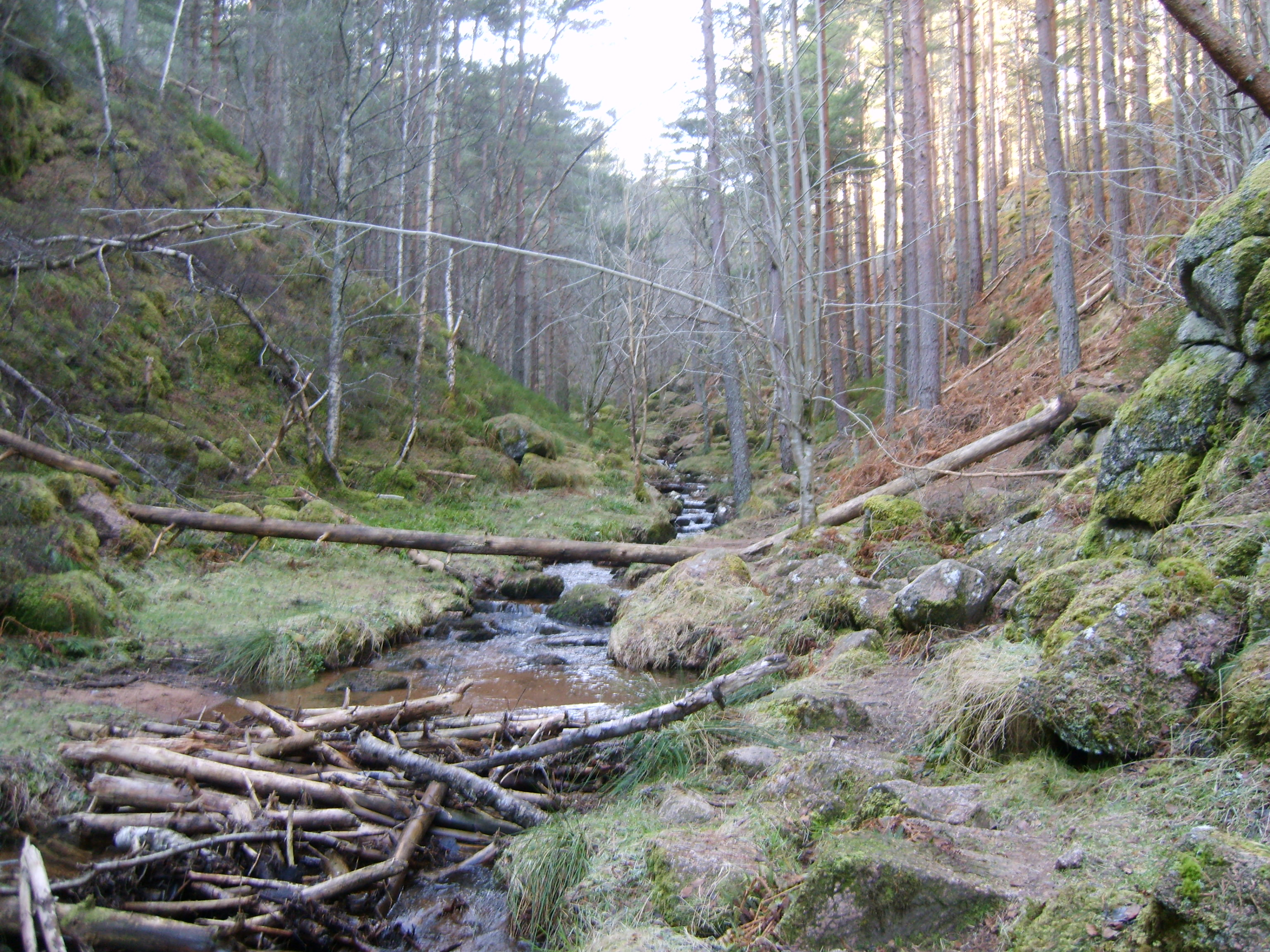
Typical view of the Vat Burn in its upper course

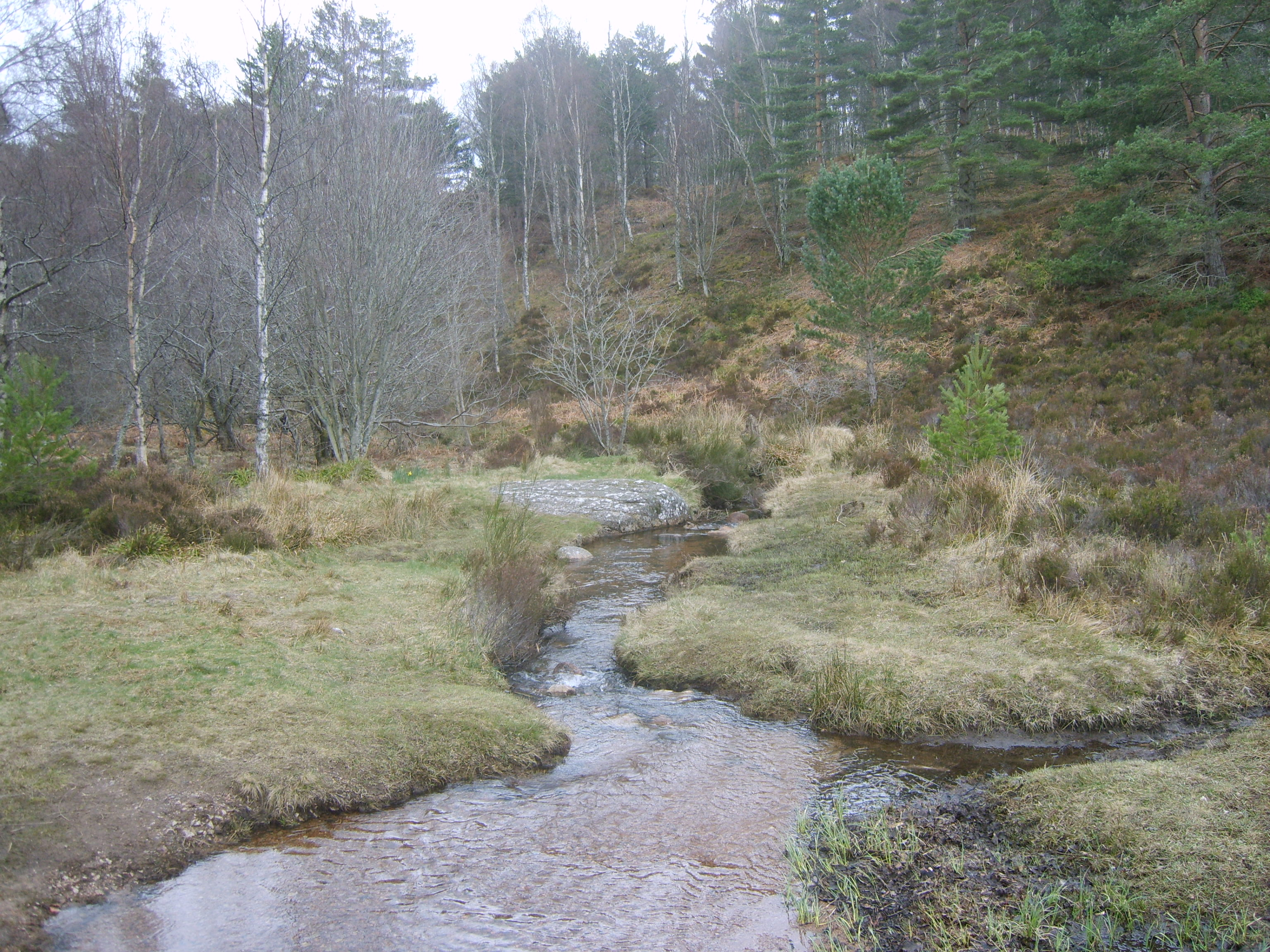
Typical view of the Vat Burn in its lower course

== History of the Vat ==
According to local folklore, the cave behind the waterfall in the Vat was used by Rob Roy, a notorious outlaw, to hide from the authorities. In fact, this is not true, with the cave instead being used as a hiding place for Patrick Gilroy Macgregor, an outlaw renowned for his exploits in Deeside during the 17th century and a possible relative of Rob Roy.

- Video of Gilderoy and the Burn o' Vat (2018)

== The Vat today ==
In modern times, the Vat has become a popular tourist attraction, offering many walks around the area, as well as into the Vat itself. The Vat also has its own visitor centre which provides the opportunity to see taxidermy models of local wildlife, as well as giving detailed explanations of the formation of the local topography. The visitor centre, as well as the Vat itself, are acknowledged as four-star visitor attractions by the Scottish Tourist Board.

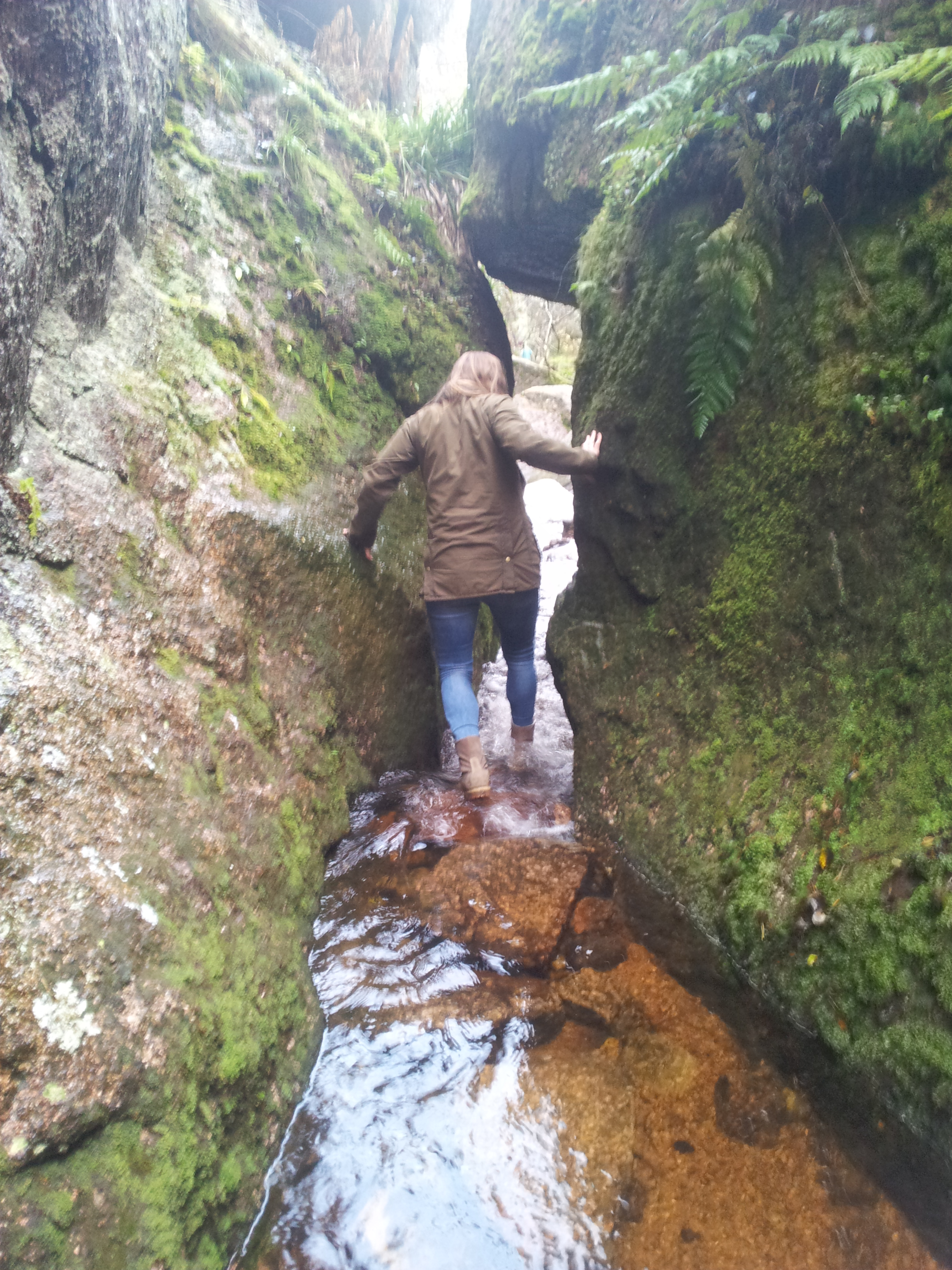
Visitor exiting the Vat, at high water
