= Banchory (disambiguation) =

Banchory is a town in Aberdeenshire, Scotland.

Banchory may also refer to:

- Banchory Academy, a secondary school
- Banchory and Mid-Deeside (ward), a ward of Aberdeenshire Council
- Banchory railway station, a former railway station
- Banchory St Ternan F.C., an association football club
- Banchory Ternan East Church, a congregation of the Church of Scotland
- Banchory Town Hall, a municipal building
- HMS Banchory, a minesweeper ship built for the Royal Navy during World War I

== See also ==
- Banchory-Devenick, a hamlet in Aberdeenshire
