= List of listed buildings in Banchory =

This is a list of listed buildings in the parish of Banchory in Aberdeenshire, Scotland.

== List ==
| Name | Location | Date Listed | Grid Ref. (Note: Sometimes known as OSGB36, the grid reference (where provided) is based on the British national grid reference system used by the Ordnance Survey. • "Guide to National Grid". Ordnance Survey. • "Get-a-map". Ordnance Survey.) | Geo-coordinates | Notes | LB Number (Note: Historic Environment Scotland assign a unique alphanumeric identifier to each designated site in Scotland, for listed buildings this always begins with "LB", for example "LB12345".) | Image |
|---|---|---|---|---|---|---|---|
| The Nook Watson Street | | | | 57°03′09″N 2°30′18″W | Category C(S) | 21868 | Upload Photo |
| 67–69 (Odd Nos) High Street, Including Pharmacy Shopfront | | | | 57°03′05″N 2°30′09″W | Category B | 21872 | Upload Photo |
| Parish Kirk-Yard – Mausoleum | | | | 57°03′06″N 2°29′05″W | Category B | 21858 | Upload Photo |
| St Nicholas 68 Station Road And 70 Station Road | | | | 57°03′09″N 2°29′03″W | Category B | 21860 | Upload Photo |
| 79 High Street "Castle Airy" | | | | 57°03′06″N 2°30′04″W | Category B | 21861 | Upload Photo |
| Burgh Buildings, High Street | | | | 57°03′07″N 2°30′23″W | Category C(S) | 21865 | Upload Photo |
| Market Cross, Burnett Park | | | | 57°03′20″N 2°31′14″W | Category B | 21870 | Upload Photo |
| Banchory-Ternan East Parish Kirk | | | | 57°03′10″N 2°29′05″W | Category B | 21856 | Upload Photo |
| Former Parish Kirk Manse (Celtic Cross Hotel) Including Celtic Cross In Garden Wall | | | | 57°03′06″N 2°29′15″W | Category B | 21857 | Upload Photo |
| Banchory-Ternan West Parish Kirk, High Street | | | | 57°03′06″N 2°30′19″W | Category C(S) | 21863 | Upload Photo |
| Doocot, Kinneskie | | | | 57°03′01″N 2°30′33″W | Category C(S) | 21869 | Upload Photo |
| Parish Kirk-Yard – Watch-House | | | | 57°03′06″N 2°29′05″W | Category B | 21859 | Upload Photo |
| Burnett Arms Hotel, High Street | | | | 57°03′07″N 2°30′16″W | Category B | 21862 | Upload Photo |
| St Ternan's Episcopal Church, High Street | | | | 57°03′06″N 2°30′21″W | Category C(S) | 21864 | Upload Photo |
| Banchory Glen O'Dee Hospital | | | | 57°03′38″N 2°31′17″W | Category A | 21871 | Upload Photo |
| Masonic Hall, Mount Street | | | | 57°03′08″N 2°30′18″W | Category C(S) | 21867 | Upload Photo |
| High Street, K6 Telephone Kiosk Adjacent To Diack's Shop | | | | 57°03′05″N 2°30′09″W | Category B | 21873 | Upload Photo |
| Woodside Road, Elizabeth Cottage | | | | 57°03′25″N 2°29′34″W | Category B | 21874 | Upload Photo |
| Corrybeg High Street | | | | 57°03′07″N 2°30′24″W | Category C(S) | 21866 | Upload Photo |

== Key ==
The scheme for classifying buildings in Scotland is:

- Category A: "buildings of national or international importance, either architectural or historic; or fine, little-altered examples of some particular period, style or building type."
- Category B: "buildings of regional or more than local importance; or major examples of some particular period, style or building type, which may have been altered."
- Category C: "buildings of local importance; lesser examples of any period, style, or building type, as originally constructed or moderately altered; and simple traditional buildings which group well with other listed buildings."

In March 2016 there were 47,288 listed buildings in Scotland. Of these, 8% were Category A, and 50% were Category B, with the remaining 42% being Category C.

== See also ==
- List of listed buildings in Aberdeenshire
