= Ternan =

Saint Ternan
- Born: Fordoun, Aberdeenshire, Scotland
- Feast: 12 June

Saint Ternan (fl. fifth or sixth century) is venerated as the "Bishop of the Picts". Not much is known of his life. Different historians place him either at the mid-fifth century or the latter part of the sixth. Those who place him in the earlier period, associate him with Palladius.

== Life ==
Ternan, is believed to have been born in Fordoun in Aberdeenshire, and may have been converted by the followers of Ninian. He was educated at Candida Casa in Whithorn and baptised by a Celtic cleric named Paulinus. A contemporary of Saint Serf, according to Alban Butler, Ternan was a monk at Culross, which had been founded by St. Serf.

Ternan established a small monastery on the north side of the River Dee near the current graveyard in what is now the town of Banchory. As well as preaching the Christian gospel, he and his followers taught the local people farming, arts and crafts. Churches in Banchory and surrounding area (including Muchalls, Stonehaven and Arbuthnott) bear the name of St Ternan.

Ternan became bishop of the southern Picts, and lived at Abernethy. He ordained Irchard, who assisted him in his missionary labors.

The story of Ternan features two key artifacts, his copy of Matthew's Gospel and his bell or "Ronnecht":

- The "Aberdeen Martyrology" mentions "the Gospel of Matthew belonging to St. Ternan", which was enshrined in a metal case or cumdach (book shrine).
- The bell has an altogether more interesting story. It is said to have been brought to Banchory from Rome by Ternan, and is last recorded as being transferred to the custody of Alexander Symson, vicar of Banquhoriterne in 1491. When the glebe being excavated for the railway in 1863 an old bronze bell was found. It is not clear if this really is Ternan's bell, but it now hangs on the front wall of Banchory Ternan East Church as a visible reminder of the debt that is owed to this early pioneer of Christianity in Scotland.

He is mentioned, along with Saints Brendan, Michael etc., in some blessings and incantations, such as the milking croon of South Uist, collected by Alexander Carmichael in the Hebrides in the 1880s.

St Ternan's feast day is 12 June and he is still celebrated on this holiday in Banchory with St Ternan's Fair which is held on the closest Saturday.

There was a chapel dedicated to Saint Ternan on Taransay, but it was destroyed by coastal erosion in the 1970s.

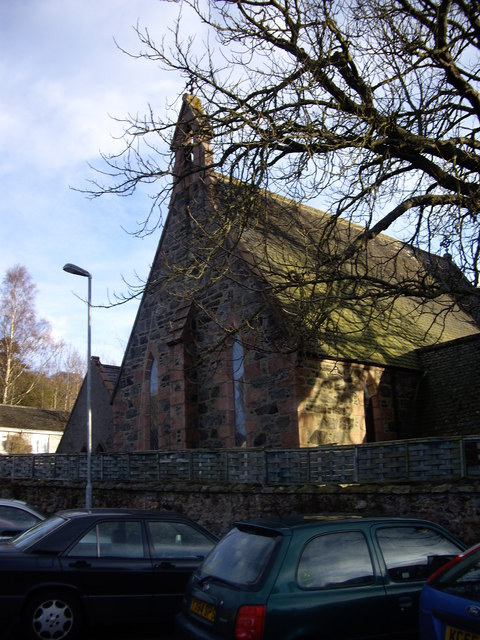
St Ternan's, Banchory

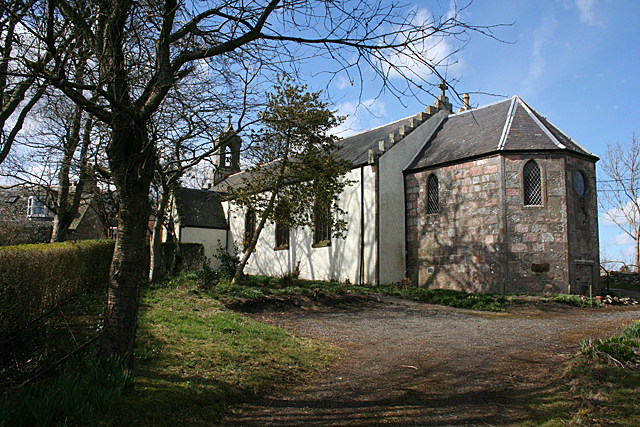
St Ternans Episcopal Church, Muchalls

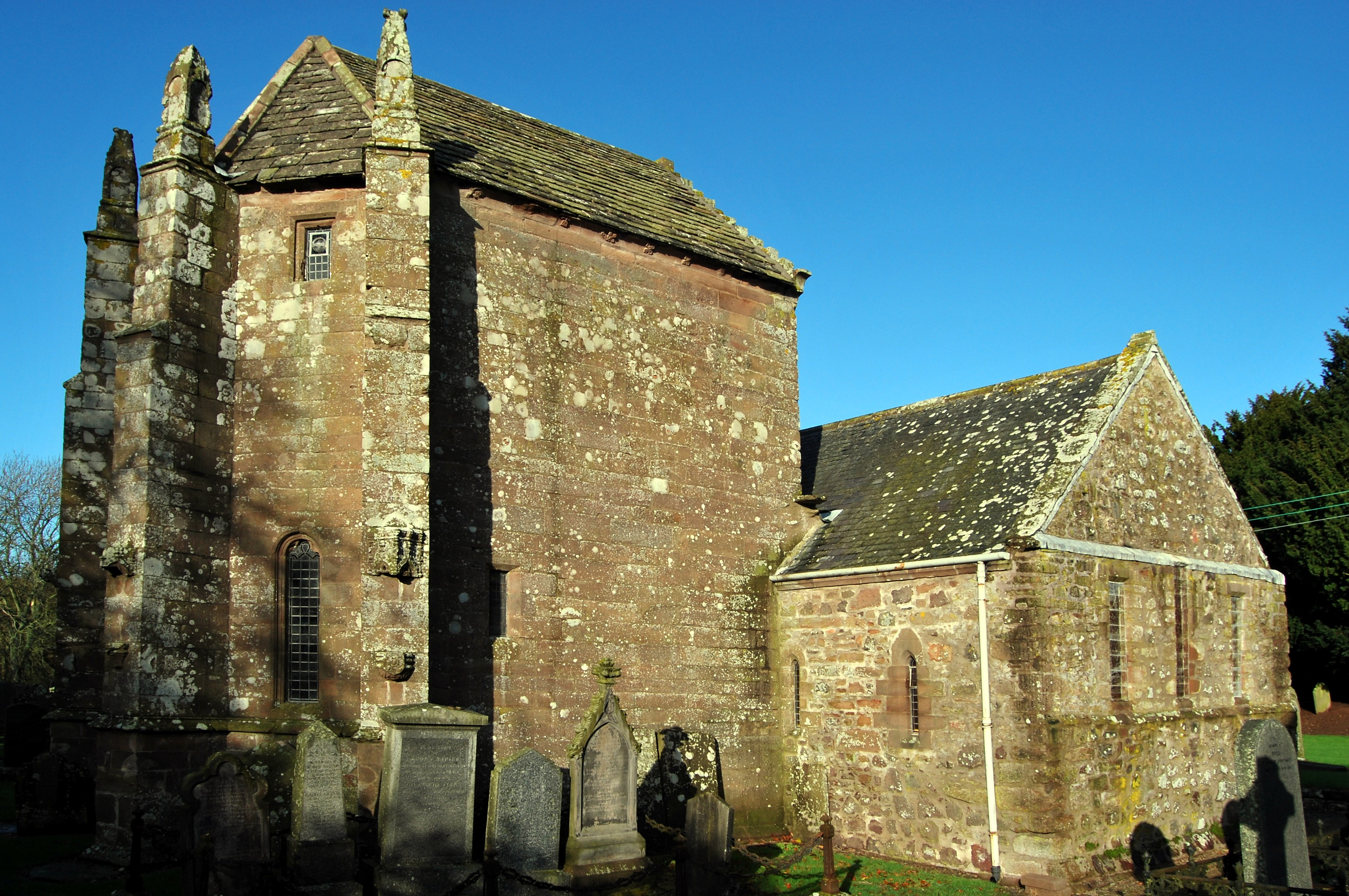
St Ternan's, Arbuthnott

== See also ==
- Trumwine of Abercorn
