= Robert Young Keers =

20th-century Irish-born physician and medical author

Robert Young Keers FRSE FRCPE FRCPSG (1908–1982) was a 20th-century Irish-born physician and medical author. He was an expert in tuberculosis and battled with the disease both personally and in his duties.

== Life ==
He was born on 30 March 1908 in County Antrim the son of Rev William Keers (b.1869) and his wife Matilda Cameron. In 1911 the family were living in Drumbaragh, Killeevan near Monaghan.

He studied medicine at the University of Edinburgh graduating with an MB in 1930 and proceeding MD four years later. He represented the University in cross-country running events despite serious breathing difficulties, having contracted tuberculosis during his studies. His own experience drove him to study the disease in depth.

He had various appointments in Edinburgh, Aberdeenshire and Midhurst before spending some years in Switzerland where there was international recognition of their sanatorium standards. In 1939 he returned to Scotland as superintendent of Tor-na-Dee Sanatorium where he remained until 1957. In 1944 he was elected a Fellow of the Royal College of Physicians and Surgeons of Glasgow.

In 1951 he was elected a Fellow of the Royal Society of Edinburgh. His proposers were David Lawson, Andrew Fergus Hewat, Douglas Guthrie and Charles McNeil.

Around 1951 he was given the additional role as superintendent of the far larger Glen O'Dee Sanatorium nearby at Banchory. He was also made Honorary Consultant to the British Army in Scotland in relation to diseases of the chest. Both sanatoria came under the charge of the NHS in 1955. He left both these Aberdeenshire roles in 1957.

He relocated to North Staffordshire Chest Centre where he remained until retirement in 1973.

He retired to the Isle of Man.

He died on 1 December 1982.

== Family ==
He married Jessie Cameron Lockie in 1939. She was born in Bloemfontein in South Africa in 1907 and had trained as a lawyer.

His first wife died in 1959. He then married Jill Trotter and they had two children.

== Publications ==
- Pulmonary Tuberculosis: A Handbook for Students and Practitioners (1946) with B. G. Rigden
- Pulmonary Tuberculosis: A Journey Down the Centuries (1978)
