= Dee Street Halt railway station =

Former railway station in Scotland

Dee Street Halt
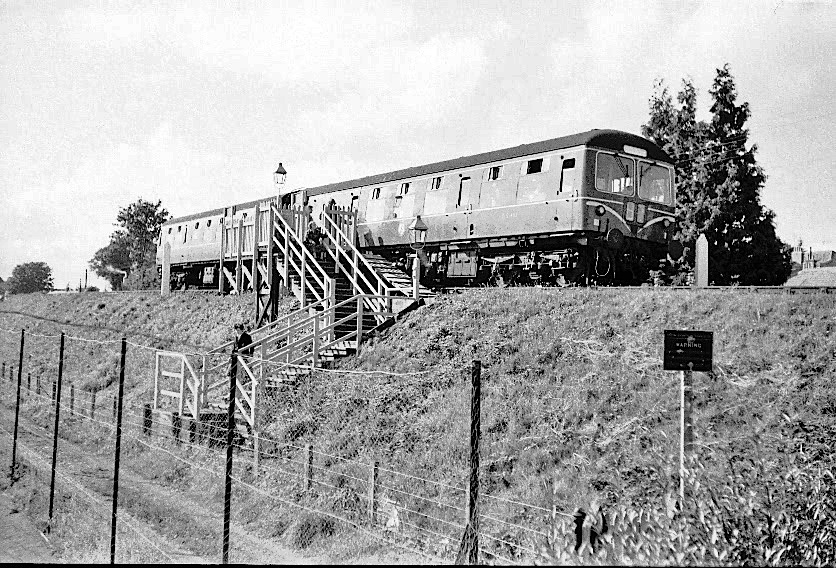
- Dee Street Halt, 1961

General information
- Location: Banchory, Aberdeenshire; Scotland
- Coordinates: 57.049983°N 2.501907°W
- Grid reference: NO 691958
- Platforms: 1

Other information
- Status: Disused

History
- Original company: Scottish Region of British Railways

Key dates
- 6 February 1961: Opened
- 28 February 1966: Closed
Location

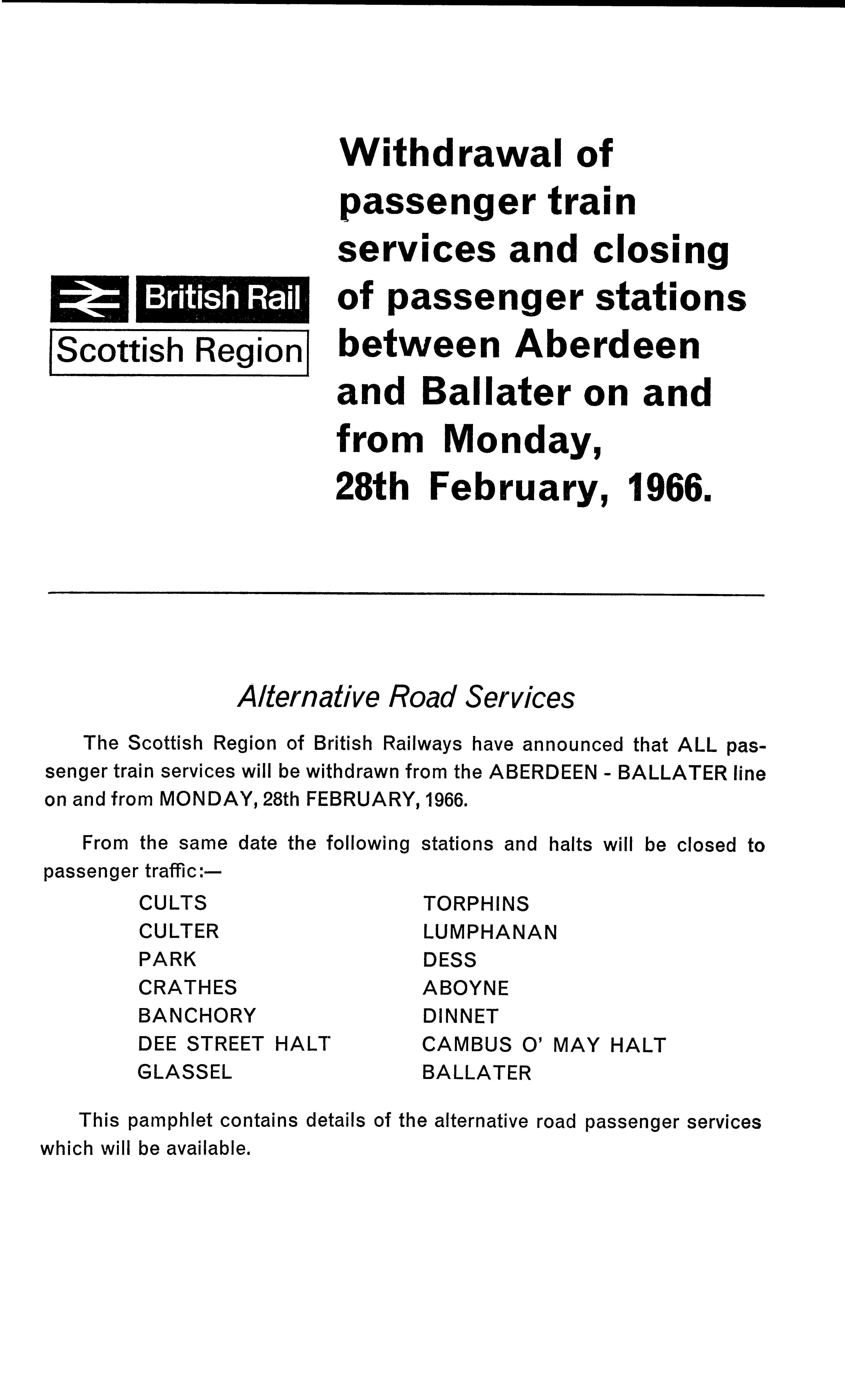
Handbill announcing the closure of Dee Street Halt

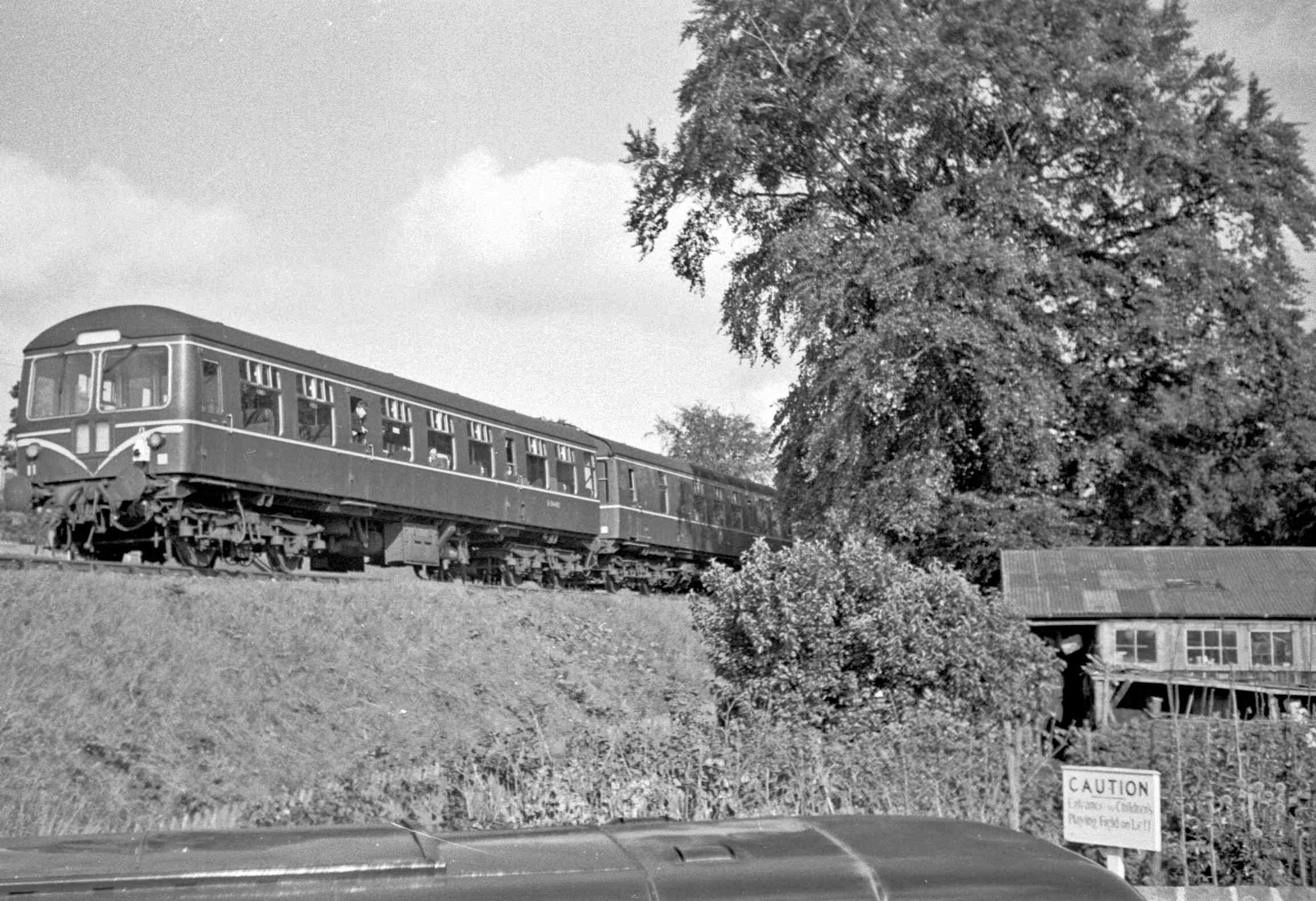
A Cravens DMU leaves Dee Street Halt, September 1961

Dee Street Halt railway station was a short-lived stopping place on the Aberdeen and Ballater railway branch. It was situated at 17 miles 30 chains (28.0 km) from Aberdeen, about 800 yards (730 m) west of Banchory station. This section of line was opened in 1859.

Following the 1955 Modernisation Plan efforts were made on several parts of the British Railways network to increase passenger traffic by the construction of additional stopping places and the use of diesel multiple-unit trains. Fourteen very simple stops were opened in 1958–61 on lines in Scotland and on the Western Region, as well as slightly more substantial ‘traditional’ halts on the Banbury – Buckingham line in 1956; Rosslynlee Hospital Halt on the Peebles Railway in 1958; and Dee Street in 1961. None produced sufficient additional revenue to prevent closure of the lines concerned.

The purpose of the stop was to serve the town of Banchory better than the long-established main station which was some distance from the centre.

The structure was exceptionally simple, consisting of a very short wooden platform reached from the street by a long wooden staircase. There was no shelter and only oil lamps were provided. By the time of closure all passenger services on the branch were worked by diesel multiple-unit trains, after an experiment with battery-electric railcars in 1958 – 1962.

The halt opened on 6 February 1961, and closed when the Deeside line passenger service was withdrawn from 28 February 1966.

== Routes ==
Preceding station	Historical railways	Following station
Banchory; Line and station closed	Scottish Region of British Railways; Deeside Railway	Glassel; Line and station closed
