= Cluny Crichton Castle =

Ruined castle in Scotland

- Near Banchory, Aberdeenshire, Scotland
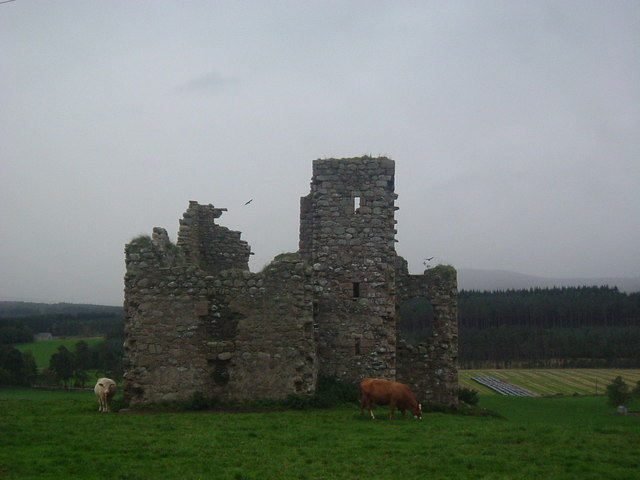

Site information
- Type: Tower House
- Condition: Ruined

Location
- Location within Aberdeenshire
- Coordinates: 57.088°N 2.519°W

Site history
- Built: 1666
- Built by: George Crichton
- Materials: Granite

Cluny Crichton Castle (also known as Clounie Crighton Castle) is a ruined 3-storey tower house on the southern slopes of the Hill of Fare in Aberdeenshire, 4 km (2.5 miles) north of Banchory and 6.5 km (4 miles) east of Torphins.

== History ==
In 1572, Robert Crichton of Cluny married Agnes Mowbray (d. 1575), a daughter of the Laird of Barnbougle, her older sisters Barbara and Gilles Mowbray were servants of Mary, Queen of Scots in England. Crichton wrote to his kinsman James Menzies of Weem to send wild fowls and aquavitae (whisky) for the wedding at Barnbougle. He expected his new bride to look after his young daughters from a previous marriage, and was proud of his choice, "she has many good qualities in weaving, sewing and other handicrafts, wherein she may be helpful to your daughters and mine." She died two years later, after having a daughter Agnes Crichton.

The granite castle was built in 1666 in a modified L-plan design. Little is known of the history of the castle. It was built by George Crichton shortly after his marriage to the only daughter of Sir Robert Douglas of Tilquhillie.

== Modern day ==
The castle has since fallen into ruin with some stones being taken for construction of nearby farmsteads. The castle now stands in agricultural land on the Cluny Crichton Farm. It has been listed by Historic Environment Scotland as a Category B listed building and has also been categorised by the Buildings at Risk Register for Scotland as at a high level of risk.
