= Glen o' Dee Hospital =

- NHS Grampian
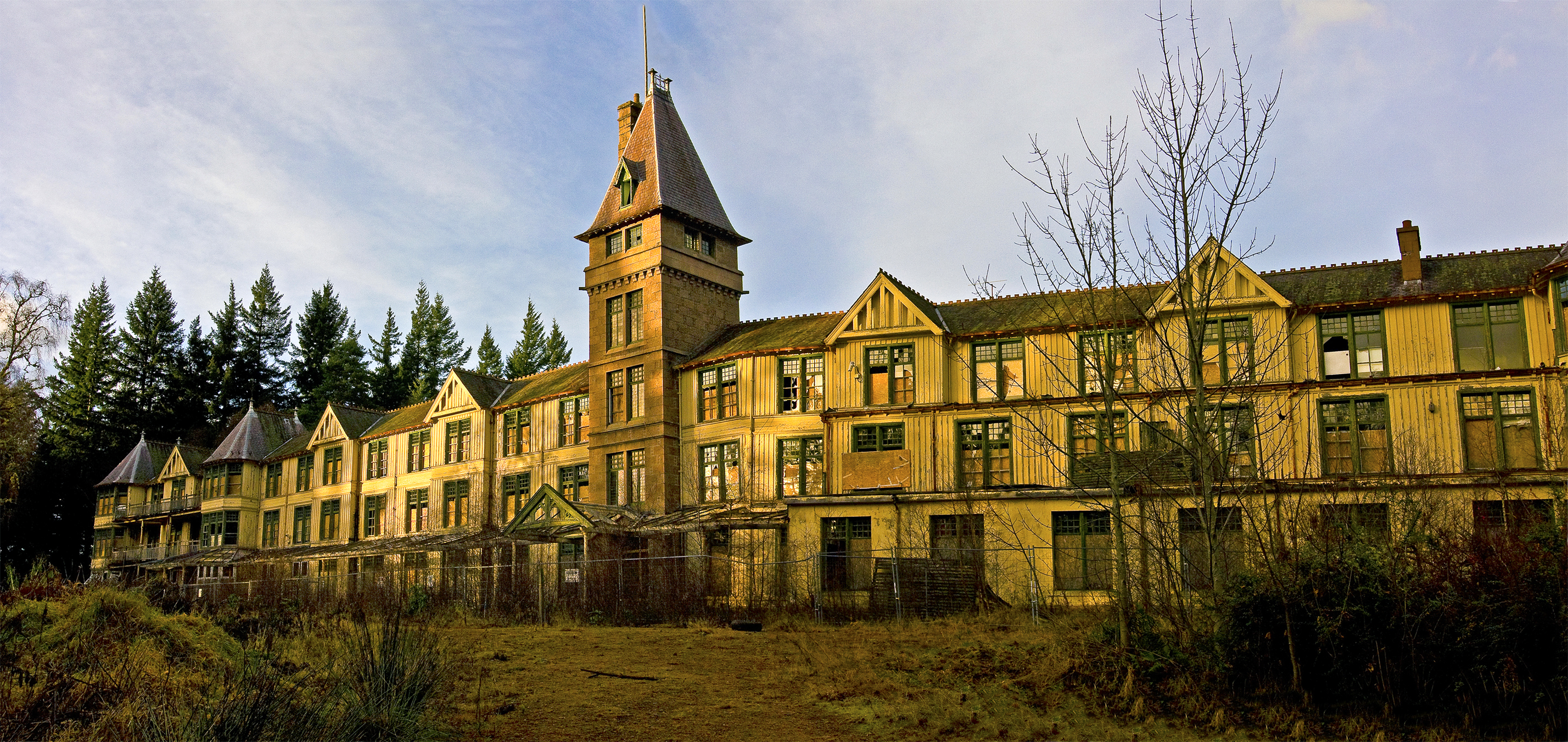
- The original building, pictured in 2012

- Shown in Aberdeenshire

Geography
- Location: Banchory, Aberdeenshire, Scotland
- Coordinates: 57°3′40″N 2°31′11″W

Organisation
- Care system: NHS Scotland
- Type: Community

Services
- Emergency department: No

History
- Founded: 1900

Links
- Website: NHS Grampian - Glen o' Dee Hospital - Banchory
- Lists: Hospitals in Scotland

Glen o' Dee Hospital is situated in the west end of Banchory, Aberdeenshire, Scotland. It is a small community hospital that provides services for the population of Royal Deeside supported by local GPs. It is managed by NHS Grampian.

== History ==
The original building was commissioned as a sanctuary for tuberculosis patients and opened as Nordrach on Dee Hospital in 1900.

When tuberculosis died down it served as a luxury hotel (when it became "Glen o' Dee"), but was taken over during the Second World War to serve as a billet for troops. In 1955 it became a convalescent hospital. It reprised its role in contagious diseases when a typhoid epidemic hit nearby Aberdeen in the 1960s, but its last use was as a residential home for the elderly before it closed in 1998.

The original building was featured on the BBC's Restoration programme and, although local people campaigned to have it restored, it continued to sit empty and deteriorating. The building was badly damaged by fire on 14 October 2016 with police treating the incident as wilful fire-raising.

On 14 November 1989 it became a Category A listed building; on 25 November 2016 it was delisted.

A small modern community hospital staffed by GPs now operates on the site. A befriending service was established at the community hospital in 2013 matching older patients ready to be discharged, but lacking confidence to return home, with a volunteer befriender. The volunteers then visit the older patients regularly in hospital and at home after discharge, offering on-going emotional and practical support. Local GPs reported the service had improved the overall health and wellbeing of their patients and reduced the number of medically unnecessary GP visits.

Robert Young Keers FRSE was Superintendent of the facility from around 1950 to 1957.

The hospital was destroyed in October 2016 after it was wilfully set on fire by two 13 year old boys.
