= Banchory Ternan East Church =

Church in Banchory, Aberdeenshire, Scotland

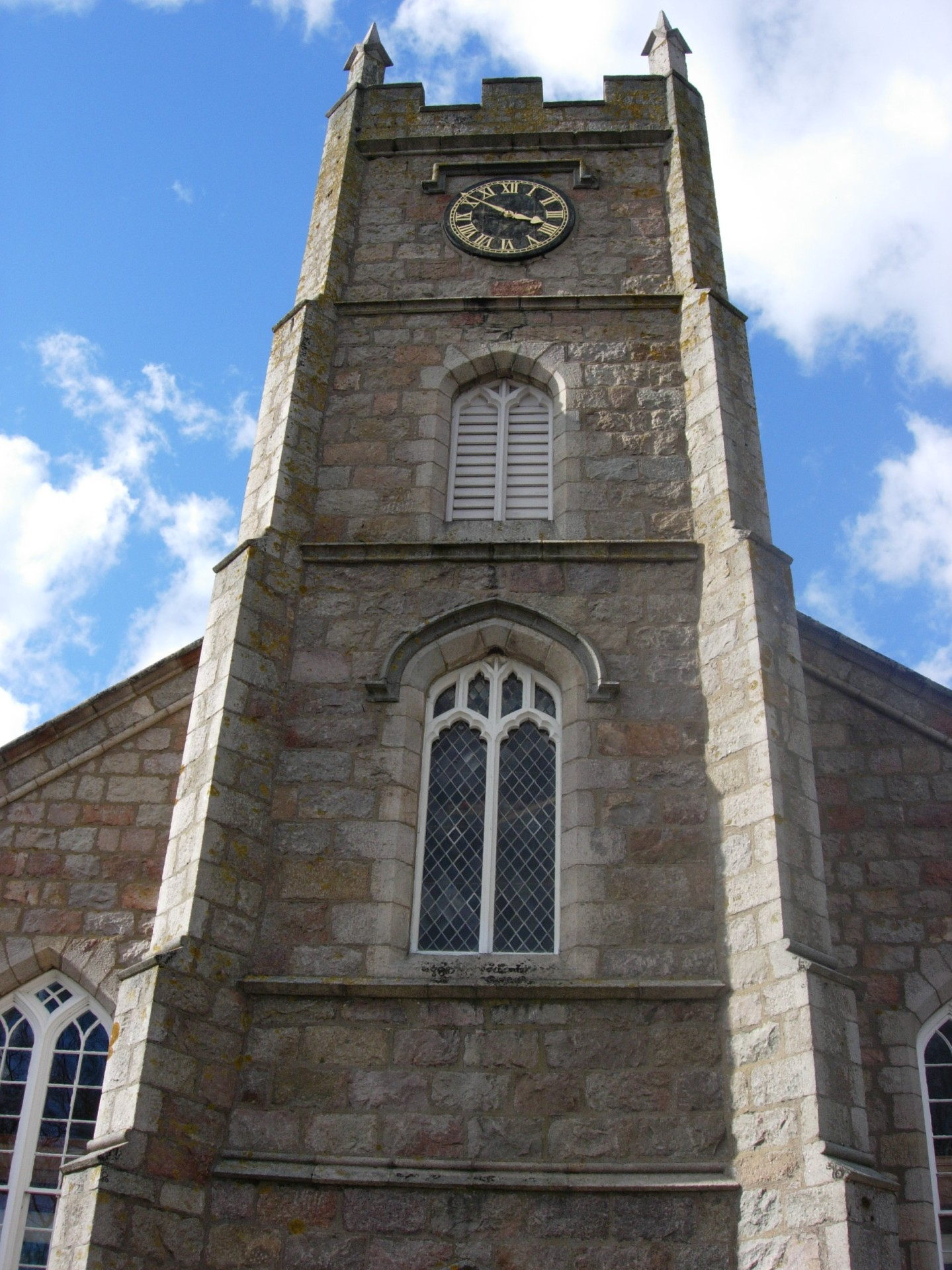
- Banchory Ternan East Church
- Banchory Ternan East Church
- 57°03′10″N 2°29′03″W
- Language: English
- Denomination: Church of Scotland
- Churchmanship: Christian, Presbyterian, Reformed
- Website: http://www.banchoryeastchurch.com/

Administration
- Province: Formerly: Kincardine and Deeside
- Parish: Banchory East

Banchory Ternan East Parish Church is a congregation of the Church of Scotland, a member of the Presbyterian Church. The church building is located in Station Road, Banchory, Kincardineshire, Scotland. The church today serves the east parish of the town of Banchory in Royal Deeside.

== History ==
Over 1,500 years ago, Saint Ternan brought Christianity to Banchory with the erection of a monastery. As well as preaching the Christian gospel, he and his followers taught the local people farming, arts, and crafts. In AD 1143, the Abbot of Arbroath received a grant of land from William the Lion which extended as far as Banchory. A new settlement was created near the churchyard, and a church, school, and houses were built.

From that period there was a continuous Christian presence in Banchory with several churches being built in succession. One such church was opened in 1664/65; the bell from this church now hangs in the old Watchtower in the graveyard. That church was demolished and a new one built in 1775, but it proved to be too small for the growing congregation and was dismantled in 1824. The stones were used in the construction of the present church in 1825.

It became a Category B listed building on 18 August 1972.

== The 1825 church ==
John Smith was the architect of Banchory Ternan East Church, and his 1825 plans showing the seating arrangements for the heritors and their tenants are held by the congregation. The style of the building is very typical of his work: the ogee profile of the coping stones on the front boundary wall is his personal "trade mark" being found on most of his buildings.

John Smith (1781–1852), known as "Tudor Johnie", was Aberdeen's first city architect. Most of his churches are in the Perpendicular Gothic style; Udny and Nigg are not unlike Banchory, while Aberdeen South in Belmont Street (now a theme pub), St Clement's in Footdee (closed), and Fourdon (=Auchenblae) Parish Church are more grandiose exercise of the same genre.

The most interesting features of Banchory Ternan are its tower and the windows of the main church building. Like most towers built by Smith, it comprises four storeys entrance porch, gallery, belfry and clock stage, all surmounted by a castellated parapet with corner pinnacles. In Banchory, Smith has placed the clock stage topmost — it usually appears between the gallery and belfry levels — the restricted height of the tower may have dictated this. Here too, the pinnacles are small, purely decorative unlike the larger, structural and often highly decorated examples quoted above.

The windows of the sanctuary are in a Georgian Gothic style having the main outlines of the Perpendicular form but infilled with clear glazed casements in the Georgian manner. Substantial buttresses (to withstand the outward pressure of the side galleries) and corner pinnacles strengthen and enhance the otherwise plain exterior.

Internally, little of Smith's influence remains — the removal of the side galleries gives the church a squarish rather than an elongated Gothic "feel". However the four iron pillars supporting the remaining back gallery are identical with those in Fordoun Church, and seem original. The Chancel, an addition of 1928–30, echoes Smith's style in a somewhat lighter vein. The finely moulded chancel arch contains and sets off the excellent stained glass and the crisply detailed woodwork of the organ case and wall panels.

== Ministers ==
- Robert Stainforth 1262
- Sir Alexander Symnson 1484
- Sir Andrew Symson 1497 — was minister in the diocese of Brechin and was presented with "the perpetual vicarage of the Parish of Banchory St Ternan" by the monastery of Arbroath
- Rev James Reid (1567–1602) — His charge included Banchory and Strachen. He was described as a man of considerable wit.
- Rev Robert Reid 1602 — Son of James Reid
- Rev Alexander Cant 164? — He joined the Protesters in 1651 and was thus deprived of the ministry at the Restoration
- Rev Robert Reid 166? — Grandson of the previous Robert Reid
- Rev Robert Burnett (1682–1699) — He was buried at Banchory Ternan Churchyard
- Rev Martin Schank 1694 — His dates appear to clash with Robert Burnett
- Rev George Campbell (1748–1757) — Moved to Aberdeen in 1757 where he became Professor of Divinity and Principle of Mariscal College
- Rev Francis Dauney 1758 — Criticised by Douglas of Tilquhillie for the brevity of his sermons
- Rev James Gregory (1800–1829) — Preached at opening of the new church in 1825
- Rev William Anderson (1830–1843) — Author of the history of the parish printed in "The Statistical Account of Scotland"
- Rev James Scott (1843–1846)
- Very Rev Dr George Hutchison (1847–1894) — Moderator of the General Assembly of the Church of Scotland in 1877
- Rev James Hall (1894–1920)
- Rev John W Anderson (1921–1952) — Remained until his retirement
- Rev JG Grant Fleming (1952–1966) — Awarded both the DSO And the MC serving as a combatant officer during the First World War
- Rev AF Grimstone (1966–1968)
- Rev William Nicholson (1969–1985) — Remained in the charge until retirement
- Rev Hamish Fleming (1986–2001) — Called to the parish from St Mark's Church in Aberdeen. Remained until his retirement
- Rev Mary M Haddow (2001-2012) Mary was called to Banchory East Church as Parish Minister in 2001. Translated to Pitlochry Church of Scotland in 2012.
- Rev Dr Alan Murray (2013–2023) — Remained in the charge until retirement.

One former minister at Banchory Ternan East Church, the Very Rev George Hutchison, served as Moderator of the General Assembly in 1887.

== The church today ==
The Mission of the church is "To know Christ and to make Him Known" — "Our aim as God's people in this place, is to serve the Lord Jesus Christ, make his name and love known as widely as possible, and to seek to serve the community in which God has placed us".

The minister of Banchory East Church is a Chaplain at Banchory Primary School, Hill of Banchory Primary School, Crathes Primary School, Banchory Academy and Bellfield Care Home.

In 2009, the congregation had a membership roll of 636 members. At the end of 2019, the roll was 484 members, and an annual income of nearly £80,000.

== See also ==
- List of Church of Scotland parishes
