= George Hutchison (moderator) =

Scottish minister

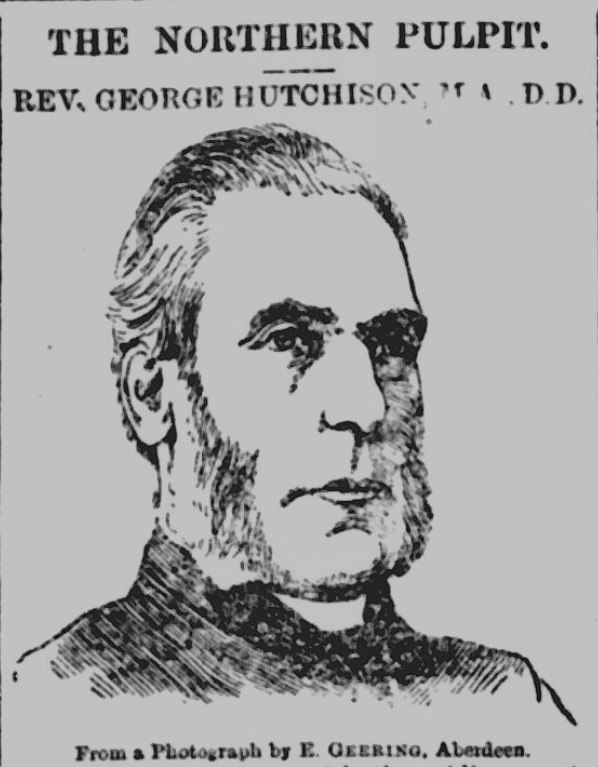
Very Rev George Hutchison, D.D. (1818-1894), parish minister of Banchory-Ternan

George Hutchison (1818–1894) was a Scottish minister who served as Moderator of the General Assembly of the Church of Scotland in 1887.

== Life ==
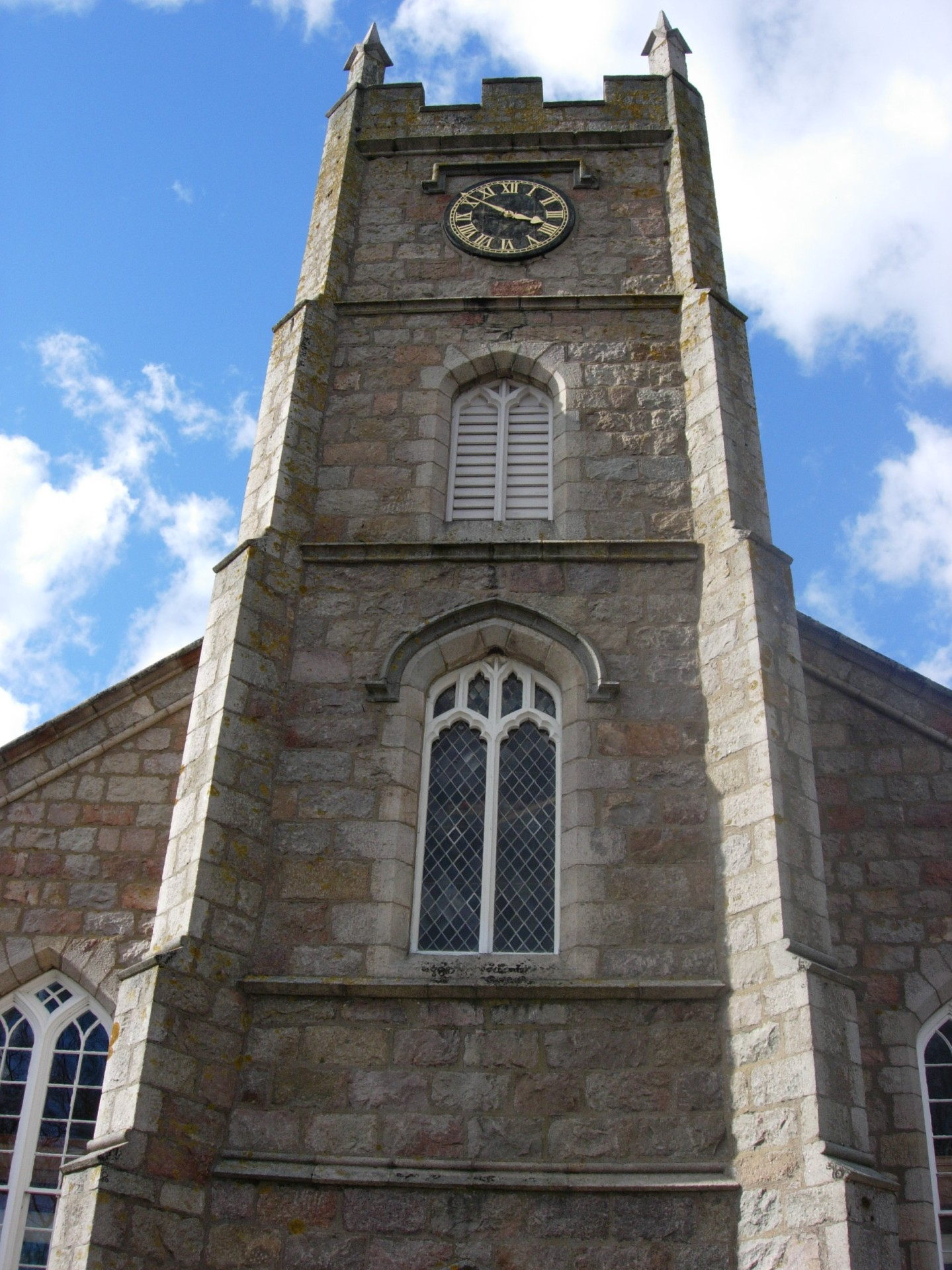
Banchory Ternan Church

Hutchison was born in Forres the son of George Hutchison on 24 August 1818. Although a native of Moray, he was reared in the parish of Auldearn in Nairn. He was educated partly at the local Parish School, and partly at the Grammar School in Old Aberdeen. He then studied Divinity at King's College, Aberdeen. After taking his MA degree in 1840, he studied under Dr Mearns at Aberdeen, Dr Chalmers at Edinburgh, and Principal Haldane at St Andrew's.

In March 1845 he was ordained as minister of Monzie in Perthshire. In November 1846 he translated to Banchory Ternan in Kincardineshire and was minister there for 48 years. On 5 March 1870, Aberdeen University bestowed upon him the honorary title of Doctor of Divinity.

Rev Hutchison was an esteemed scholar with a thorough knowledge of oriental languages, and also a staunch Tory who participated activily in Conservative Party rallies. Due to his strong influence on the parishioners of his county, his opponents nicknamed him "The Pope of Kincardineshire."

On 19 May 1887 he took over from John Cunningham, Principal of St Mary's College, St Andrews, as Moderator of the General Assembly of the Church of Scotland, the highest position in the Scottish Church. He was succeeded in 1888 by Rev William Henry Gray, minister of Liberton.

He died at his house in Surbiton Hill,London, on 20 November 1894. His position at Banchory was filled by James Hall.

== Family ==
In February 1847 he married Jane Stewart Wright (1825–84), third daughter of Rev George Tod Wright, DD, parish minister of Kingsbarns in Fife, and Jessie Moncrieff. A nephew of Hutchison's, and the grandson of Rev Wright of Kingsbarns, was Rev Maxwell James Wright, minister of St Ninian's, Aberdeen, whose wife, Edith Graham Campbell, was the daughter of Rev George Campbell of Eastwood, and the granddaughter of Rev James Campbell, minister of Traquair. George and Jane Hutchison had issue:

- George Wright Hutchison, MD (1848-1922)
- John Hutchison (1850-1891) died in Singapore
- Maxwell Hutchison (1853-1897), minister of Kirkmahoe in Dumfriesshire
- Euphemia Hutchison (1858-1913)
- Anna Moncrieff Hutchison (1862-1936)

== Publications ==
- Knowledge (Aberdeen, 1863)
- A Competent Portion (Aberdeen, 1886)
