= Kinneskie Road drill hall, Banchory =

Kinneskie Road drill hall
- Banchory, Scotland
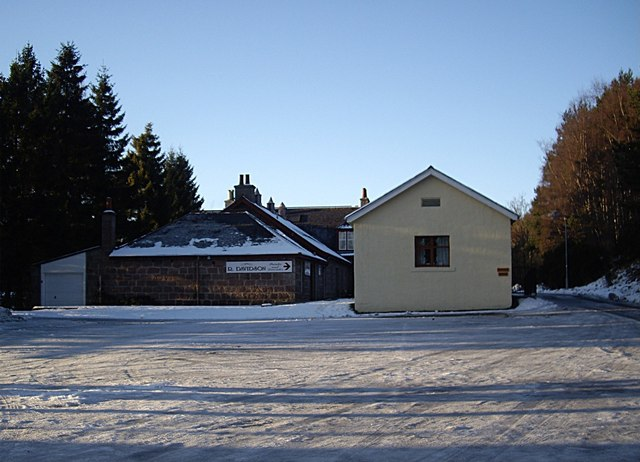
- Kinneskie Road drill hall, Banchory

Site information
- Type: Drill hall

Location
- Location within Aberdeenshire
- Coordinates: 57.05088°N 2.50850°W

Site history
- Built: 1908
- Built for: War Office
- In use: 1908-Present

The Kinneskie Road drill hall is a former military installation near Banchory, Scotland.

== History ==
The building was designed as the headquarters of the 7th (Deeside Highland) Battalion, the Gordon Highlanders and was completed about 1908. The battalion was mobilised at the drill hall in August 1914 before being deployed to the Western Front. The 7th Battalion amalgamated with the 5th (Buchan and Formartin) Battalion to form 5th/7th Battalion, The Gordon Highlanders in 1921 but with its headquarters located at Bucksburn. The 5th Battalion and 7th Battalion separated again in 1939 but then re-amalgamated in 1946.

In 1947 the 5th/6th (Banff, Buchan and Donside) Battalion, The Gordon Highlanders was formed with C Company based at the Kinneskie Road drill hall in Banchory. The 5th/6th Battalion amalgamated with the 4th/7th Battalion to form 3rd Battalion, The Gordon Highlanders in 1961. The drill hall was subsequently decommissioned and converted for commercial use and is now a decorator’s workshop.
