= Tor-na-Dee Hospital =

Tor-Na-Dee Hospital
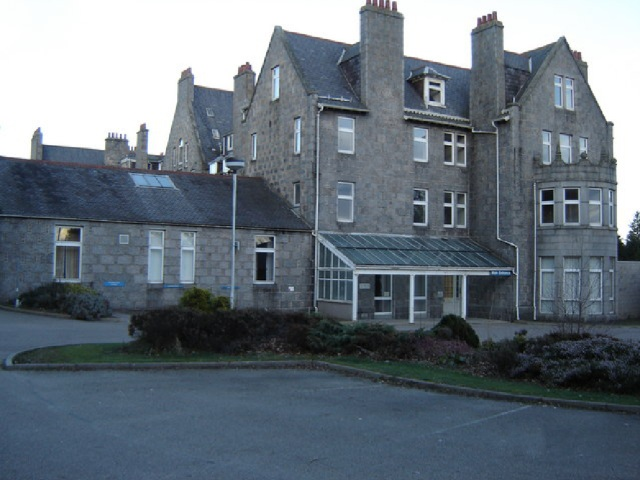
- Tor-Na-Dee Hospital

- Shown in Aberdeen

Geography
- Location: Milltimber; Aberdeen, Scotland
- Coordinates: 57.1078°N 2.2266°W

History
- Founded: 1899
- Closed: 2002

Links
- Other links: List of hospitals in Scotland

Tor-Na-Dee Hospital was a health facility at Milltimber, Aberdeen, Scotland.

== History ==
The hospital, which was established as part of an initiative by Dr Alexander Stewart to provide services to patients with rheumatism, opened as Deeside Hydropathic Hospital in November 1899. It became the Tor-Na-Dee Sanitorium (meaning Hill by the River Dee) in 1918.

An east wing was opened in 1920 and the hospital was acquired by the Red Cross in 1945. After joining the National Health Service in 1955, it became the Tor-Na-Dee Hospital in 1960. Further extensions included the Roxburghe House palliative care unit which opened in 1977 and a day care unit for cancer patients which opened in 1990. The hospital closed in 2002 and the building was subsequently converted into apartments as part of the Woodland Grove development.

From 1939 to 1957 the sanatorium was under the charge of Dr Robert Young Keers FRSE.
