= Glassel railway station =

Closed railway station in Britain

Glassel
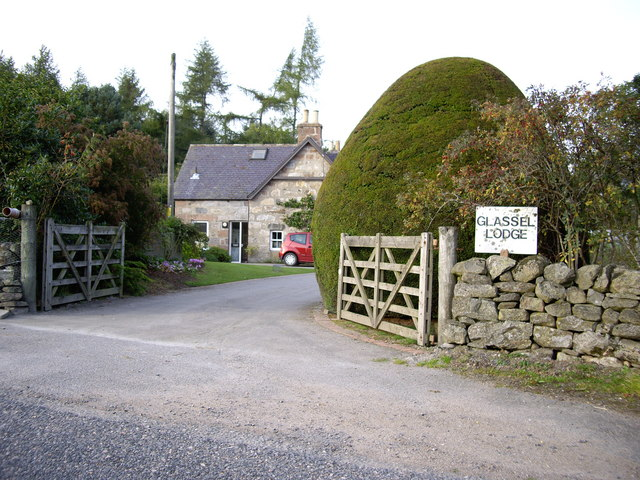
- Glassel Lodge

General information
- Location: Glassel, Aberdeenshire; Scotland
- Coordinates: 57.0824°N 2.5748°W
- Grid reference: NO652991
- Platforms: 1

Other information
- Status: Disused

History
- Original company: Deeside Railway
- Pre-grouping: Great North of Scotland Railway
- Post-grouping: LNER

Key dates
- 2 December 1859: Station opened
- 28 February 1966: Station closed to passengers
- 18 July 1966: Line closed entirely
Location

Glassel railway station is a disused railway station in Britain. It served Glassel House, the Mill of Beltie and the local farms and the inhabitants of this rural area from 1859 to 1966 on the Deeside Railway that ran from Aberdeen (Joint) to Ballater.

== History ==
The station was opened in 1859 on the Deeside Railway Extension by the Deeside Railway. Later it became part of the Great North of Scotland Railway and at grouping merged with the London and North Eastern Railway. It stood 21.5 miles (34.5 km) from Aberdeen and 22.75 miles (36.5 km) from Ballater. It was closed to passengers on 28 February 1966. The line has been lifted and sections form part of the Deeside Way long-distance footpath. The station was unstaffed from circa 1964 when goods services were withdrawn.

== Infrastructure ==
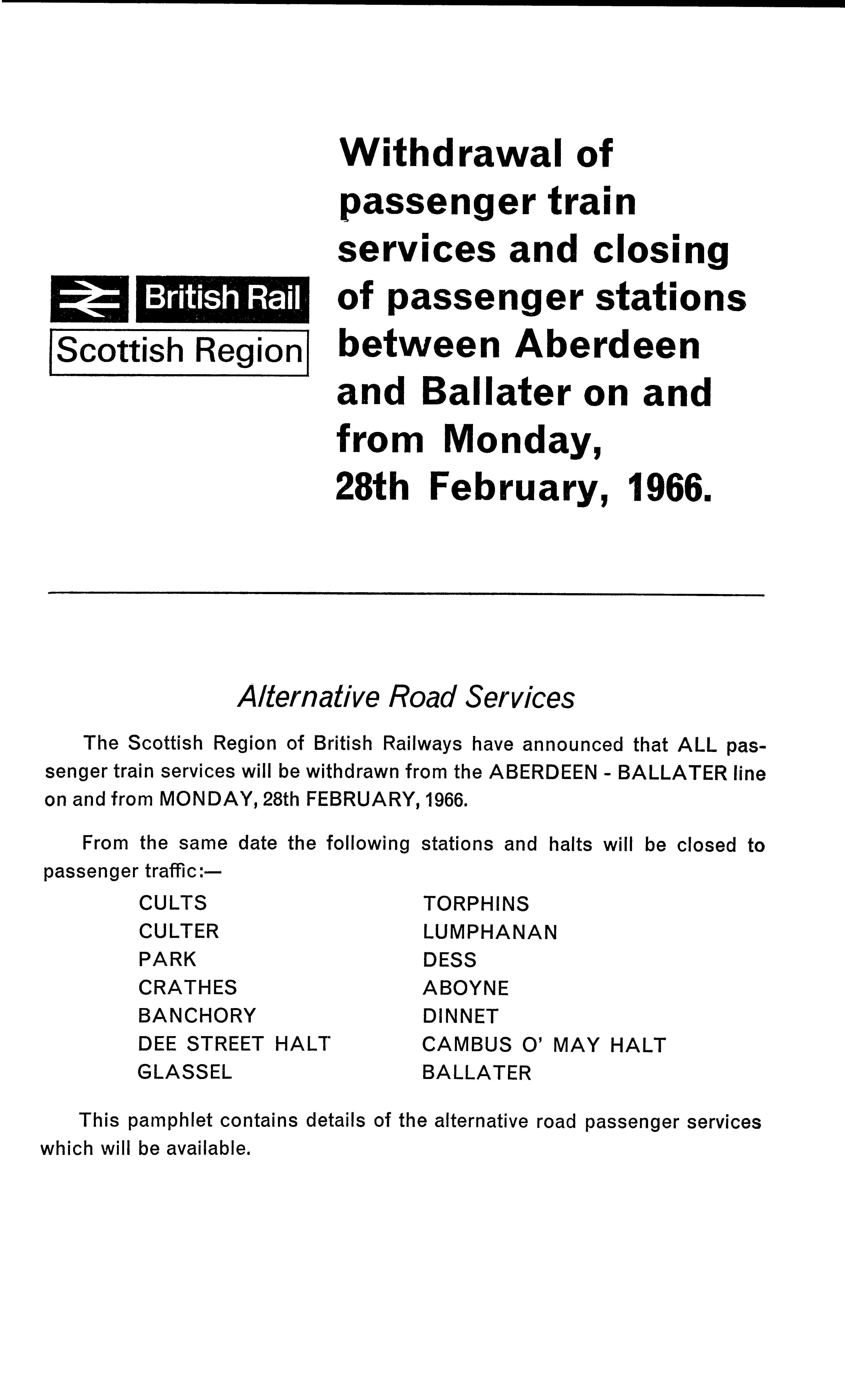
The 1966 BRB Closure notice.

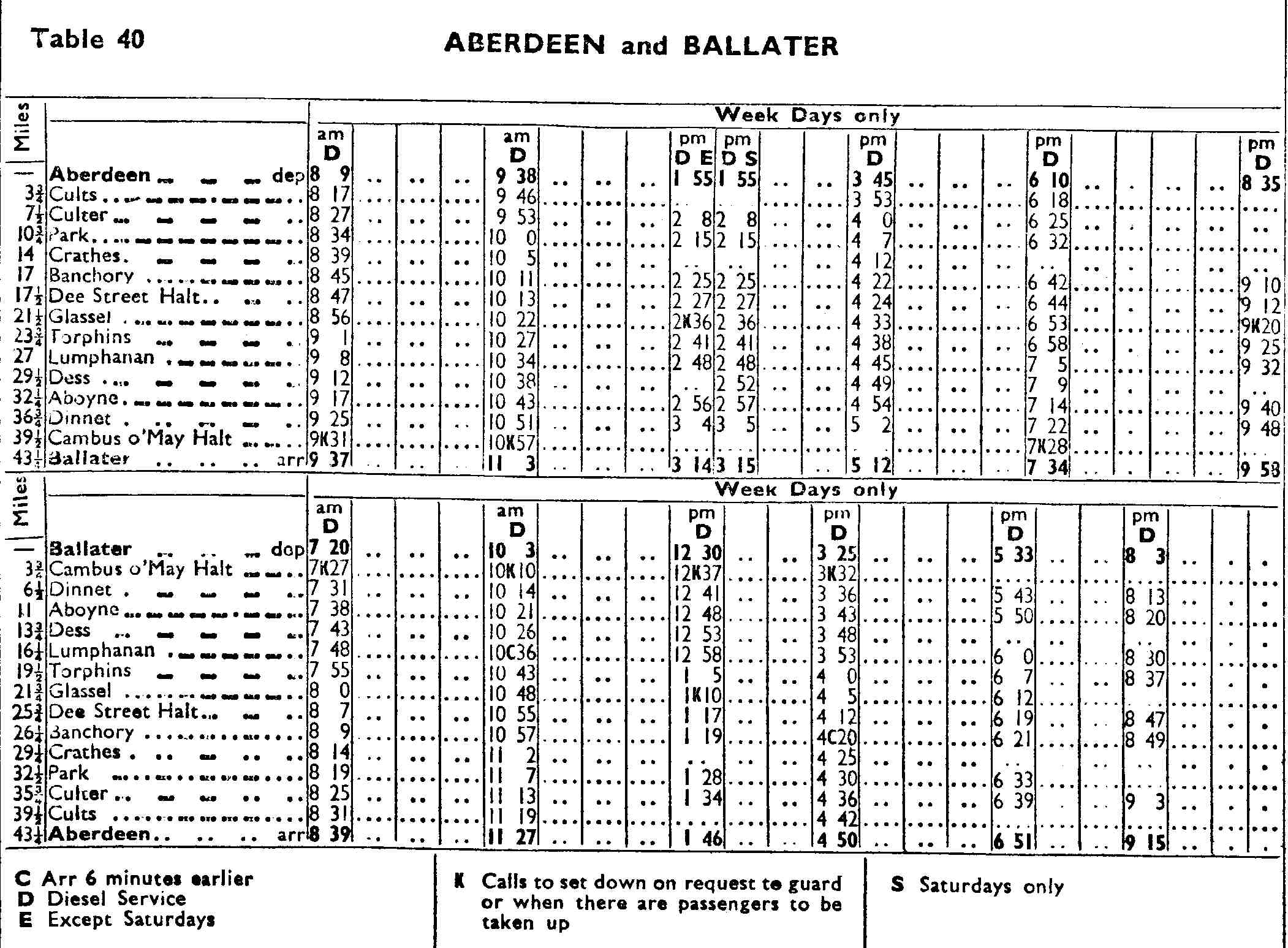
The 1963 timetable.

The station had a single platform and a waiting room and ticket office similar to those at Torphins, Lumphanan and elsewhere on the line, consisting of a rough-cast and brick built single-storey structure, with round-headed windows at the front and a central covered area. A station master's house stood just to the east of the main station buildings, constructed after 1866. A signal post is indicated on the platform in 1866.

At the east end of the platform was a shed that contained the ground frame or signal box that operated the points for the goods yard siding with its loading dock and weighing machine accessed by a lane at Glassel Village Hall. The line was single track and the stone platform was built on a straight section of track. The sidings were lifted by 1965 following the cessation of goods services.

== Services ==
The line was chosen to trial the battery multiple unit and once introduced on 21 April 1958 the train service was doubled to six trains a day and in addition a Sunday service was reinstated.

== 21st century ==
The much modified and enlarged station buildings survive as private dwellings.

== Sources ==
- Butt, R. V. J. (October 1995). The Directory of Railway Stations: details every public and private passenger station, halt, platform and stopping place, past and present (1st ed.). Sparkford: Patrick Stephens Ltd. ISBN 978-1-85260-508-7. OCLC 60251199. OL 11956311M.
- Maxtone, Graham and Cooper, Mike (2018). Then and Now on the Great North. V.1. GNoSR Association. ISBN 978-0902343-30-6.

Preceding station	Historical railways	Following station
Dee Street Halt; Line and station closed	Great North of Scotland Railway; Deeside Railway	Torphins; Line and station closed
