= Banchory railway station =

Disused railway station in Banchory, Aberdeenshire

Banchory
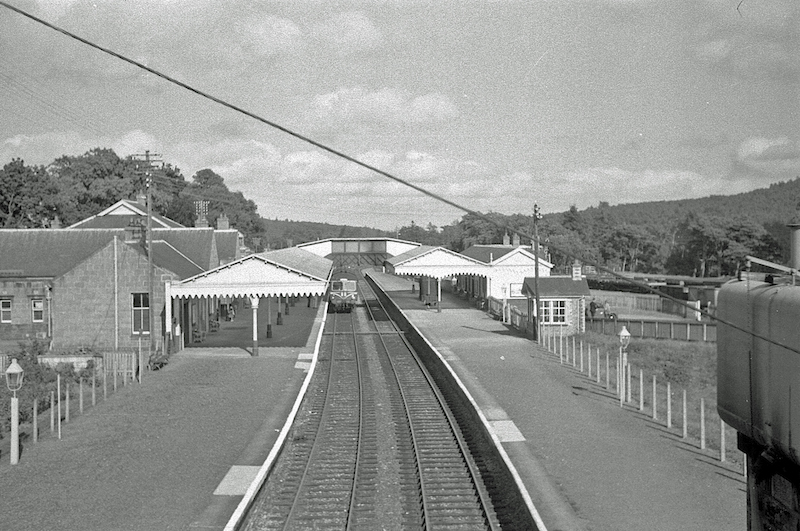
- September 1961

General information
- Location: Banchory, Aberdeenshire; Scotland
- Coordinates: 57.0505°N 2.4905°W
- Grid reference: NO 705957
- Platforms: 2

Other information
- Status: Disused

History
- Original company: Deeside Railway
- Pre-grouping: Great North of Scotland Railway
- Post-grouping: London and North Eastern Railway; Scottish Region of British Railways

Key dates
- 8 September 1853: Opened
- 28 February 1966: Closed to passengers
- 18 July 1966: Closed to goods
Location

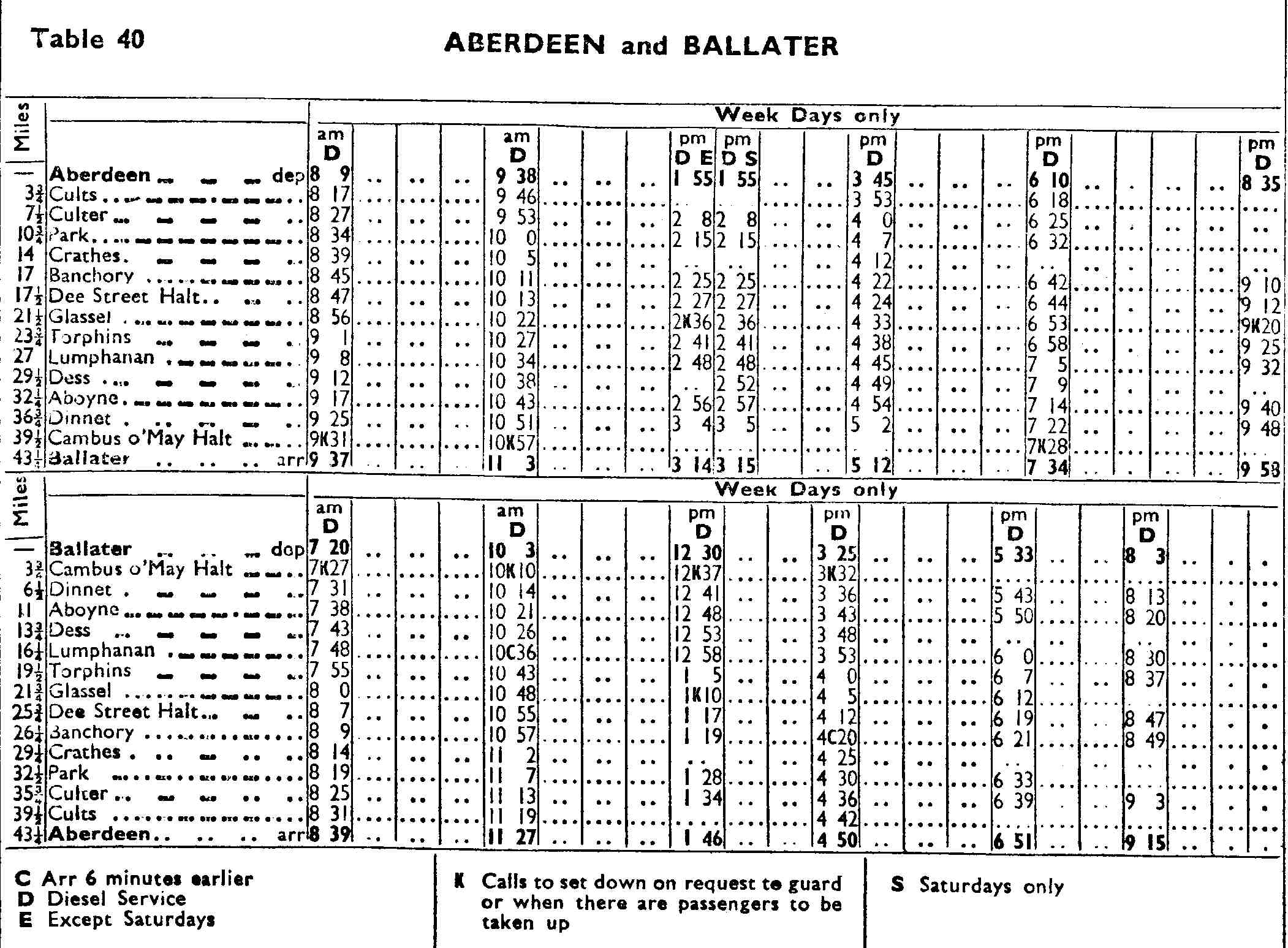
Deeside line timetable, summer 1963

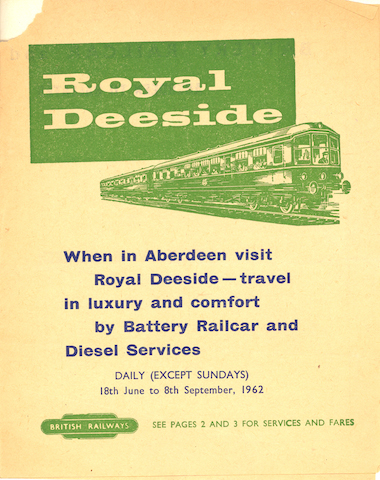
Leaflet advertising train services on the Deeside line, 1962

Banchory railway station was situated on the Aberdeen and Ballater branch (the Deeside Line). It was situated at 16 miles 72 chains (27.2 km) from Aberdeen, and was the terminus of the railway from its opening on 8 September 1853 until extension to Aboyne in 1859. The branch was extended to its final terminus at Ballater in 1866.

The station was reconstructed in 1902, and was substantially built, with stone main buildings and generous platform awnings. There was a goods yard on the down side of the line. The station was host to a LNER camping coach in 1935 and 1936, possibly one for some of 1934 and two coaches from 1937 to 1939. At least part of the station buildings were used to provide camping apartment accommodation for holidaymakers from sometime in the 1950s until the early 1960s, there was accommodation for four people.

By the time of closure all passenger services on the branch were worked by diesel multiple-unit trains, after an experiment with battery-electric railcars in 1958 – 1962. Latterly there were five passenger services in each direction, with an additional train in the summer months. The passenger service was withdrawn from 28 February 1966, and goods services continued until final closure on 18 July 1966.

In 1961, towards the end of the line's life, an additional halt was opened at Dee Street, about 800 yards (730 m) west of Banchory station and closer to the High Street and the town centre.

The Royal Deeside Railway, a heritage line, have established an operating base at Milton of Crathes about three miles east of Banchory, and are working to extend their line into the town.

== Routes ==
Preceding station	Historical railways	Following station
Crathes; Line mostly closed, partially open as a heritage line, station closed	Great North of Scotland Railway; Deeside Railway	Dee Street Halt; Line and station closed
