= Banchory Town Hall =

Municipal building in Banchory, Scotland

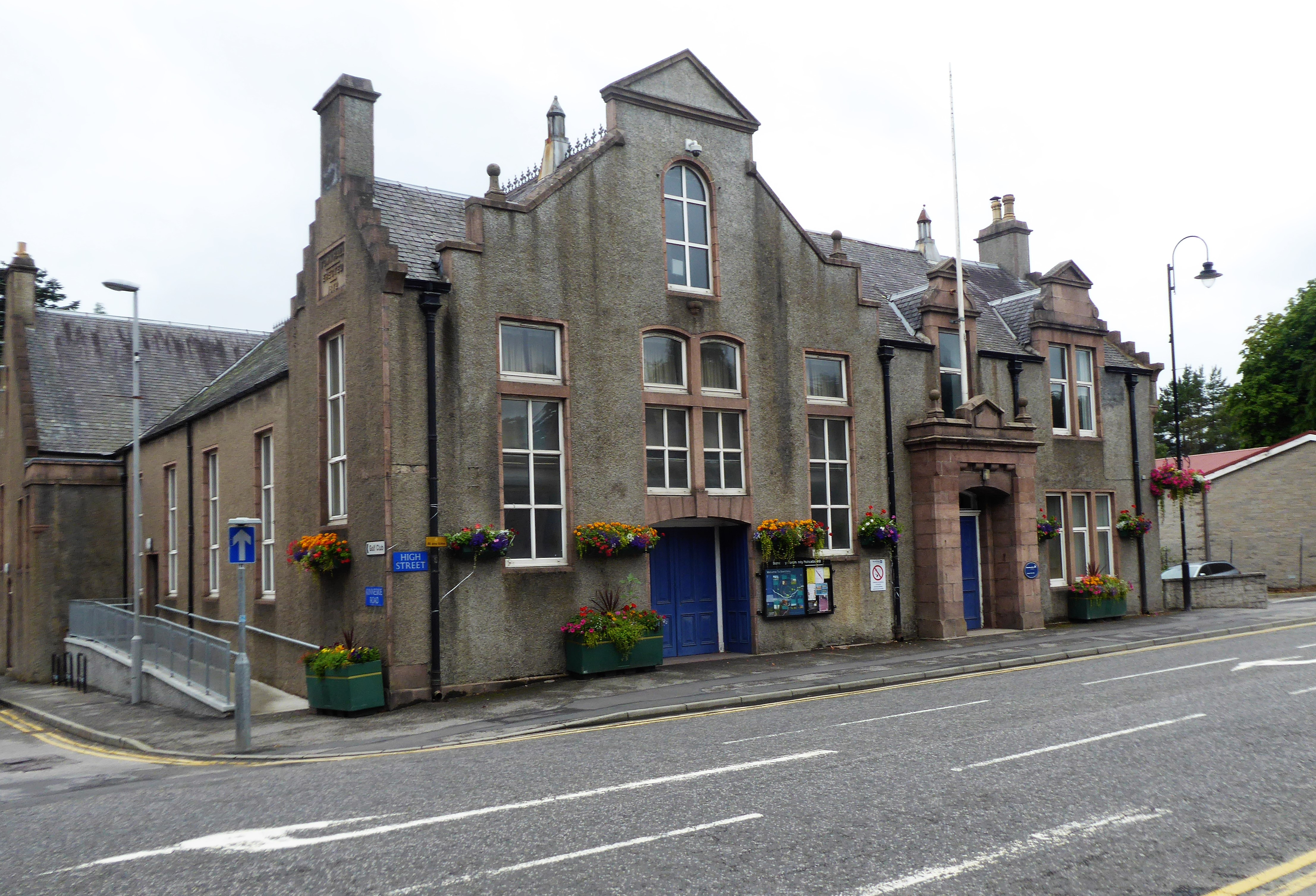
- Banchory Town Hall

- Shown in Aberdeenshire
- 57.0515°N 2.5064°W
- Location: High Street, Banchory

History
- Built: 1873

Site notes
- Architect: James Thomson
- Architectural style: Renaissance style

Banchory Town Hall is a municipal structure in the High Street, Banchory, Aberdeenshire, Scotland. The structure is primarily used as a community events venue.

== History ==
The foundation stone for the town hall, which was financed by public subscription, was laid by the Grand Master of the Aberdeen Provincial Grand Lodge of Freemasons, Robert Beveridge, in January 1873. It was designed by James Thomson in the Renaissance style, built in brick with a rendered finish and sandstone ashlar dressings, and was completed later in 1873.

The design involved an asymmetrical main frontage with five bays facing onto the High Street; the left-hand section of three bays, which was gabled, featured a central archway with a keystone on the ground floor, a pair of segmental transomed casement windows flanked by square headed transomed casement windows on the first floor, and a single round headed casement window in the gable. The fourth bay from the left featured a porch, formed by a pair of brick pillars supporting an entablature with a small central pediment and finials, on the ground floor, and a single casement window surmounted by a shaped pediment on the first floor. The right-hand bay was fenestrated by a three-part mullioned window on the ground floor and by a two-part mullioned window surmounted by a shaped pediment on the first floor. Internally, the principal room was a large assembly hall designed for concerts and theatrical performances.

A social club and a public library were established in the town hall in 1893 and, in April 1900, the town hall showed a silent film about the work of the 5th (Deeside Highland) Volunteer Battalion of the Gordon Highlanders. A war memorial, designed by William Kelly in the form of an obelisk surmounted by four columns and a pyramid-shaped roof, which was intended to commemorate the lives of local service personnel who had died in the First World War, was unveiled in front of the town hall by Colonel James Burnett in August 1923.

The building continued to serve as the meeting place of the burgh council for much of the 20th century, but ceased to be the local seat of government when the enlarged Kincardine and Deeside District Council was formed in 1975. Kincardine and Deeside District Council transferred ownership of the town hall to Banchory Town Council in the mid-1980s and, following the change of ownership, the main role of the town hall remained that of a community events venue.
