= Milking croon of South Uist =

Gaelic milking song

The Milking Croon from South Uist is a milking song - or a cow's lullaby - originally in the Gaelic language, from the island of South Uist, Scotland. It was claimed to have been sung to calm cows during milking, especially if their calf had died. It was recorded with music in 1703.

The lyrics are as follows:
Il a bho-lag-ain il bho m'agh-an
Il a bho-lag-ain il bho m'agh-an
Il a bho-lag-ain il bho m'agh-an
Mo chrodh laoigh air gach taobh an abh-ainn.

Eel-a vo-la-kin eel vo ma-an
Eel-a vo-la-kin eel vo ma-an
Eel-a vo-la-kin eel vo ma-an
Mó-chró lur air guch turv an a-van.
