= Banchory Academy =

Location
- Schoolhill; Banchory, Kincardineshire, AB31 5TQ; Scotland
- Coordinates: 57.052484°N 2.492575°W

Information
- Type: Secondary school
- Motto: Latin: Ex intelligentia vires (From understanding comes strength)
- Rector: Judith Wight
- Gender: Co-educational
- Age: 11 to 18
- Enrolment: 813
- Houses: Kerloch, Lochton, Monearn, Ternan
- Colour: Burgundy
- School years: S1-S6
- Website: Banchory Academy

Banchory Academy is a secondary school serving Banchory, Scotland and surroundings, including the neighbouring communities of Raemoir, Crathes, Strachan, Drumoak, Durris, Inchmarlo and Glassel. The current school roll is around 800 pupils.

== Rector ==
Banchory Academy's current rector is Judith Wight.

== Academic performance ==
Banchory Academy regularly ranks amongst the top 25 state schools in Scotland, performing consistently well in SQA examinations. In 2019, Banchory Academy was ranked as the highest performing state school in Aberdeenshire and the 12th highest performing state secondary school in Scotland, with 62% of Banchory Academy pupils obtaining at least 5 SCQF level 6 awards.

A consistently above average proportion of pupils remain at school for fifth and sixth year to take National 5, Higher and Advanced Higher courses. The HM Inspectors of Education report in 2006 judged school accommodation as being 'weak', noting that it was insufficient for the rising school roll. All other school quality indicators were rated 'good', 'very good' or 'excellent'.

However, since 2019, overall student attainment performance has continued to worsen; this is reflected in a drop in The Times' 2024 school league tables to 48th position across Scotland.

== Banchory Academy in the news ==
In 2008 turf lawn was laid in the sixth year common room.
