= Banchory =

Town in Aberdeenshire, Scotland

Coordinates: 57.055°N 2.49°W

Banchory: Scottish Gaelic: Beannchar; Scots: Banchry
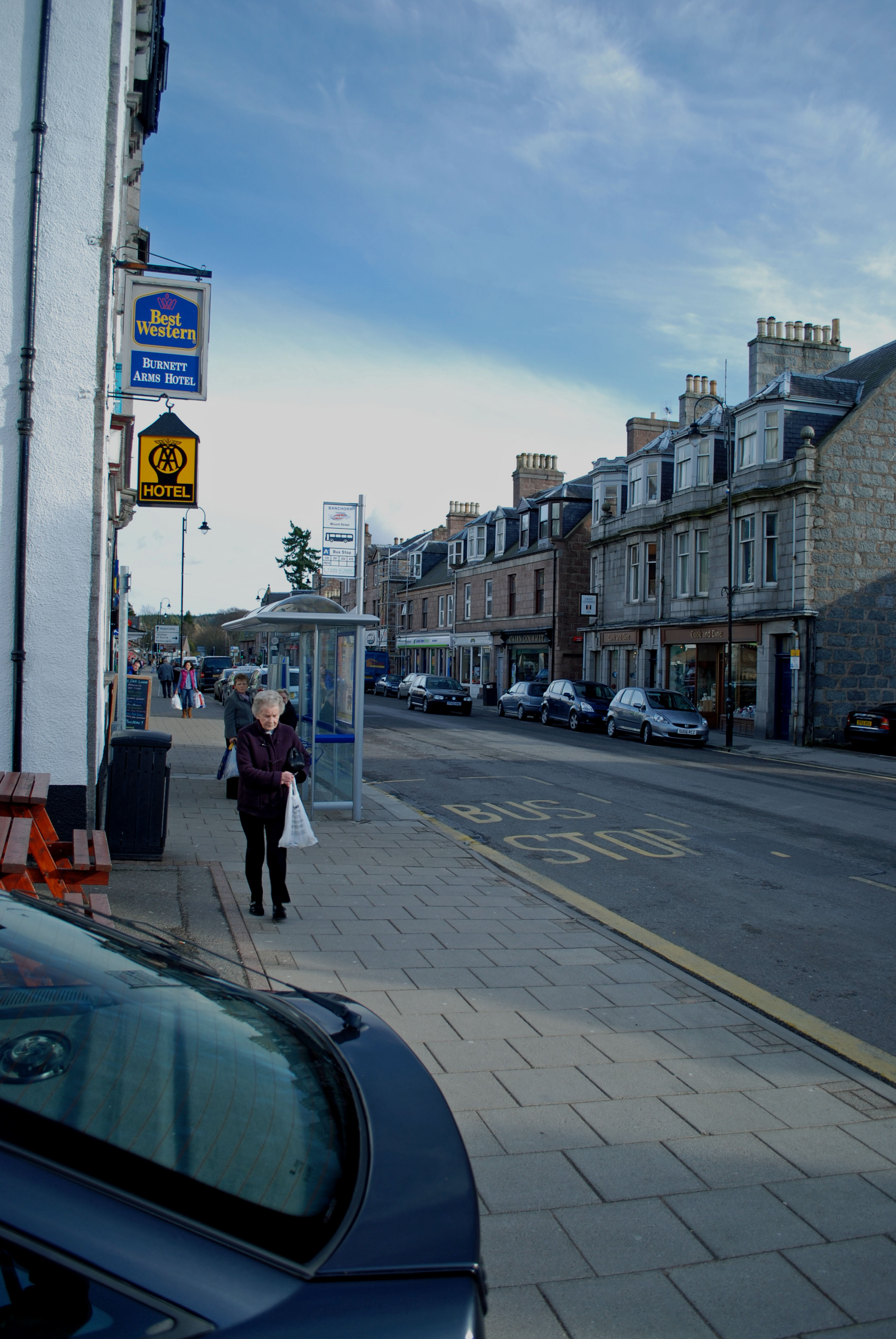
- Banchory High Street

- Location within Aberdeenshire
- Population: 7,440 (2020)
- OS grid reference: NO698958
  - Edinburgh: 109 mi (175 km)
  - London: 521 mi (838 km)
- Council area: Aberdeenshire
- Lieutenancy area: Kincardineshire
- Country: Scotland
- Sovereign state: United Kingdom
- Post town: BANCHORY
- Postcode district: AB31
- Dialling code: 01330
- Police: Scotland
- Fire: Scottish
- Ambulance: Scottish
- UK Parliament: West Aberdeenshire and Kincardine
- Scottish Parliament: Aberdeenshire West

Banchory (/ˈbæŋkəri/, Scots: Banchry, Scottish Gaelic: Beannchar) is a burgh or town in Aberdeenshire, historically in Kincardineshire, Scotland. It is about 18 miles (29 km) west of Aberdeen, near where the River Feugh meets the River Dee.

== Prehistory and archaeology ==
In 2009, a farmer discovered a short cist burial to the east of the town. Archaeologists were called into excavate it and they found that it was a burial from the Beaker culture. Radiocarbon dating put the burial at sometime between 2330 and 2040 BC. Stable isotope analysis of the human remains indicated that he or she grew up on basalt geology, like that of the region, or on chalk, meaning they were either local or could have come from another place, like Yorkshire. Residue analysis of the Beaker pot found in the burial established that it had held either butter or milk.

== History ==
The name is thought to be derived from an early Christian settlement founded by St Ternan. It is claimed that Ternan was a follower of St Ninian. Tradition has it that he established his settlement on the banks of the River Dee on what was later to become the kirkyard of the medieval parish of Banchory-Ternan. The village and parish retained the name until the 1970s. The original Gaelic form is almost identical to that of Bangor, of similar meaning, and also the site of a monastery, in Northern Ireland. Relics associated with St. Ternan were preserved by hereditary keepers at Banchory until the Scottish Reformation. Two early Christian cross-slabs survive in or near the old churchyard on the site of the early church. One is built into a corner of the morthouse in the churchyard, and shows two crosses incised in a worn pink granite slab. The other is a ringed cross in relief built into the wall facing the main road outside the churchyard.

Glen o' Dee Hospital was the first sanitorium to be built in Scotland. It was designed by George Coutts of Aberdeen and opened in 1900. It was constructed mainly of timber with a central tower of Hill of Fare granite. All rooms had balconies and verandas and faced south across the river. Access corridors ran along the north side. A recreation pavilion was later added to the south‑east, below the dining‑hall. On 13 October 2016 the former hospital was destroyed by fire. Two 13-year-old boys were later charged by the police in connection with the blaze.

From 1946 to 1986, lavender fields were in production in Banchory and the industry made the town world famous.

== Overview ==
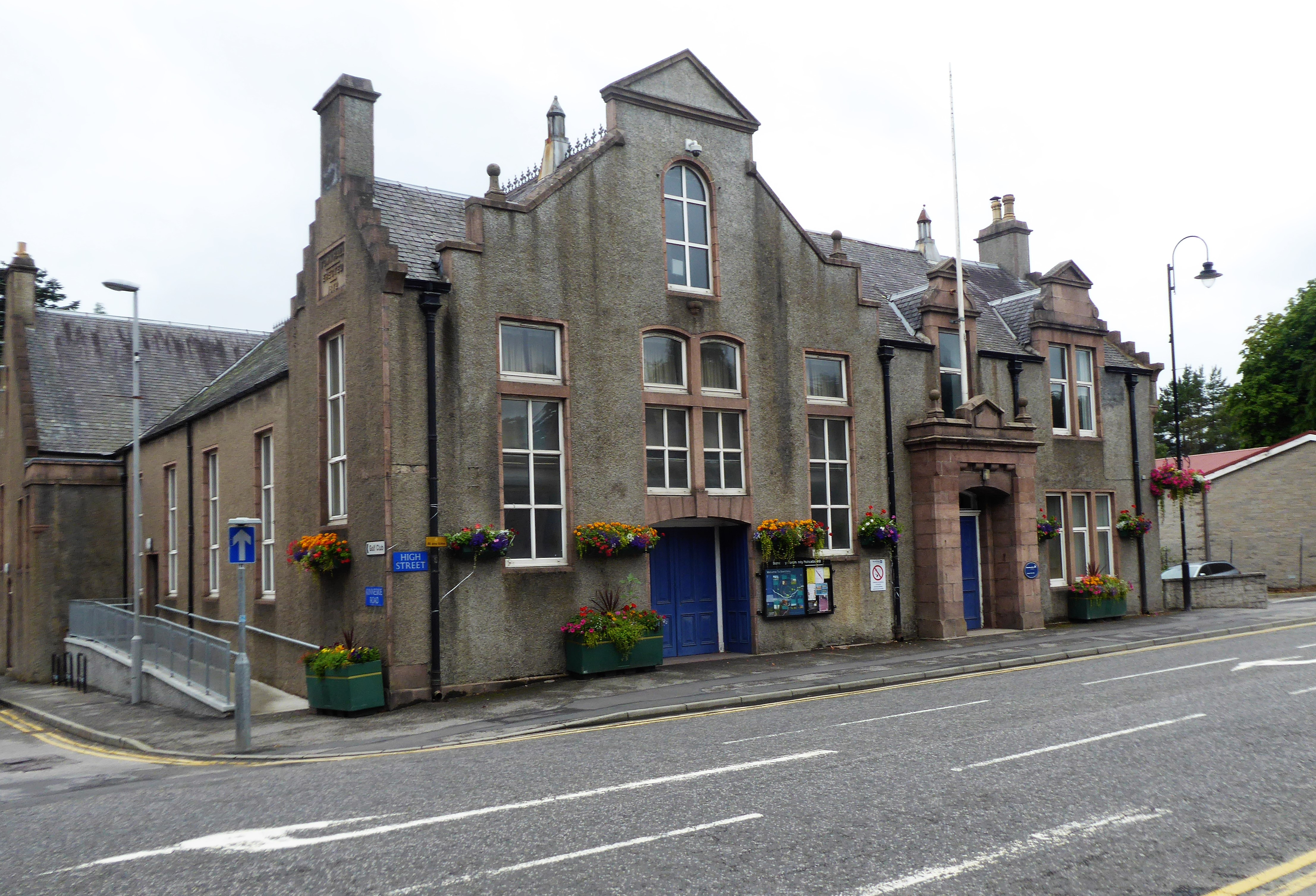
Banchory Town Hall

Banchory is the largest town in the area and has a High Street. There are a number of hotels and restaurants including the Stag Hotel, Scott Skinners Bar and Restaurant, the Burnett Arms, and the Douglas Arms. The shops include newsagents, hairdressers and chemists. Since the 1970s, the town has grown steadily. Since 2001 there has been rapid expansion. A large forested area 'the Hill of Banchory', owned by the Burnett family (owners of Crathes Castle), to the north east of the town has been replaced by a large housing estate and an influx of new residents. The Hill of Banchory primary school was opened in 2006 to cater for the increased population.

Banchory Town Hall was completed in 1873 and the Kinneskie Road drill hall was completed in around 1908.

== Land use ==
Banchory Academy is a state secondary school, with a school roll capacity of 900.

The Banchory Sports Village opened in 2019 within the Hill of Banchory development area, with a 25 m 6-lane swimming pool, gym and sports hall.

== Tourism and culture ==
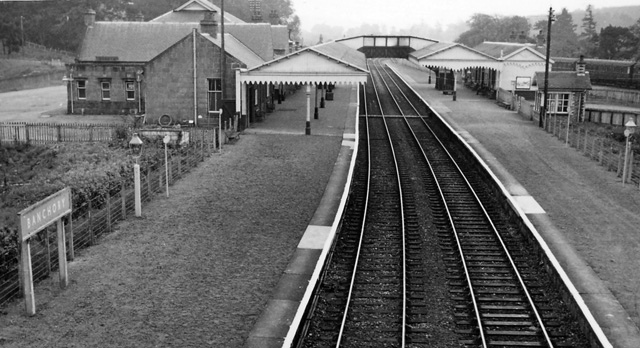
Until 1966 Banchory had a railway station on the Aberdeen to Ballater line

Banchory is known as the Gateway to Royal Deeside. Banchory River Festival used to be held every June: the main event is held on the Saturday in the Bellfield Park, Banchory.The Banchory show is held every July: there is an Agricultural Show, Dog Show, Craft Fair, Highland Dancing Competition and the Scolty Hill Race, as well as traditional fairground stalls and games.

Banchory Tartan was added to the Scottish Register of Tartans in 2025, its design based on colours found around the town.

Scotland's only Rum distillery, Dark Matter Distillers, is located on the outskirts of Banchory.

== Transports ==
In 1853 Banchory railway station was opened on the Deeside Railway. The station was closed by British Rail in 1966. The town is on the Deeside Way, a shared pedestrian and cycle path which runs along the trackbed of the former Deeside Railway.

In 2017, the Banchory town service 205 was withdrawn. An internal bus was re-introduced in 2020.

== Notable people ==
- Sir John Macqueen Cowan (1891–1960), botanist
- James Scott Skinner (1843–1927), fiddler and composer
- Andrew Lang (1844 - 1912), anthropologist, folklorist, writer, Fellow of the British Academy lived in the town in his final years.
- Caroline Phillips (1874–1956), Scottish suffragette and journalist, who owned Banchory Station Hotel 1912 to 1940s
- Pete Cashmore (born 1985), founder of technology blog Mashable
- Ben Kilner (born 1988), snowboarder, Winter Olympian
- Norman Douglas (1868–1952), Scottish novelist and travel writer
- Andrew Considine (born 1987), Scottish international footballer
- Calum Bowie (born 2000), Scottish singer-songwriter
- Roger Cruickshank (born 1982), Scottish downhill skier, pilot, and author

== See also ==
- Banchory Ternan East Church
- Cluny Crichton Castle, a ruined tower house just north of Banchory.
- Glen o' Dee Hospital
