= Plaidy railway station =

Former railway station in Scotland

Plaidy
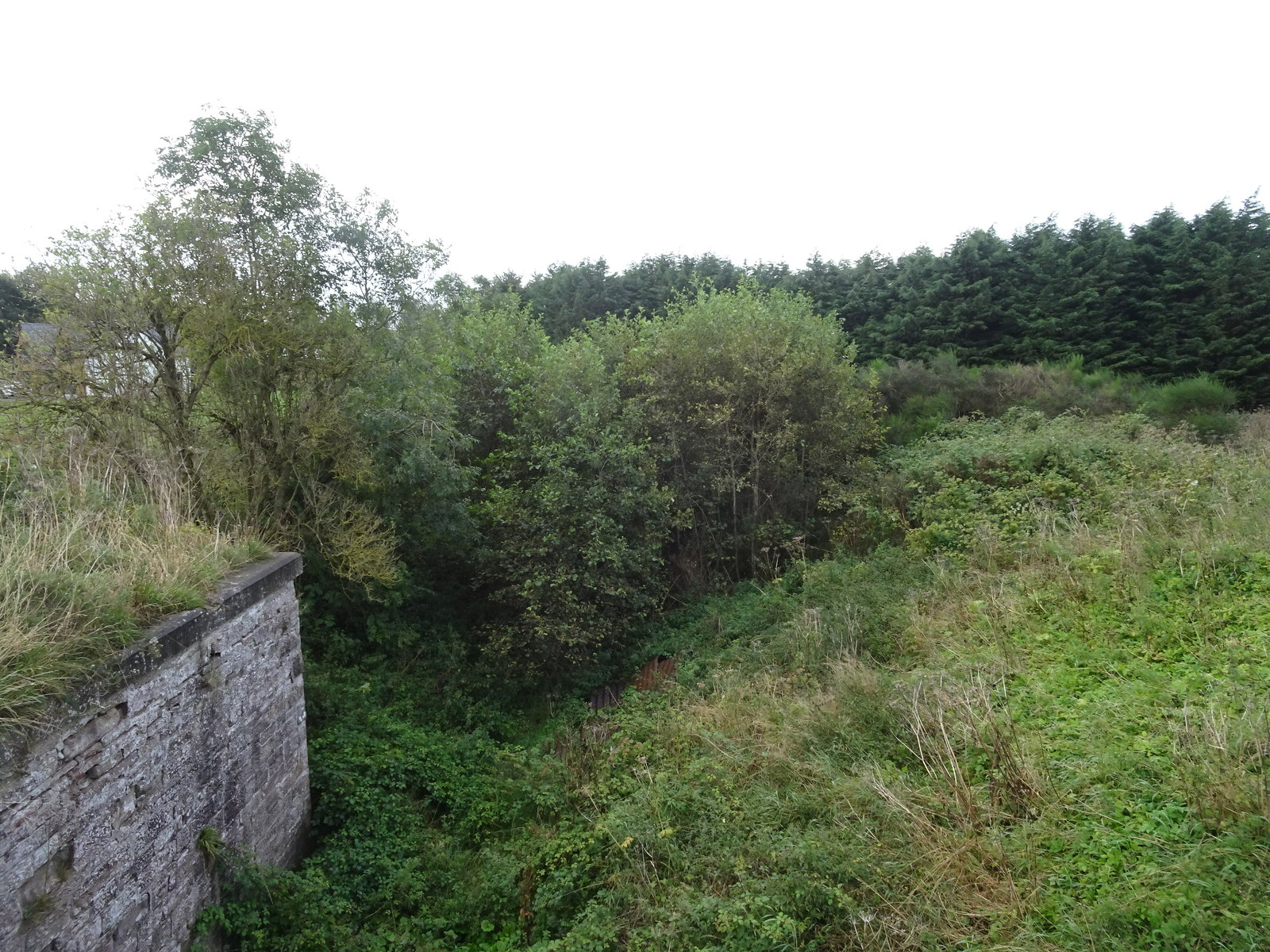
- View towards the site of Plaidy station

General information
- Location: Plaidy, Aberdeenshire; Scotland
- Coordinates: 57.583°N 2.454°W
- Grid reference: NJ 729 549
- Platforms: 1

Other information
- Status: Disused

History
- Original company: Banff, Macduff and Turriff Junction Railway
- Pre-grouping: Great North of Scotland Railway

Key dates
- 4 June 1860: Opened to passengers
- 22 May 1944: Closed to passengers and goods
- 1 August 1961: Line closed entirely
Location

Plaidy railway station was a railway station at Plaidy, Aberdeenshire, Scotland on the rural branchline to Macduff. It was opened in 1860 by the Banff, Macduff and Turriff Junction Railway and closed in 1944. Plaidy was 22 miles (35 km) from the junction at Inveramsay and 245 feet (75 m) above sea level.

== History ==
The station served the needs of the local farms such as Parkside, Plaidy and Lower Plaidy as well as the Mill of Plaidy, a carding mill situated on the Burn of Craigston, about 1/2 mile (800 m) from Plaidy railway station. One of the stationmasters or agents, as the GNoSR referred to them, was James Minto. James transferred to the larger station at Auchterless. At first most trains called at Plaidy. The station and goods yard were closed by the LNER on the 22 May 1944, but the line remained open until 1961.

== Infrastructure ==
The station was on a single track section of line without a crossing loop or signalbox. A goods yard was present with two sidings, loading platforms, a weighing machine and several small buildings. The single platform lay on the west side of the line and a simple shelter was present. A likely stationmaster's house and other railway related buildings were located nearby. An overbridge lay nearby on the route to Macduff that has now been demolished.

== The site today ==
The goods yard buildings and platform were demolished and the site is now occupied by a private dwelling.

Preceding station	Disused railways	Following station
Turriff; Line and station closed	Great North of Scotland Railway; Banff, Macduff and Turriff Extension Railway	King Edward; Line and station closed
