= King Edward railway station =

Former railway station in Scotland

King Edward
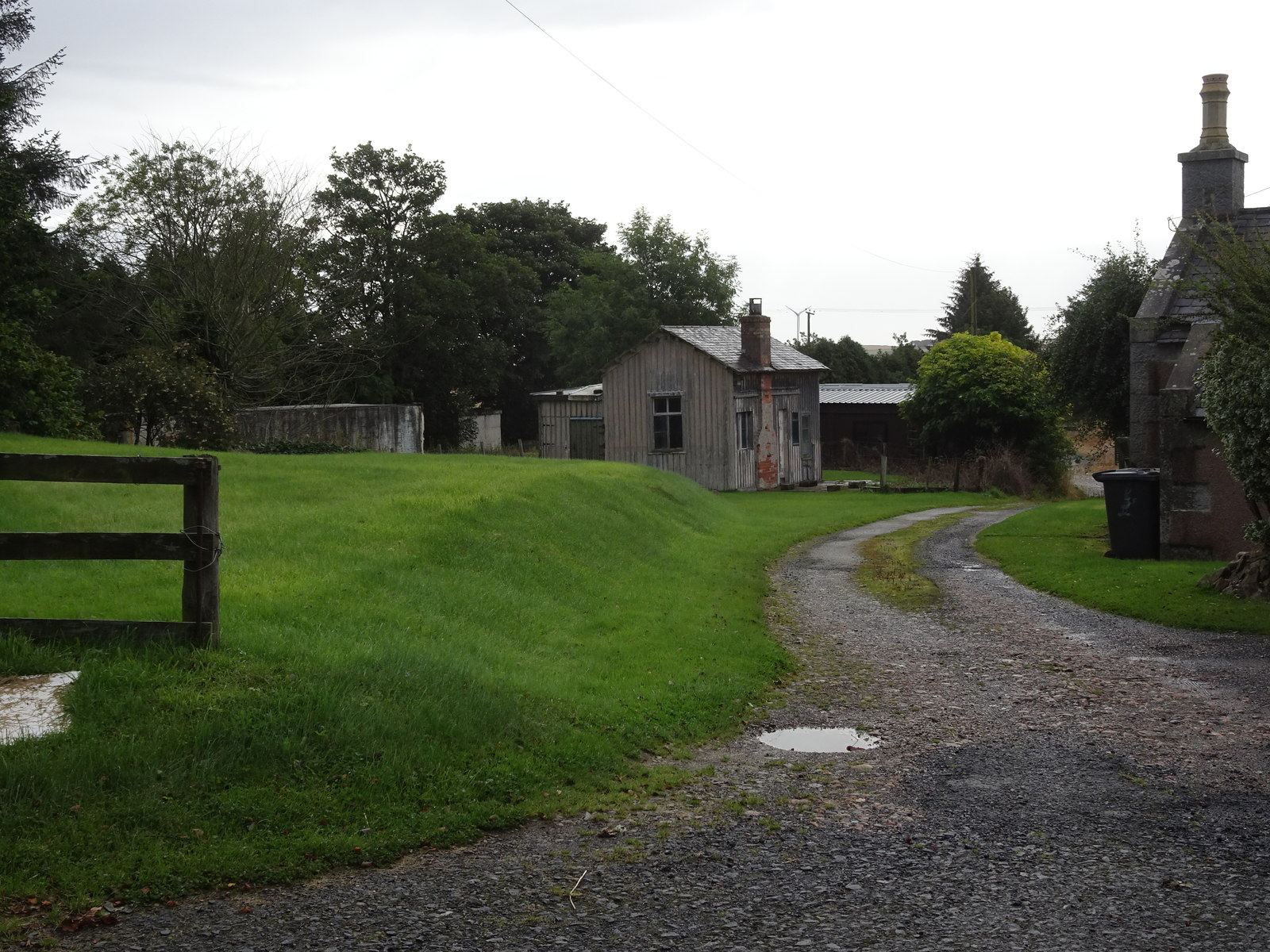
- King Edward railway station in 2019

General information
- Location: Turriff, Aberdeenshire; Scotland
- Coordinates: 57.6102°N 2.4759°W
- Grid reference: NJ 716 578
- Platforms: 2 (1 from 1954)

Other information
- Status: Disused

History
- Original company: Banff, Macduff and Turriff Junction Railway
- Pre-grouping: Great North of Scotland Railway

Key dates
- 4 June 1860: Opened to passengers
- 1 March 1861: Opened to goods
- 1 October 1951: Closed to passengers and goods
- 1 August 1961: Closed to goods
Location

King Edward railway station was a railway station at King Edward, King Edward Parish, Aberdeenshire, Scotland on the rural branchline to Macduff. It was opened in 1860 to passengers by the Banff, Macduff and Turriff Junction Railway and was closed to regular passenger traffic in 1951. King Edward was 24 miles 42 chains (39.5 km) from the junction at Inveramsay and 247 feet (75 m) above sea level.

== History ==
The name "King Edward" originated from the Scottish Gaelic. The first element "King" or "kin" comes from "Ceann" meaning a headland and "Edward" may refer to "cathair-thalmhainn" that is a "Yarrow" plant in English. Another interpretation is "Head of the Valley". The hamlet where the station was located is now known as "Balchers".

The station served the needs of the local farms in Buchan midway between Turriff and Banff, as well as the King Edward School that stood nearby as did the church and church hall. Passenger services were withdrawn after 30 September 1951. A rail tour visited on 13 June 1960.

== Infrastructure ==
The main station buildings stood on the northern side of the single track line. At first the station only had a single platform, however a passing loop and a second platform were added in 1895. King Edward's signalbox stood on the northern platform on the Plaidy end and was opened on 29 April 1895 and closed on 6 January 1936 when it was replaced by a ground frame. A station house and cottage stood near the church hall.

The station had a pedestrian overbridge and a wooden shelter stood on the southern platform. A road overbridge stood over the line to Plaidy. The goods yard was to the south and was approached from that side; it did not have a crane, but a weighing machine was provided. Two sidings were present with a loading dock.

By 1954 the loop, footbridge and second platform had been removed, however the goods sidings were still in use.

== The site today ==
The station building survives as do some of the railway associated cottages.

Preceding station	Disused railways	Following station
Plaidy; Line and station closed	Great North of Scotland Railway; Banff, Macduff and Turriff Extension Railway	Macduff (Banff); Line and station closed
Plaidy; Line and station closed	Great North of Scotland Railway; Banff, Macduff and Turriff Extension Railway	Banff Bridge; Line and station closed
