= Wartle railway station =

Railway station in Aberdeenshire, Scotland

Wartle
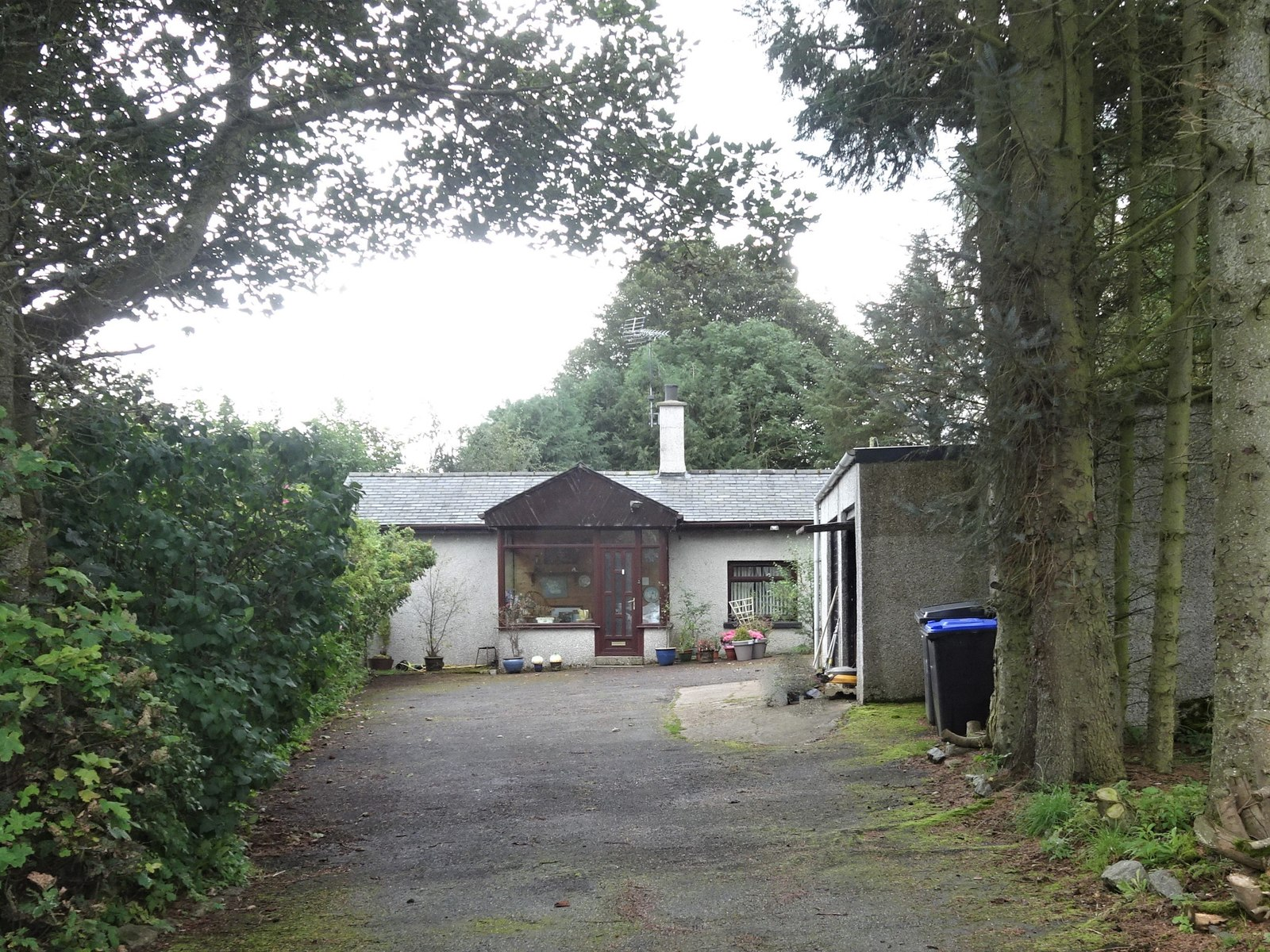

General information
- Location: Wartle, Aberdeenshire; Scotland
- Coordinates: 57.360°N 2.467°W
- Grid reference: NJ720301
- Platforms: 1

Other information
- Status: Disused

History
- Original company: Banff, Macduff and Turriff Junction Railway
- Pre-grouping: Great North of Scotland Railway

Key dates
- 5 September 1857: Opened to passengers and goods
- 1 October 1951: Closed to passengers
- 10 August 1964: Closed to goods
Location

Wartle railway station was a railway station that served local farms and the nearby hamlet of Meikle Wartle, Aberdeenshire. It was opened in 1857 by the Banff, Macduff and Turriff Junction Railway, later part of the Great North of Scotland Railway, then the LNER and finally British Railways, on the 29 3/4-mile (47.9 km) long branchline from Inveramsay to Macduff. The station closed to regular passenger services in 1951 and to goods traffic in 1964.

== History ==
The station was the first of the intermediate stations on the branch and lay 3 miles 48 chains (5.8 km) from the junction of the line at Inveramsay. It was on the original 1857 section of the line, the line being extended to Macduff on 4 June 1860. A post office stood nearby close to the level crossing. It lay at 352 feet (107 m) above sea level.

== Infrastructure ==
Wartle did not have a signal box, but photographs show that signals were present in later days. The single platform stood on the north-east side of the track and the line was single track. The station and station house were brick built in a 'U' shape with the front centre area covered at the front by a canopy. To the north-west of the station lay a level crossing. To the south-west was a goods yard with a goods shed approached from the south-east. Several building stood in and close to the goods yard. A loading dock lay parallel to one of the sidings.

== Remains ==
The station may survive as a private house however the buildings may have been demolished or greatly altered.

== Services ==
Fisherwives from 1863 paid only a single fare and half to any station on the line from Macduff, except for Wartle. From 1926 Sunday excursion trains from Aberdeen were advertised and from 1938 they appeared in the timetables. One on 11 June 1927 ran on a Saturday and the return fare, Third Class, to Macduff was 3s. 0d. In 1932 passenger trains stopped at all the stations with five a day in each direction. Although regular passengers services ceased in 1951 a SLS/RCTS Joint Scottish Tour visited the branch and ran as far as Turriff on 13 June 1960 and another excursion ran in 1965. By 1948 four return trips a day were made as the coal supply situation had improved. Another severe coal shortage occurred in 1951 and the passenger service ceased despite protests, with services withdrawn after 30 September 1951.

| Preceding station | Disused railways | Following station |
|---|---|---|
| Inveramsay; Line and Station closed | Great North of Scotland Railway; Banff, Macduff and Turriff Junction Railway | Rothienorman; Line and Station closed |
