= Fyvie railway station =

Former railway station in Scotland

Fyvie
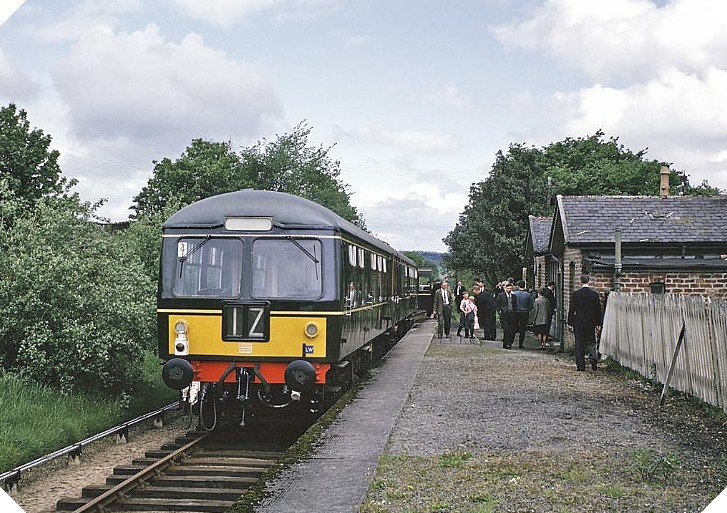
- Excursion at Fyvie in 1964.

General information
- Location: Fyvie, Aberdeenshire; Scotland
- Coordinates: 57.441°N 2.405°W
- Grid reference: NJ757390
- Platforms: 2

Other information
- Status: Disused

History
- Original company: Banff, Macduff and Turriff Junction Railway
- Pre-grouping: Great North of Scotland Railway
- Post-grouping: London and North Eastern Railway

Key dates
- 5 September 1857: Station opened
- 1 October 1951: Station closed to passengers
- 3 January 1966: Station closed to goods
- 1966: Line closed entirely
Location

Fyvie railway station was a railway station near Fyvie, Aberdeenshire. It served the rural area and Fyvie Castle, but lay about 1 mile (1.6 km) from the village. It was opened in 1857 by the Banff Macduff & Turriff Junction Railway, later part of the Great North of Scotland Railway, then the LNER and finally British Railways. The station was an intermediate stop on the branchline from Inveramsay to Macduff. The station closed to passengers in 1951 and to goods in 1966. Fyvie derives from the Scots Gaelic Fia chein meaning Deer hill.

== History ==
Opened by the Banff, Macduff and Turriff Junction Railway, then part of the Great North of Scotland Railway it became part of the London and North Eastern Railway during the Grouping of 1923, passing on to the Scottish Region of British Railways during the nationalisation of 1948. It was then closed by British Railways.

== Infrastructure ==
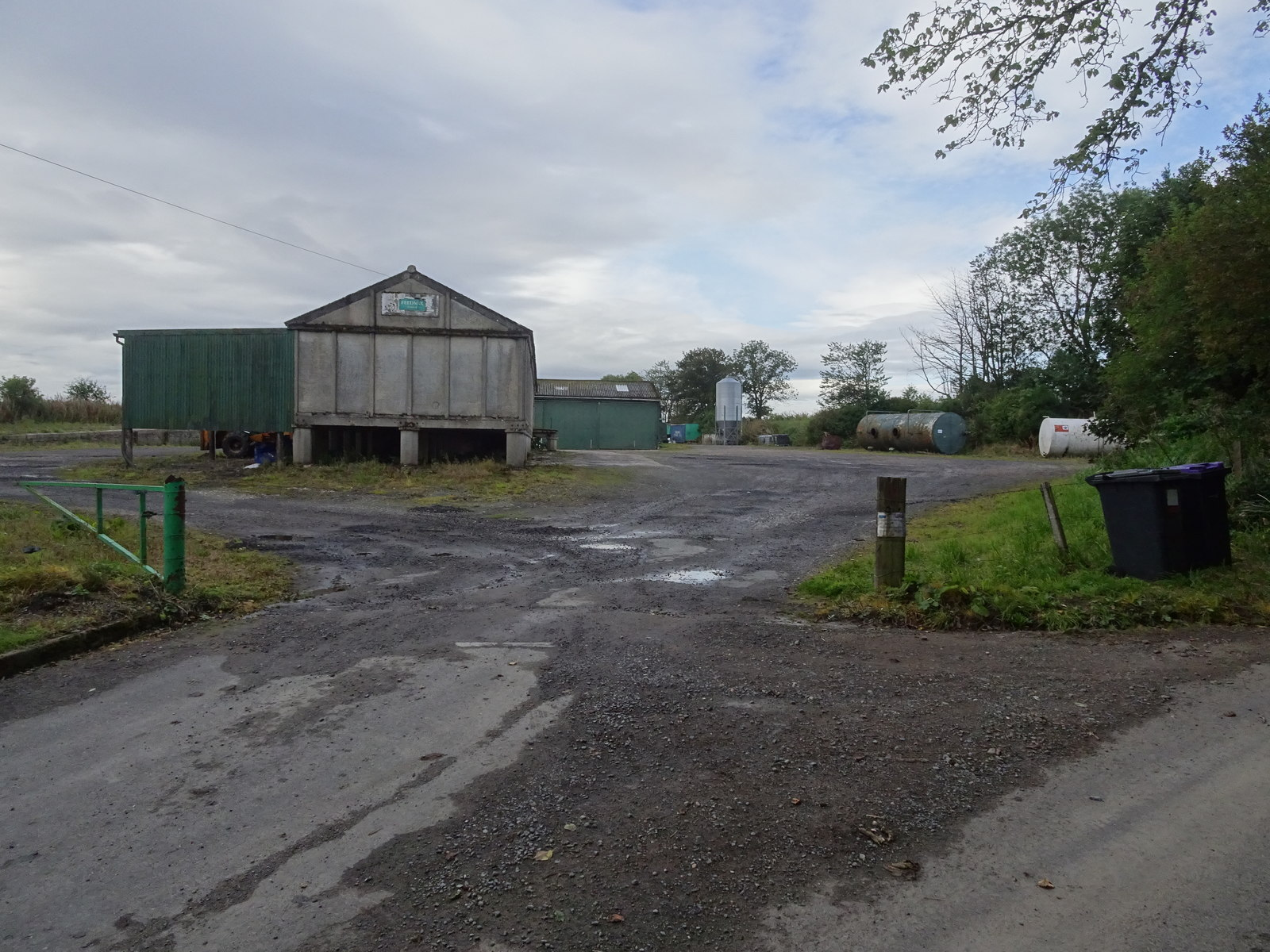
The old goods yard.

The station lay 10.47 miles (16.85 km) from Inveramsay and stood at 242 feet (74 m) above sea level. The signal box was opened on 15 April 1895 and was closed on 5 October 1936 when it was replaced by a ground frame. The station originally had two stone built platforms with a small wooden shelter on one side and a typical brick built ticket office and waiting room on the other, original, southbound platform. A footbridge crossed the passing loop to the south of the station buildings. The passing loop and second platform were closed in 1936 to save on maintenance costs and had been removed by 1952. A single short siding lay to the north on the eastern side of the single track line that was intended for use in catching any runaway wagons as the gradient from Rothienorman was 1 in 80.

The goods yard with several ancillary buildings lay to the east and was approached from the south where the road was crossed by an overbridge. It had a weighing machine, a goods shed, loading dock and four sidings in all. Several station houses and a police station stood nearby. The line was cut back to Turiff in 1961. The market stance stood on the east side of the goods yard.

== Remains ==
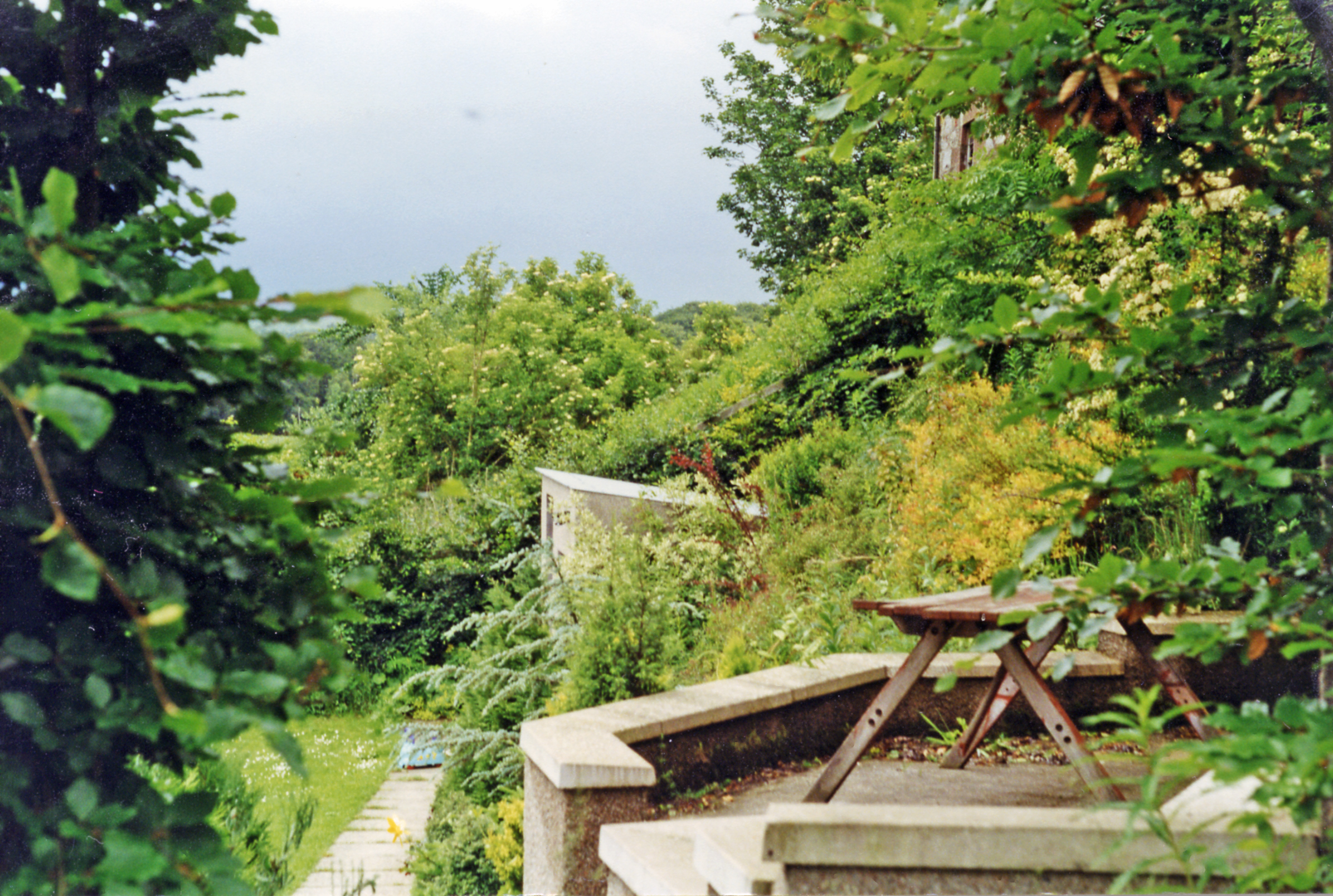
View towards Aberdeen at the old station site.

A goods shed remains and at the entry to the old goods yard an interesting old railway building survives, similar to one at Oldmeldrum.

== Services ==
From 1926 Sunday excursion trains from Aberdeen were advertised and from 1938 they appeared in the timetables. In 1932 passenger trains stopped at all the stations with five a day in each direction. Although regular passengers services ceased in 1951 a SLS/RCTS Joint Scottish Tour visited Turriff on 13 June 1960 and another excursion ran in 1965. In WWII fuel oil was transported to Turriff and was then piped to Ministry of Defence storage tanks which supplied local airfields. By 1948 four return trips a day were made as the coal supply situation had improved. Another severe coal shortage occurred in 1951 and the passenger service ceased despite protests, with services withdrawn after 30 September 1951. All trains stopped at Fyfie.

In 1906 the King and Queen of Spain stayed at Fyvie Castle at the invitation of Lord Leith and used the station for their journeys.

Preceding station	Disused railways	Following station
Rothienorman; Line and Station closed	Great North of Scotland Railway; Banff, Macduff and Turriff Junction Railway	Auchterless; Line and Station closed

== Rothiebrisbane Farm Platform ==
In 1918 a special timber platform was erected at Rothiebrisbane Farm one mile south of Fyvie. The occasion was a shorthorn cattle sale and the excursion train had to pull forward more than once to allow passengers to disembark. Rothiebrisbane Platform railway station was only in use for five hours and five minutes. Temporary platform construction was not unusual, but a single use for such a short one off use was exceptional.
