= Turriff railway station =

Former railway station in Scotland

Turriff
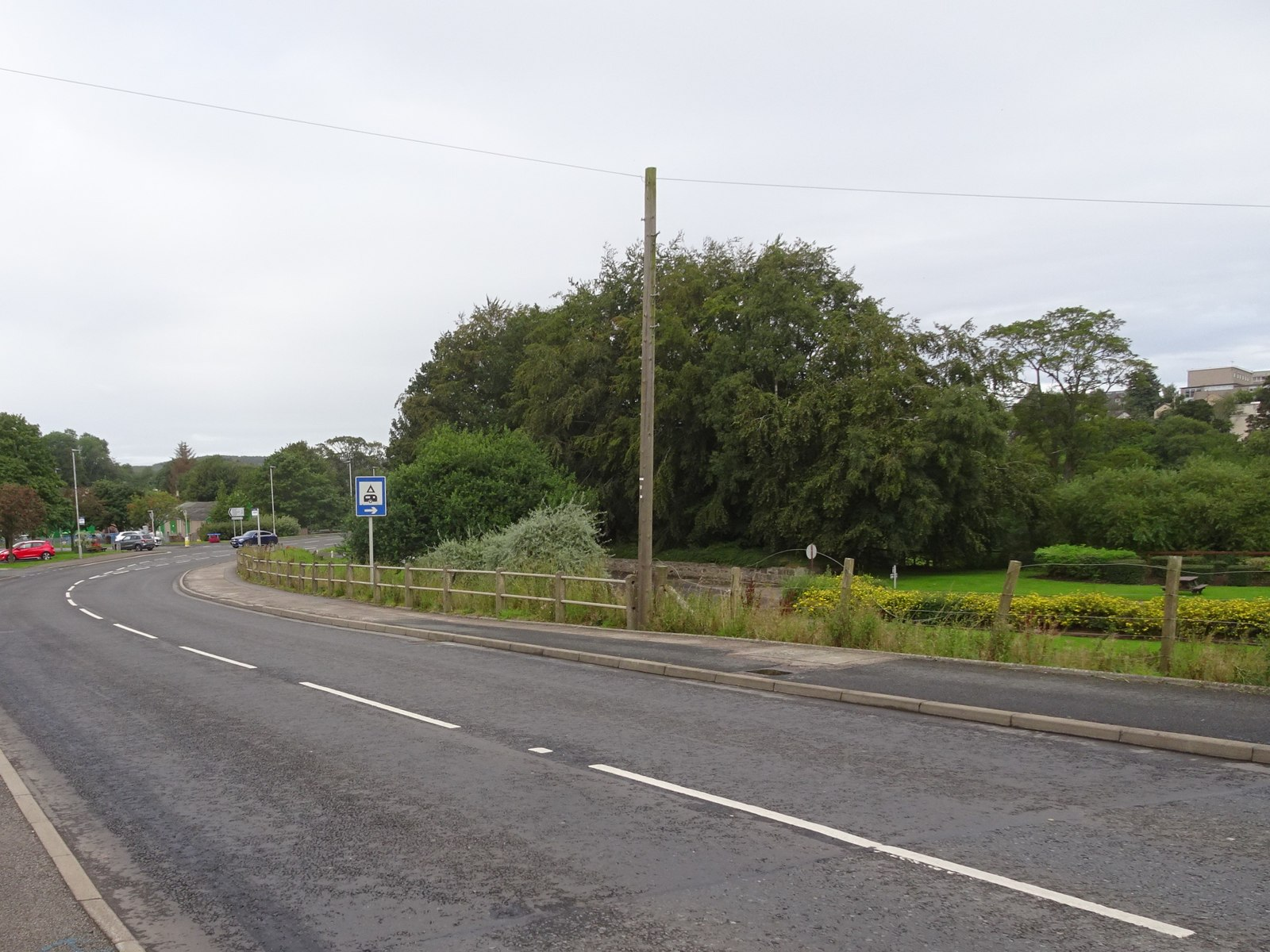

General information
- Location: Turriff, Aberdeenshire; Scotland
- Coordinates: 57.5334°N 2.4617°W
- Grid reference: NJ724493
- Platforms: 2

Other information
- Status: Disused

History
- Original company: Banff, Macduff and Turriff Junction Railway
- Pre-grouping: Great North of Scotland Railway
- Post-grouping: London and North Eastern Railway

Key dates
- 5 September 1857: Opened
- 1 October 1951: Closed to passengers
- 3 January 1966: Closed to goods
Location

Turriff railway station was a railway station in Turriff, Aberdeenshire, Scotland. It was opened in 1857 by the Banff Macduff & Turriff Junction Railway, later part of the Great North of Scotland Railway, then the LNER and finally British Railways, on the branchline from Inveramsay to Macduff, the station closed to passengers in 1951 and to goods in 1966. The town lay to the north.

== History ==
The station was the largest intermediate station on the branch and lay 17 miles 66 chains (28.7 km) from the junction of the line at Inveramsay and 11 miles (18 km) from the terminus of Macduff. It was the original terminus of the line in 1857, however the line was extended to Macduff on 4 June 1860. The name 'Turriff' is Scots Gaelic and may mean 'height, mount or tower'.

Maurice Shand was the relief station master at Turriff during WWII when the station was especially busy. Turriff booking office was struck by lightning on 11 September 1895 and set alight.

== Infrastructure ==
Turiff had two signal boxes, one at either end, that opened on 12 August 1900 and closed on 11 December 1961. One was unusual in being set back from the platform and was approached via a raised walkway giving the signalman a view to the west of the level crossing. The station had two platforms and a passing loop. The platforms at the southern end were built at the time of the extension and were longer and higher. The substantial station buildings stood either side and the associated platform canopies were quite large, joining at the west end and the platforms here were surfaced with wood. A footbridge was present that was a replacement built by the LNER.

A road over bridge crossed the line to the north. The Turriff Steam Mill, a corn mill, was served by a siding. Approached from the east a large goods shed, cattle pens, a weighing machine and goods yard stood to the south and a locomotive shed and water tower to the north. After closure the west bound platform buildings were partly removed. The turntable, another survival from Turriff's time as a terminus, remained until around 1900. In 1961 the line towards Macduff was closed and the tracks through the station removed, however the goods yard remained and a passing loop was located within the sidings complex. An auction mart and saw mill stood in the immediate area.

== Remains ==
The station cottages remain to the north and south but the re-alignment of the road resulted in the demolition of the station however a section of the platforms survives to the south. The goods yard is now a caravan park and the goods shed still stands. The old goods platforms are still present with associated crane base, etc.

== Services ==
From 1926 Sunday excursion trains from Aberdeen were advertised and from 1938 they appeared in the timetables. In 1932 passenger trains stopped at all the stations with five a day in each direction. Although regular passengers services ceased in 1951 a SLS/RCTS Joint Scottish Tour visited Turriff on 13 June 1960 and another excursion ran in 1965. In WWII fuel oil was transported to Turriff and was then piped to Ministry of Defence storage tanks which supplied local airfields. By 1948 four return trips a day were made as the coal supply situation had improved. Another severe coal shortage occurred in 1951 and the passenger service ceased despite protests, with services withdrawn after 30 September 1951.

Preceding station	Disused railways	Following station
Auchterless; Line and station closed	Great North of Scotland Railway; Banff, Macduff and Turriff Junction Railway; Banff, Macduff and Turriff Extension Railway	Plaidy; Line and station closed
