= Auchterless railway station =

Disused railway station in Aberdeenshire, Scotland

Auchterless
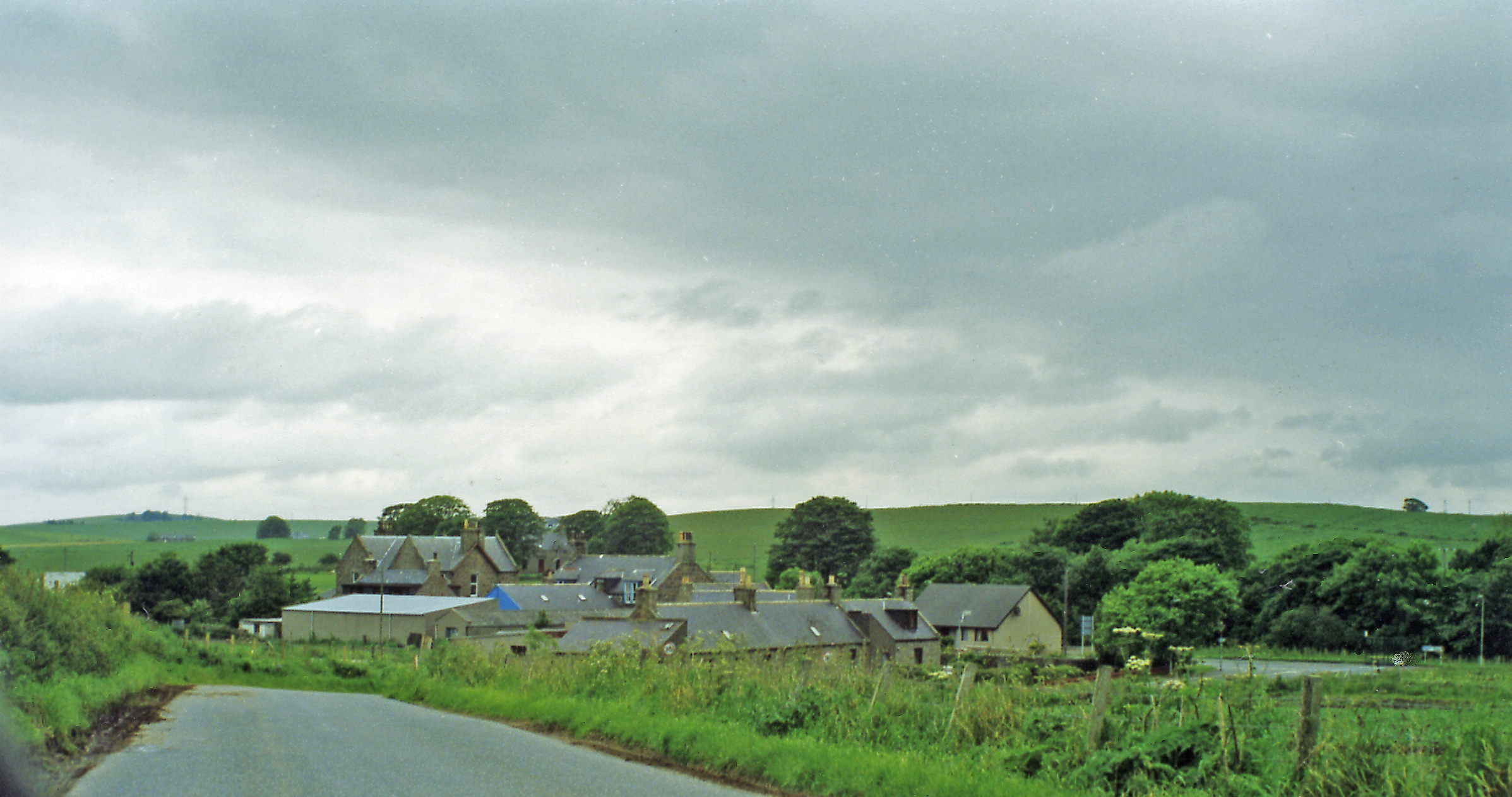
- Site of the station (1997)

General information
- Location: Kirkton of Auchterless, Aberdeenshire; Scotland
- Coordinates: 57.4878°N 2.4243°W
- Grid reference: NJ746443
- Platforms: 2

Other information
- Status: Disused

History
- Original company: Banff, Macduff and Turriff Junction Railway
- Pre-grouping: Great North of Scotland Railway
- Post-grouping: London and North Eastern Railway

Key dates
- 5 September 1857: Station opened
- 1 October 1951: Station closed to passengers
- 10 August 1964: Station closed to goods
- 1966: Line closed entirely
Location

Auchterless railway station was a railway station in Auchterless, Aberdeenshire. It served the rural area, the estate of Towie Barclay and a settlement known as Kirkton of Auchterless stands 3 miles (5 km) away. It was opened in 1857 by the Banff Macduff & Turriff Junction Railway, later part of the Great North of Scotland Railway, then the LNER and finally British Railways, on the branchline from Inveramsay to Macduff, the station closed to passengers in 1951 and to goods in 1966. The station lay below Gallowhill and the town lay to the north-east.

== History ==
Opened by the Banff, Macduff and Turriff Junction Railway, then part of the Great North of Scotland Railway it became part of the London and North Eastern Railway during the Grouping of 1923, passing on to the Scottish Region of British Railways during the nationalisation of 1948. It was then closed by British Railways with passenger services withdrawn after 30 September 1951.

== Infrastructure ==
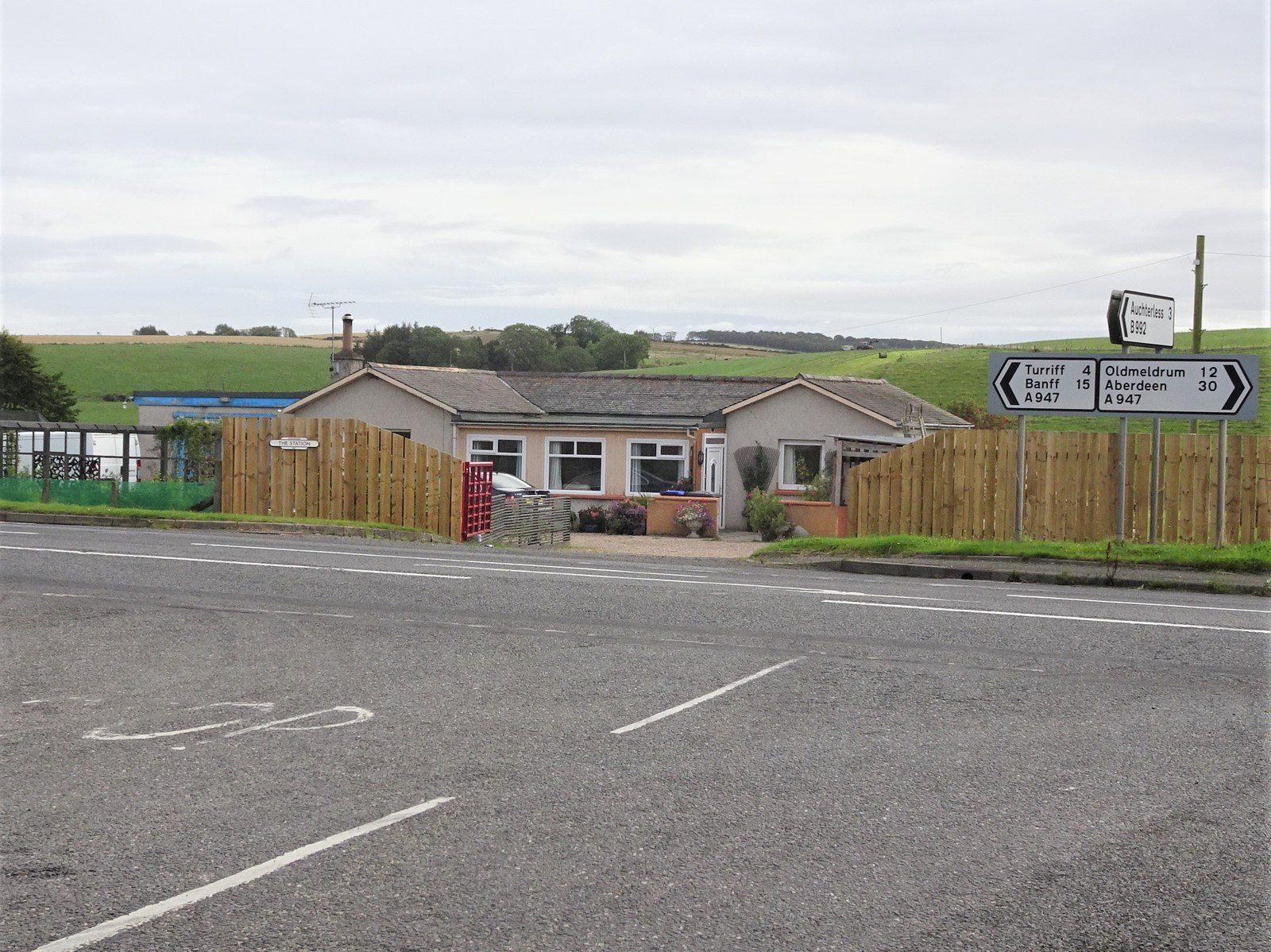
The altered station buildings in 2019

The station lay 14 miles (23 km) from Inveramsay and stood at 170 feet (52 m) above sea level. Two signal boxes were eventually located here, designated 'South' and 'North'. They were both opened on 28 March 1892 and were closed on 28 March 1933. The station originally had two stone built platforms with a small wooden shelter on one side and a typical brick built ticket office and waiting room on the other northbound platform. A footbridge crossed the passing loop to the north of the station buildings, and a signal box stood next to the level crossing. The signal box to the south closed in 1933, whilst the box to the north remained as a gate box for the level crossing until 1966. The passing loop and second platform, footbridge, etc were removed before passenger services ceased to reduce maintenance costs. The station house and cottage stood to the north.

The goods station stood to the south on the western side of the single track line and was approached from the south. The goods yard in 1900 had three sidings, a shed and a loading dock with some ancillary buildings. The goods yard had a 1 long ton 5 cwt (2,800 lb or 1.3 t) crane and a weighing machine.

== Remains ==
The main station survives in altered form as a private dwelling and the railway cottage and house are still present.

== Services ==
From 1926 Sunday excursion trains from Aberdeen were advertised and from 1938 they appeared in the timetables. In 1932 passenger trains stopped at all the stations with five a day in each direction. Although regular passengers services ceased in 1951 a SLS/RCTS Joint Scottish Tour visited Turriff on 13 June 1960 and another excursion ran in 1965. In WWII fuel oil was transported to Turriff and was then piped to Ministry of Defence storage tanks which supplied local airfields. By 1948 four return trips a day were made as the coal supply situation had improved. Another severe coal shortage occurred in 1951 and the passenger service ceased despite protests. All trains stopped at Auchterless.

Preceding station	Disused railways	Following station
Fyvie; Line and station closed	Great North of Scotland Railway; Banff, Macduff and Turriff Junction Railway	Turriff; Line and station closed
