= Banff Bridge railway station =

Disused railway station in Banff, Aberdeenshire

Coordinates: 57.66263°N 2.50969°W

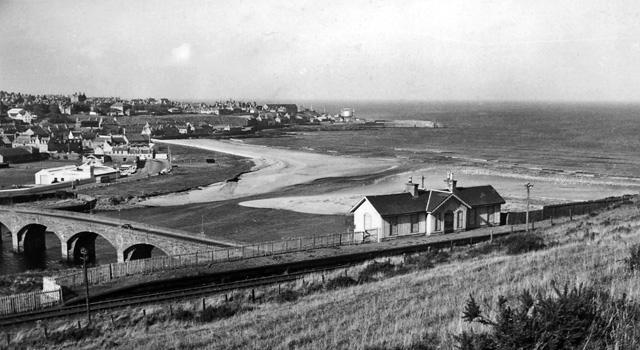
Banff Bridge railway station in 1961

Banff Bridge railway station was a railway station in Banff Bridge, Banff, Aberdeenshire. It was the penultimate stop on a branch line from Inveramsay to Macduff.

Another branch from Tillynaught railway station terminated at a separate station in Banff.

Passenger services were withdrawn after 30 September 1951.

| Preceding station | Disused railways | Following station |
|---|---|---|
| King Edward; Line and station closed | Great North of Scotland Railway; Banff, Macduff and Turriff Junction Railway | Macduff; Line and station closed |
