= Rothienorman railway station =

Former railway station in Scotland

Rothienorman
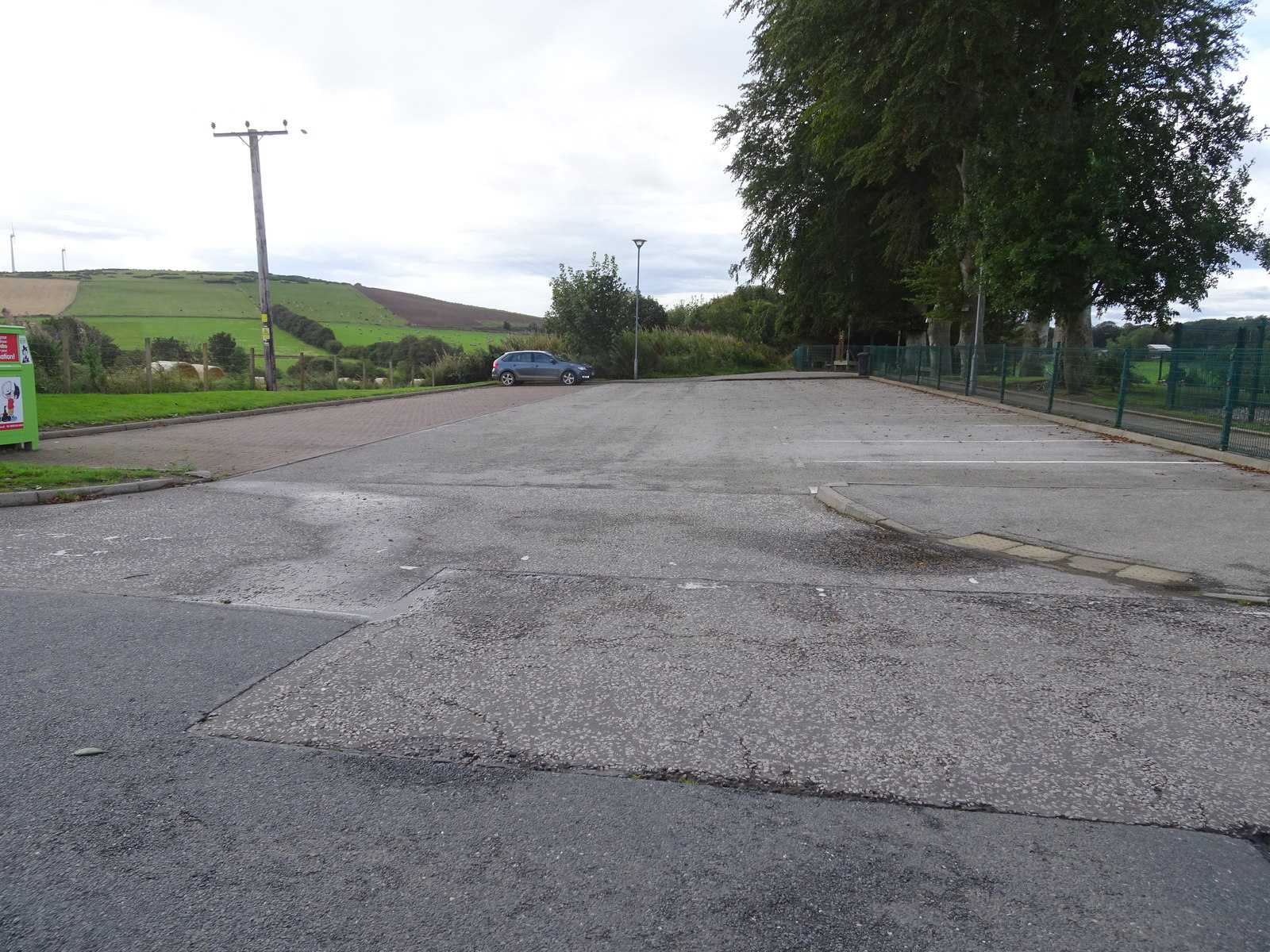
- Site of the old railway station

General information
- Location: Rothienorman, Aberdeenshire; Scotland
- Coordinates: 57.410°N 2.462°W
- Grid reference: NJ 723 356
- Platforms: 2

Other information
- Status: Disused

History
- Original company: Banff, Macduff and Turriff Junction Railway
- Pre-grouping: Great North of Scotland Railway

Key dates
- 5 September 1857: opened to passengers and goods
- 1 October 1951: closed to passengers
- 3 January 1966: Closed to goods
Location

Rothienorman railway station, Rothie or Rothie Norman was a railway station in Rothienorman, Aberdeenshire on the rural branchline to Macduff. It lay 7.25 miles (11.7 km) from the junction at Inveramsay at 392 feet (119 m) above sea level, the summit of the line. The station served the village and the nearby Rothie Norman House and estate.

== History and infrastructure ==
The station was known as 'Rothie' from 1857 to 1870 and 'Rothie Norman' from 1870 to 1951. The signal box was opened on 24 December 1894 and closed on 11 December 1961 but remained for a further year as a level crossing gate box. The station had two platforms connected by a pedestrian overbridge with a passing loop. A small wooden shelter stood on the up platform as did the signal box and the level crossing over a minor road to the south.

The main station buildings, typical of other stations on the line, stood on the down platform on the same side as the village. Several sidings and a goods shed stood to the south of the level crossing on the down side of the passing loop. Another siding lay to the north of the down platform end. The goods yard had a weighing machine and a crane with a 1 long ton 5 cwt (2,800 lb or 1.3 t) lift. Passenger services were withdrawn after 30 September 1951. The line closed to goods on 3 January 1966.

== Present condition ==
The station buildings and platform have been demolished and a primary school car park sits on the site.

== Previous services ==
All passenger trains stopped at the station.

Preceding station	Disused railways	Following station
Wartle; Line and Station closed	Great North of Scotland Railway; Banff, Macduff and Turriff Junction Railway	Fyvie; Line and Station closed
