= Auchterless =

Village in Aberdeenshire, Scotland

Coordinates: 57°27′39″N 2°29′3″W

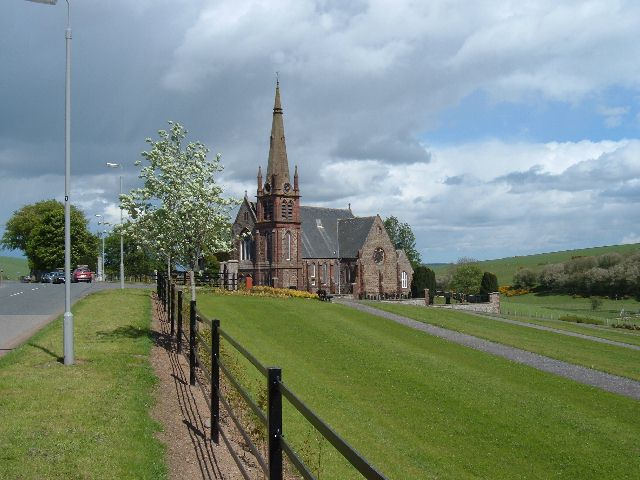
Auchterless Kirk

Auchterless (Scottish Gaelic: Uachdar Leasa, meaning the "Upper Part of Less") is a village in Aberdeenshire, Scotland; grid reference NJ 713 416, postcode AB53 8BG. The nearest large settlement is Turriff. It is traditionally known as "Kirkton of Auchterless".

== History ==
The history of Auchterless spans from prehistoric times through its development as a settled agricultural community in Aberdeenshire. Archaeological surveys confirm that the area has been inhabited for millennia, with prehistoric remains including stone circles and the remnants of earthen huts found within the vicinity.

The village is traditionally known as the "Kirkton of Auchterless", reflecting its historical importance as a parish centre. The site of the ruined St Drostan's Church (Old Parish Church) is a key historical landmark. Though in ruins, the church retains several significant features, including a distinct birdcage bellcote, a chamfered arch window, and a bell dated 1644.

The current place of worship, the Auchterless (New Parish) Church, was erected much later in 1879 by architects W & J Smith. To preserve its heritage, parts of the previous church building were incorporated into the new tower wall. A prominent structure associated with the parish is the Duff of Hamilton mausoleum, built in 1877. This mausoleum features pedimented gables and a detailed marble coat-of-arms.

The history of Auchterless is closely tied to the power struggles and estates of local families. Approximately two miles north-east of the village, the Towie-Barclay farm incorporates the remains of Tolly Castle, which was once a stronghold of the powerful Barclay family. While the castle was originally built in the 14th century, the majority of the surviving structure dates from the 16th century.

The development of Auchterless was significantly impacted by the expansion of the Scottish rail network in the mid-19th century. Auchterless station opened in 1857, serving the community as part of the Banff, Macduff and Turriff Junction Railway. This line later became integrated into the Great North of Scotland Railway, the LNER, and finally British Railways, connecting the settlement to the branch line running from Inveramsay to Macduff. The station eventually closed to passengers in 1951 and the line ceased operations for goods traffic in 1966. The main station building and the railway cottages remain today, having been converted into private housing.

== Notable people ==
The highly successful businessman Alexander Ellice, who made his fortune in the North American fur trade, was born here in 1743.

The author James Leslie Mitchell, who also wrote as Lewis Grassic Gibbon, was born in Auchterless in 1901.

== Bibliography ==
- McKean, Charles (1990), Banff & Buchan, Royal Incorporation of Architects in Scotland, ISBN 978-1-85158-231-0
