= Peter Garden (died 1775) =

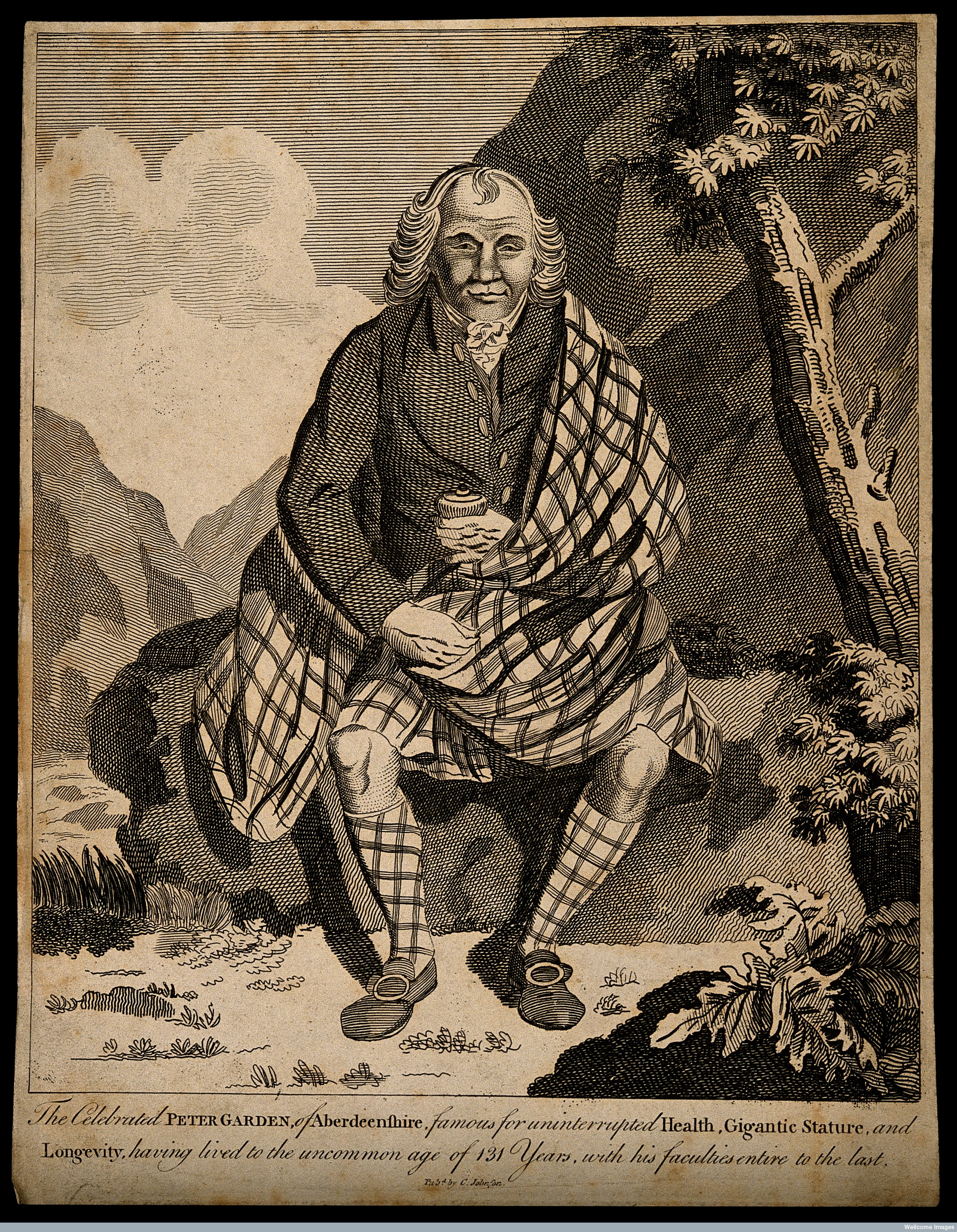
Portrait of Peter Garden from the Wellcome Collection

Peter Garden (reputedly c. 1644 – 12 January 1775) lived in the parish of Auchterless, Aberdeen Shire. At least two portraits of him exist. One is in the collection of the British Museum and another in the Wellcome Collection. Both portraits claim that he lived for 131 years. The Wellcome Collection portrait also says Garden was "famous for uninterrupted health, gigantic stature."
