= Banff, Aberdeenshire =

Town in Aberdeenshire, Scotland

Coordinates: 57.667°N 2.524°W

Banff: Scottish Gaelic: Banbh; Scots: Bamff
- Town
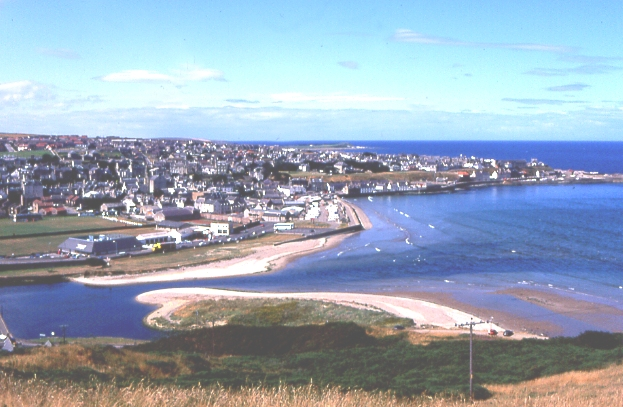
- Skyline of Banff Town

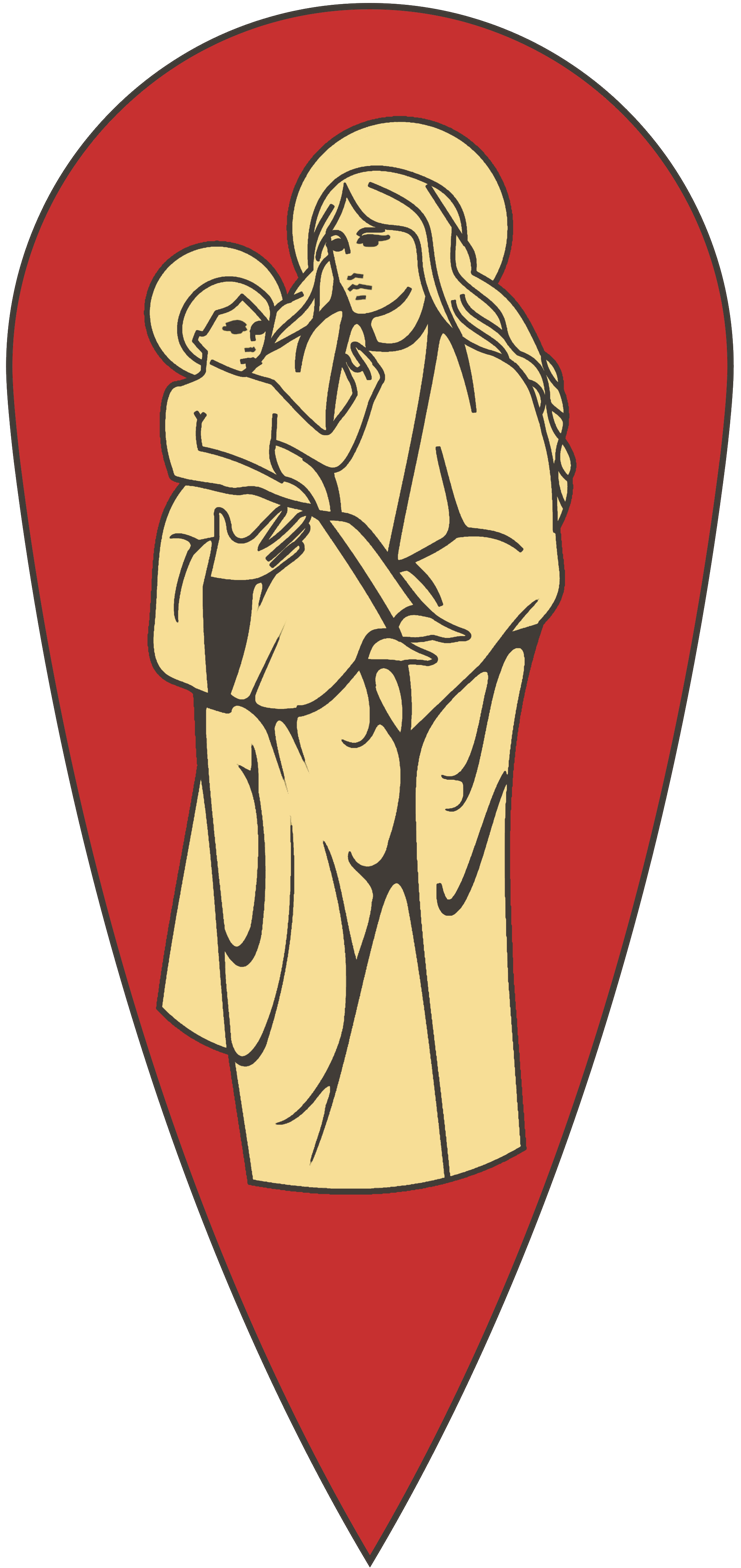
- Coat of Arms

- Location within Aberdeenshire
- Population: 3,968 (2022)
- OS grid reference: NJ688642
  - Edinburgh: 121 mi (195 km)
  - London: 436 mi (702 km)
- Council area: Aberdeenshire
- Lieutenancy area: Banffshire
- Country: Scotland
- Sovereign state: United Kingdom
- Post town: BANFF
- Postcode district: AB45
- Dialling code: 01261
- Police: Scotland
- Fire: Scottish
- Ambulance: Scottish
- UK Parliament: Aberdeenshire North and Moray East
- Scottish Parliament: Banffshire and Buchan Coast

Banff (Scottish Gaelic: Banbh) is a coastal town in the Banff and Buchan area of Aberdeenshire, Scotland. It is situated on Banff Bay and faces the town of Macduff across the estuary of the River Deveron. It is a former royal burgh, and is the county town of the historic county of Banffshire. It had a population of 3,968 in 2022.

== Etymology ==
The origin of the name is not certain. While it may be derived from the Scottish Gaelic banbh meaning 'piglet', a more likely origin is the name being a contraction of bean-naomh, Gaelic for 'holy woman', as this would tie in with the burgh's coat of arms which features the Virgin Mary. William J. Watson writes: "It is true that Banff is Banb in the Book of Deer and Banbh in modern Gaelic—one syllable. On the other hand, banbh, a suckling pig, is not appropriate—one might say it is impossible—as the name of a place or district."

== History ==
Banff's first castle was built to repel Viking invaders and a charter of 1163 AD shows that Malcolm IV was living there at that time. During this period the town was a busy trading centre in the "free hanse" of Northern Scottish burghs, despite not having its own harbour until 1775. The first recorded Sheriff of Banff was Richard de Strathewan in 1264, and in 1372 Royal Burgh status was conferred by King Robert II, who had a established a Carmelite priory near Banff in 1321. (The priory was destroyed by arson in 1559). By the 15th century Banff was one of three principal towns exporting salmon to the continent of Europe, along with Aberdeen and Montrose.

There was a great deal of lawlessness in 17th-century Scotland, and some of the worst offenders were members of the nobility. According to records kept by historian William Cramond, the tolbooth (courthouse and prison) of Banff was, in 1628, the site of an altercation between Lord Banff and James Ogilvie, his relative. Reportedly, he struck James Ogilvie upon the head with a baton during a court hearing. Twenty of his friends and followers then attacked Ogilvie with swords before chasing him into the street and finishing him off with a pistol shot.

Banff and Macduff are separated by the valley of the River Deveron. This unpredictable river was finally tamed by the seven arched bridge completed in 1779 by John Smeaton. An earlier bridge had been built in 1765, but was swept away in 1768. The old ferry was brought back into use, until it was lost in a flood in 1773.

A public meeting was held in 1800 and passed a resolution for the building of a turnpike road between Turriff and Banff as the existing road was in a sad state of repair. Later 19th century transport improvements included the building of two railway lines, from Macduff to Turiff in 1860 and the Banff, Portsoy and Strathisla Railway in 1859 which connected to the main Aberdeen to Inverness line.

During the 19th Century, the Banff Fishery District (comprising the ports from Crovie to Sandend) was important to the herring trade, with production peaking in 1853 at more than sixty-thousand barrels, of which nearly thirty-four thousand were exported; however, by 1912 production had declined to just over eight thousand barrels.

For over two hundred years from the mid 17th century, Banff was known for the high quality work produced by generations of silversmiths.

Reporting on Banff in 1912, the Annual Report of the Fishery Board states: "Practically no fishing carried on. Fishermen prosecuted their calling from the large centres. The number of steam drifters was increased by three. Boat-builders were moderately busy, and are likely to be so for some time.". In 1914, the trend continued: "No fishing carried on here. Fishermen prosecuted their calling from the large centres. The number of steam drifters was increased by 2. Boatbuilders were busy until the outbreak of war, when a number of orders for drifters were cancelled."

Fishery Statistics

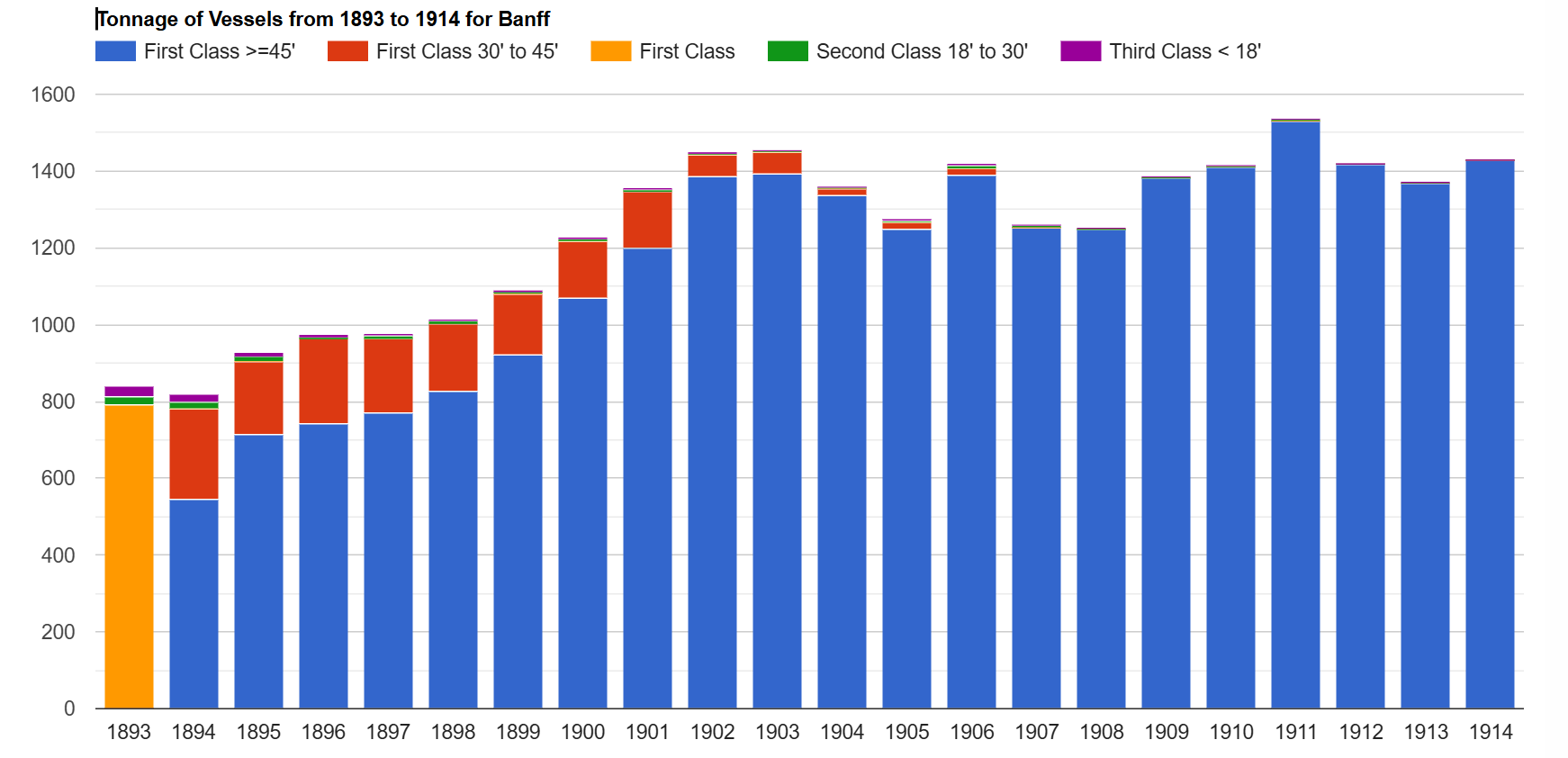
Tonnage of vessels

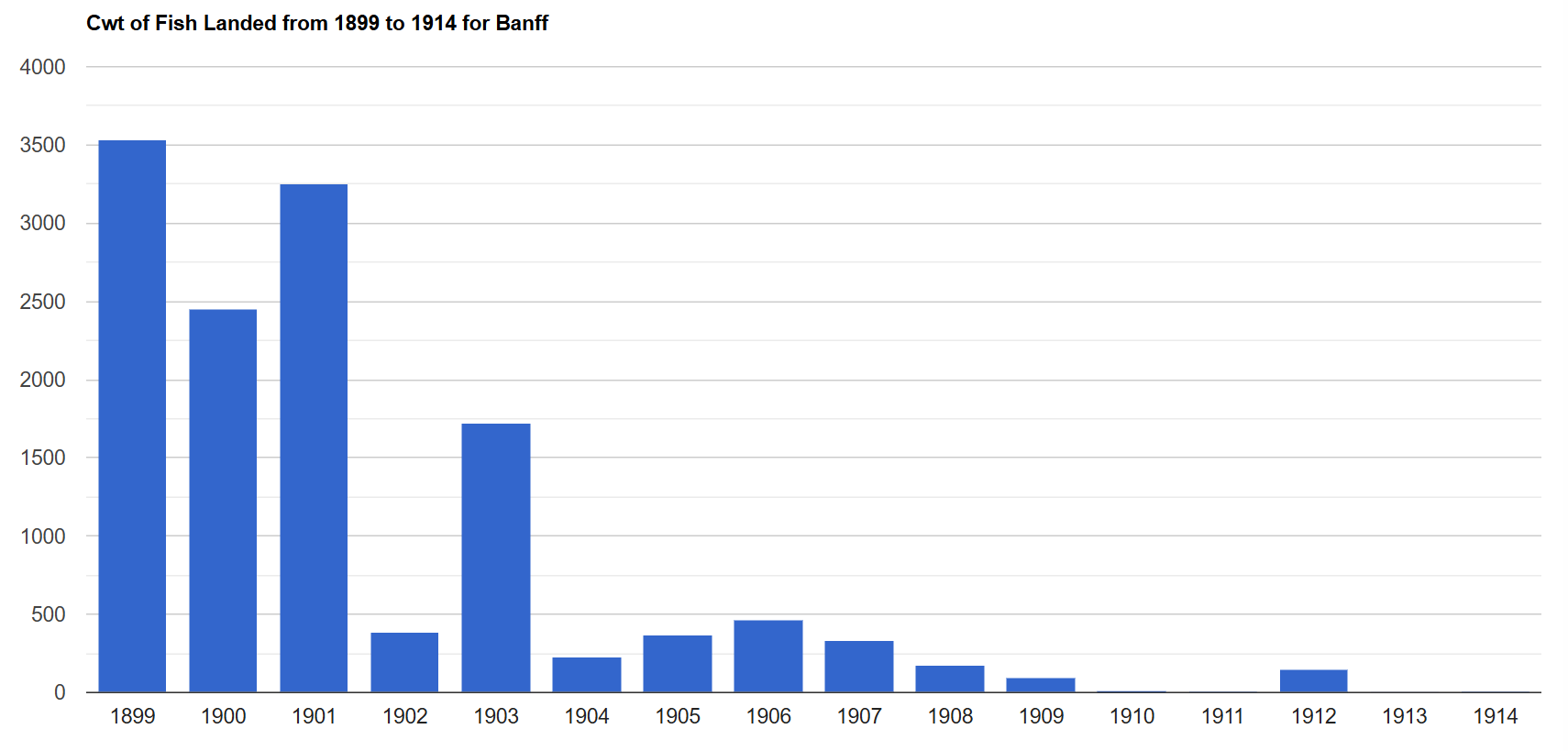
Cwt of fish landed

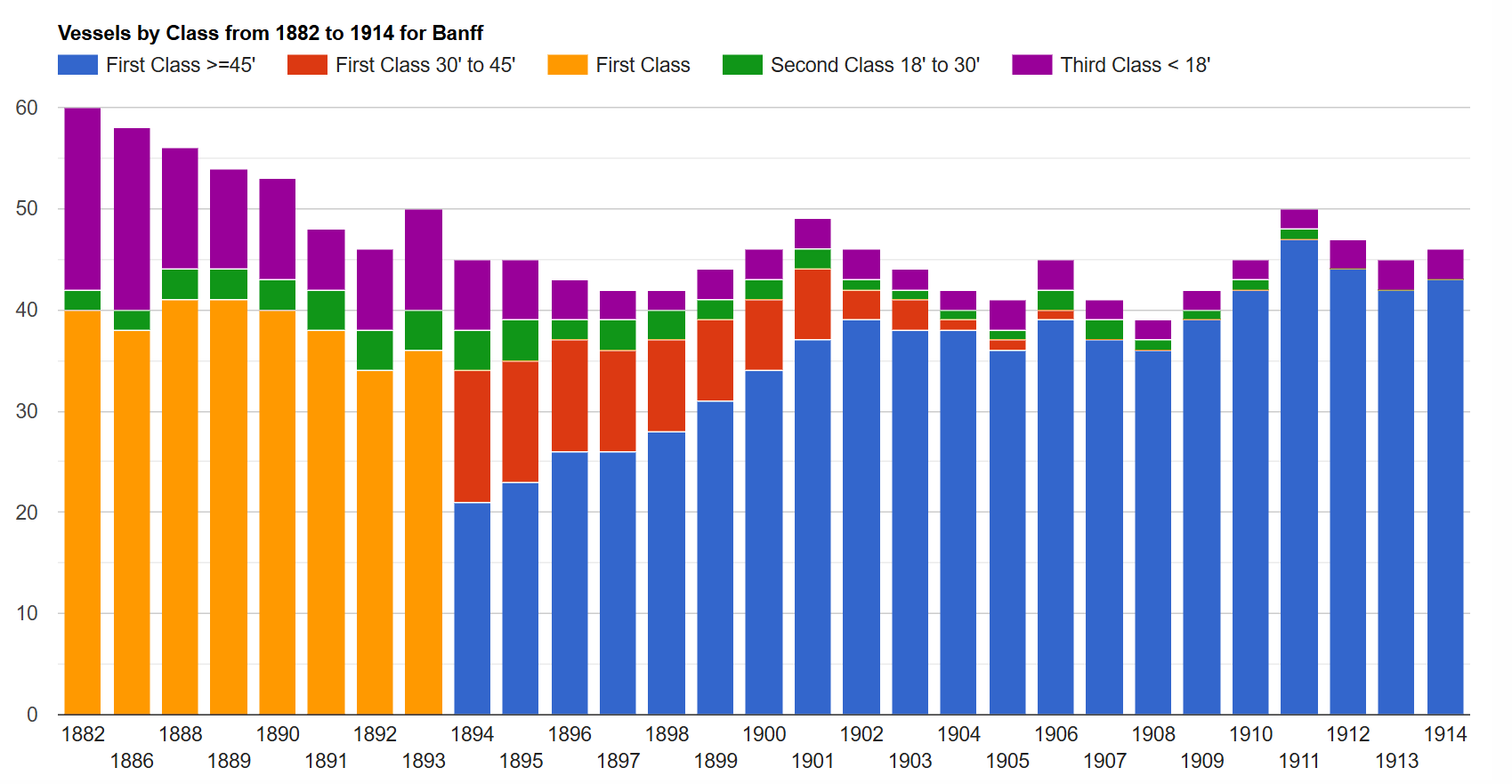
Vessels by class

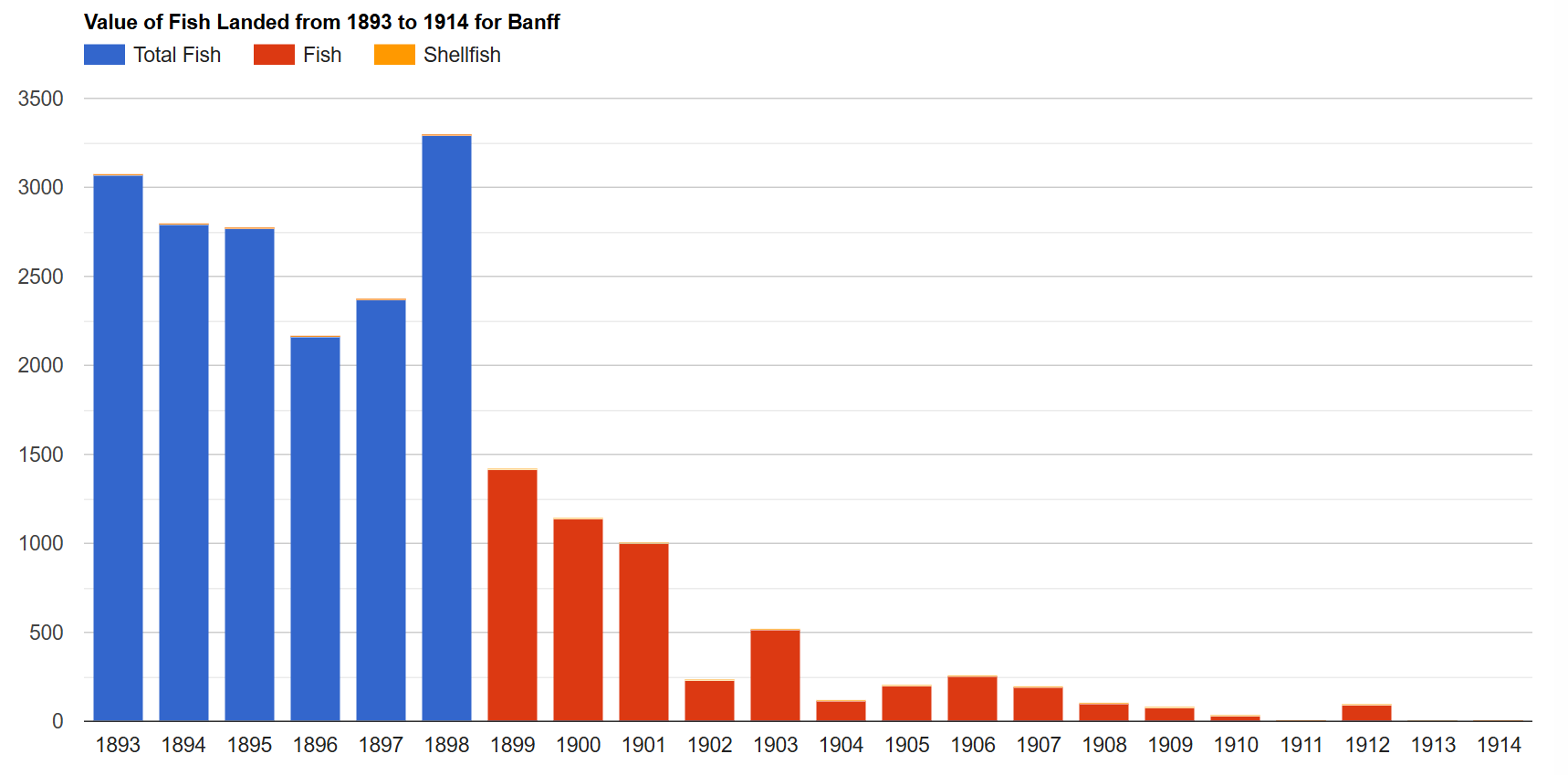
Value (£] of fish landed

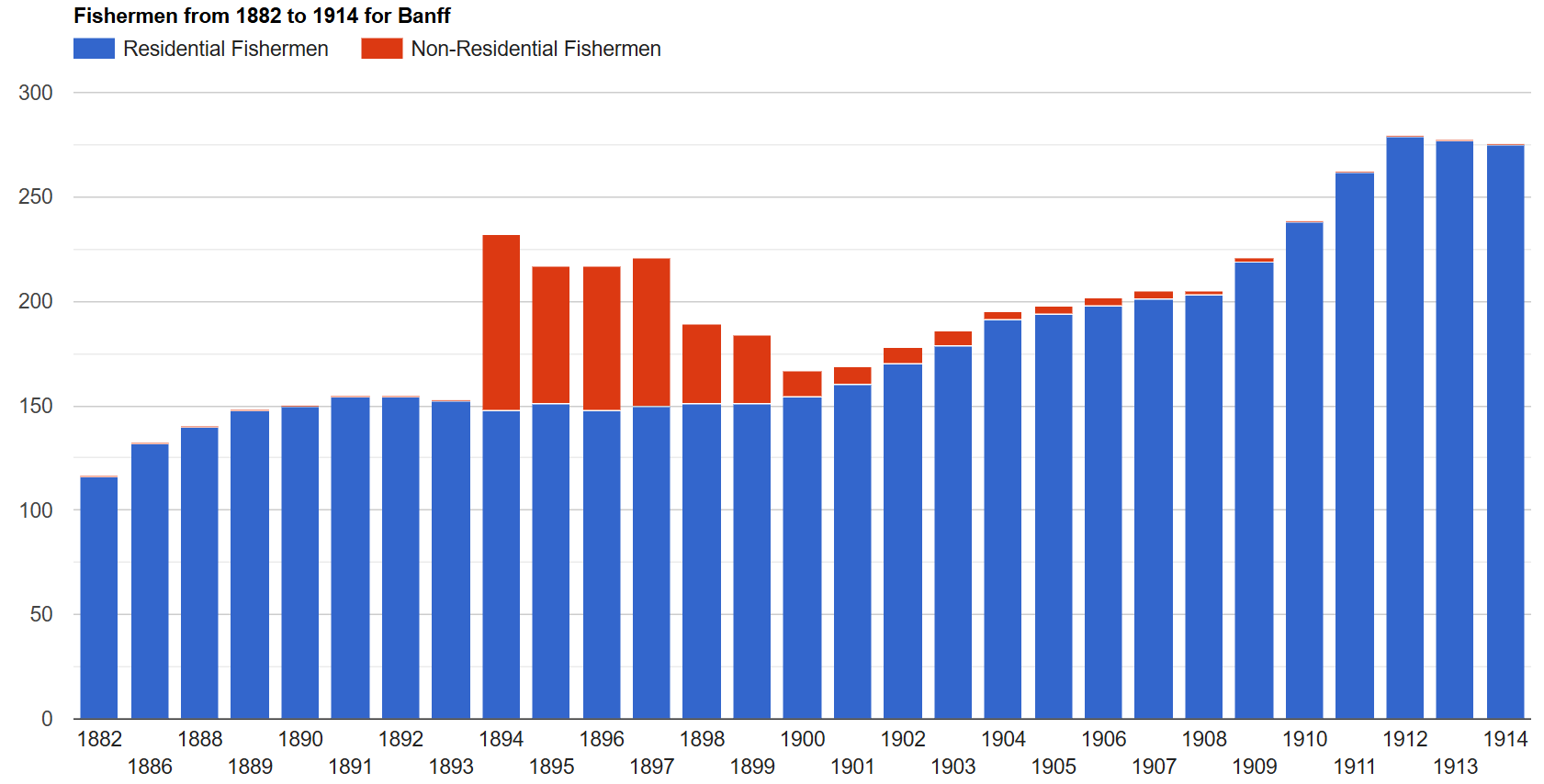
Fishermen

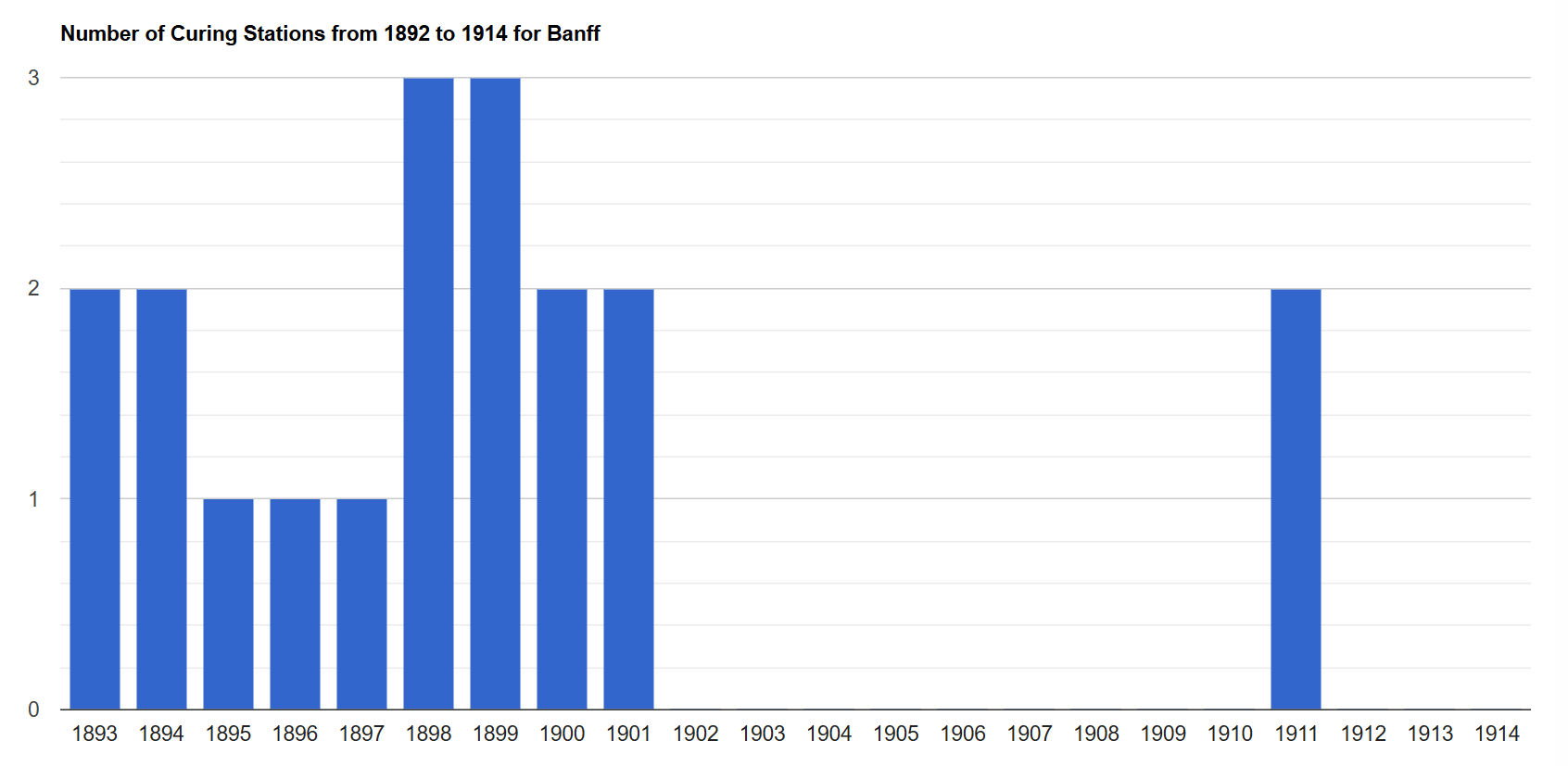
Number of curing stations

Currently, the languages spoken in the town and in its vicinity tend to be the Doric dialect of Scots, and English.

== Attractions and architecture ==
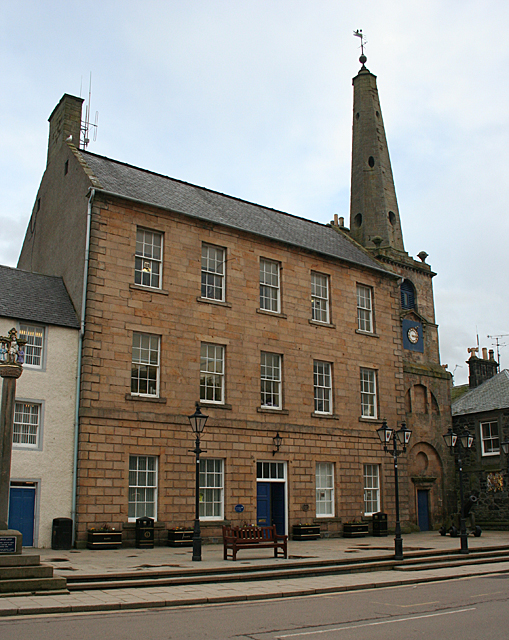
Banff Town House

The modern-day town has a golf course (Duff House Royal), beaches, and was home to the Colleonard Sculpture Park, which was relocated to Aviemore.

COAST Festival of the Visual Arts is an annual festival of weekend-long events and attractions in both Banff and Macduff. It runs over the bank holiday weekend at the end of May each year.

The townscape, which is one of the best-preserved in Scotland, has many historic buildings, including fragments of the former royal Banff Castle, a pre-Reformation market cross, a tolbooth, many vernacular townhouses, and a museum donated by Andrew Carnegie. (The market cross has been moved several times, before finding a permanent home on the plainstanes, the elevated stone pavement in front of Banff Town House on Low Street. The crucifix is upon a 1627 shaft.) Close by is Duff House, designed by William Adam in 1730, and one of Scotland's finest classical houses. It is open to the public as an out-station of the National Gallery of Scotland. Also open to the public are the Wrack Woods, due south of Duff House. The woods contain an old ice house, a mausoleum, and a walk to the secluded Bridge of Alvah, a single-arch bridge spanning the river Deveron. The Deveron is known for its salmon and trout fishing.

Low Street

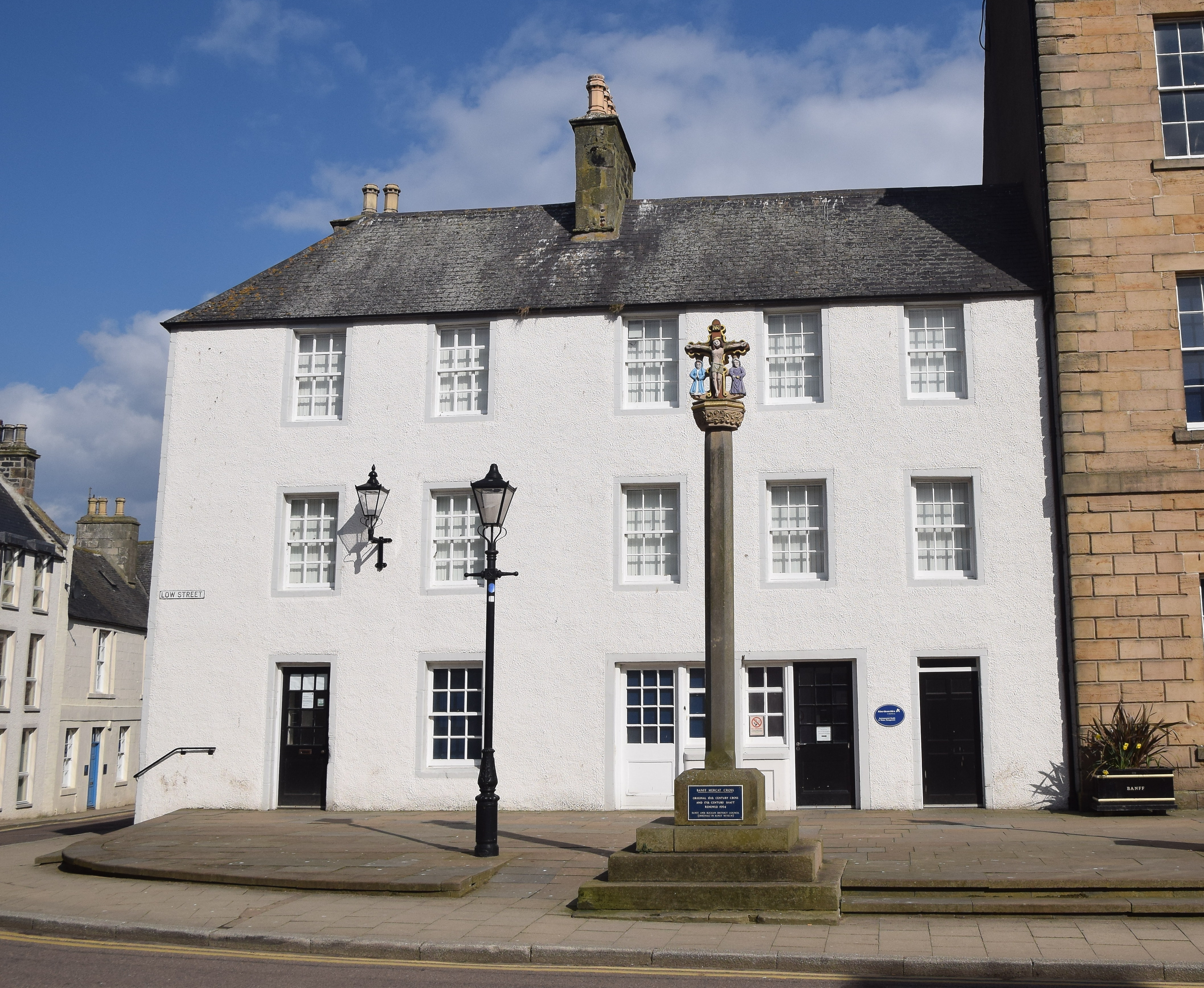
The market cross

The Town House was built in 1797, designed by James Reid and John Adam. The adjacent spire, named the Steeple, was built in 1764 as a freestanding structure, designed by Adam. The master mason was John Marr.

Wilson's (57–59 Low Street) dates to 1835. It is made of ashlar stone, heading the northern view up Low Street.

A classical triumphal archway leads to the New Market, erected by Provost George Robinson in 1831, celebrates the market's move into the centre from its previous shoreline location.

Tolbooth Hotel (53–55 Low Street) dates from 1801. After the construction of the Town House, the old tolbooth became redundant and was replaced by this hotel.

49–57 Low Street was a Clydesdale Bank in 1837, designed by William Robertson. As of 2020, it is still a Clydesdale Bank.

Carmelite House, at 28 Low Street, was built in 1753 for Admiral William Gordon.

Across the street, the Bank of Scotland building at 29 Low Street was built in 1891.

The Fife Arms Hotel once stood at numbers 8 to 18. Now flats, the hotel replaced the Black Bull Inn, to accommodate visitors to Duff House. The adjacent buildings to the south, numbers 2 and 4, date from the mid 18th century and are in the "older style", with crowstepped with skew putts and harled wings to the rear.

At 1 Low Street is the Court House and County Hall, built late in his life, between 1870 and 1871, by James Matthews. It was built on the former site of the home of Katharine Innes, Lady Gight, who was periodically visited by her grandson, George Gordon (later Lord Byron).

Bridge Street

An "excellent, long, narrow street penetrating the heart of the town as the principal entrance from the east," Bridge Street is a collection of 18th-century buildings, many on the north side dating to 1770. McKean also asks visitors to note the Victorian cast-iron columned shop at number 46, the cast-iron pillared shop at number 38, the pilasters and elaborate capitals, c. 1835, on numbers 43–53, the crowsteps on number 23, and the "genteel elegance of number 6", which has a rusticated ground floor and architraved doorway.

Many of the nearby villages also contribute to tourism in the area; in particular Gardenstown and Pennan. Banff's Tourist Information Centre opens during the summer and can be found by St Mary's car park adjacent to Banff Parish Church on Banff's High Street. Their audio tours provide an insight into the town, its history and architecture.

Though no longer a commercial port, the harbour has been subject to redevelopment during the latter half of 2006 and now has a marina which serves leisure traffic and small fishing boats. The newly constructed marina was only accessible +3hrs mlw due to heavy and rapid siltation. By 2012 the silting problem had been resolved and the entrance is kept dredged to Chart Datum which makes it accessible over longer periods of the tide, especially to boats of a metre or less draft.

Institution Terrace

The Old Academy (originally called Wilson's Academy, later Banff Academy) was built in 1837 by William Robertson, financed by money left by James Wilson (d. 1799). It combined the school with the Museum of the Banff Institution for Science, Literature & the Arts, founded in 1828. The Academy is fronted by a wide pedimented portico of six Ionic columns and two shallow end pavilions "with even shallower twinned Corinthian pilasters". The Museum passed into Town control in 1875, and replaced the ancient Turrets building in High Street in 1902.

Back Path

"A beautifully scaled street focused upon the Doric portico of the former Fife Arms Hotel at the bottom," writes Charles McKean. Houses feature crowsteps, but the only individually distinctive one, McKean notes, is number 8—a harled, crowstepped house with the inscribed panel: George Malsie ... Elspet Morison ... 1739 ... God's Providence is our Inheritance.

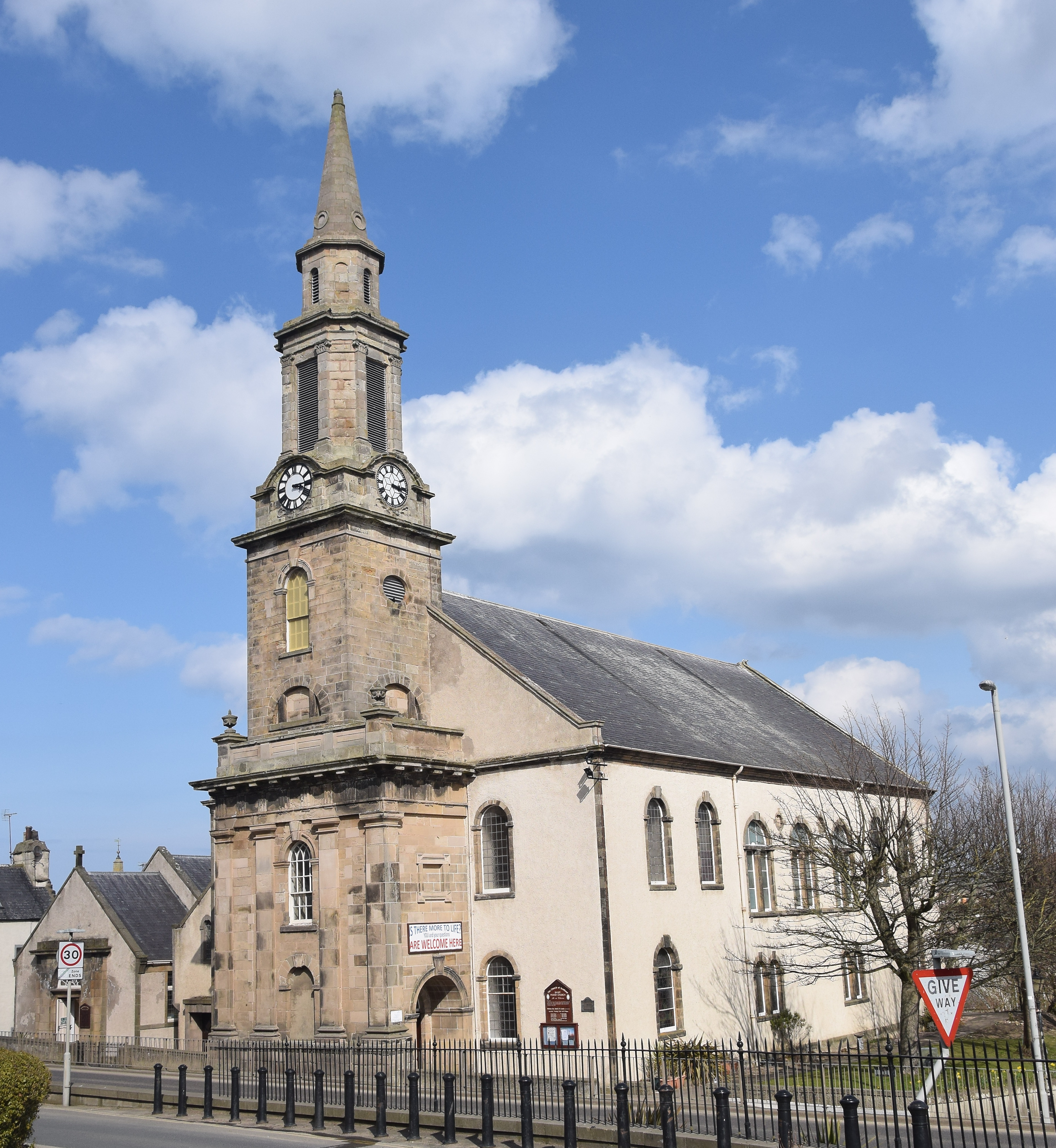
Banff Parish Church, pictured in 2018

Airlie Gardens

Airlie Gardens, still present, formerly stood to the east of Airlie House, built by the Lords Banff in the late 17th century. Airlie House was displaced by Duff House, before being demolished. Today the gardens are also known as Duff House Gardens.

High Street

Banff Parish Church, the parish kirk, was built in 1778 by Andrew Wilson. Its tower and spire were added by Thomas Mackenzie in 1842 to an earlier design by William Robertson. Its chancels and apse were added in 1925.

St Andrew's Church was built in 1833 by Archibald Simpson, while its rectory was built twenty years later by A & W Reid.

St Brandon's, a town house of Sir George Abercromby of Glassaugh, built around 1760. It was built on the site of an earlier townhouse of the Bairds of Auchmedden. It was added to an earlier, late 17th-century harled two-and-a-half-storey block. It was extended further in 1867.

County Hotel, at 32 High Street, was built in 1770 for George Robinson.

Numbers 1–5 High Street—"three substantial houses"—were built between 1760 and 1764. The largest of the three, to the north, was the town house of Lord Banff. They are differentiated by their doorways. Numbers 31–39 pre-date these by a couple of decades. They were reconstructed as four houses with freestone window margins in 1988.

At 43–47 High Street is Shoemakers' Land, built in 1710 as a Trades Halls for local Leather and Shoe Makers Incorporation which is detailed in the Shoe makers crest above the arched entrance . It was converted into dwellings in 1787 retaining the "trade halls" on the ground floor in the form of retail outlets. It was renovated in 1975, as two flats within (No. 43) and one house (No. 45) again retaining the retail properties as separate units below. This was the first work undertaken for the Banff Preservation Trust, which was formed due to the demolition of the property to the right, originally a fruit and vegetable shop where the produce was grown on the land at the rear on the building. It was demolished to make way for what in now Morrisons.

Forbes House, a tall town house at 77–81 High Street, was built in 1741 for the Forbes of Boyndie.

Boyndie Street

Boyndie Street was the ancient route west to Cullen. Numbers 5–7 date to the 18th century, while, next door at number 9, Boyndie House was built in 1740, its "delicately shaped Dutch-gable to the street. A carved armorial panel is inscribed with IGMS 1740.

The Town & County Club town house, built in 1772, stands at number 11. It is one of the largest provincial town houses in mid-18th-century Scotland. It was built for the George Robinson, and was converted into the club in 1881. Robinson and his son were Provosts of Banff between 1784 and 1831, with only two short interruptions.

== Climate ==
Banff has an oceanic climate, with mild temperatures year round.

Climate data for Banff (27m asl, averages 1991–2020)
Month	Jan	Feb	Mar	Apr	May	Jun	Jul	Aug	Sep	Oct	Nov	Dec	Year
Mean daily maximum °C (°F)	6.8 (44.2)	7.1 (44.8)	8.9 (48.0)	11.1 (52.0)	13.8 (56.8)	15.9 (60.6)	17.9 (64.2)	18.0 (64.4)	16.0 (60.8)	12.5 (54.5)	9.3 (48.7)	6.9 (44.4)	12.0 (53.6)
Mean daily minimum °C (°F)	2.1 (35.8)	2.1 (35.8)	3.0 (37.4)	4.7 (40.5)	6.6 (43.9)	9.7 (49.5)	11.6 (52.9)	11.7 (53.1)	10.0 (50.0)	7.2 (45.0)	4.4 (39.9)	2.2 (36.0)	6.3 (43.3)
Average rainfall mm (inches)	54.4 (2.14)	46.5 (1.83)	45.9 (1.81)	50.3 (1.98)	49.6 (1.95)	56.4 (2.22)	66.6 (2.62)	64.1 (2.52)	63.0 (2.48)	77.4 (3.05)	72.5 (2.85)	65.1 (2.56)	711.8 (28.01)
Average rainy days (≥ 1 mm)	13.5	11.3	12.8	11.2	9.9	9.2	10.2	10.4	13.2	12.2	14.8	13.1	141.8
Mean monthly sunshine hours	43.3	67.2	108.0	145.3	198.4	150.5	147.4	149.7	112.1	85.6	52.8	28.7	1,289
Source: Met Office (rain days 1981–2010)

== Railways ==
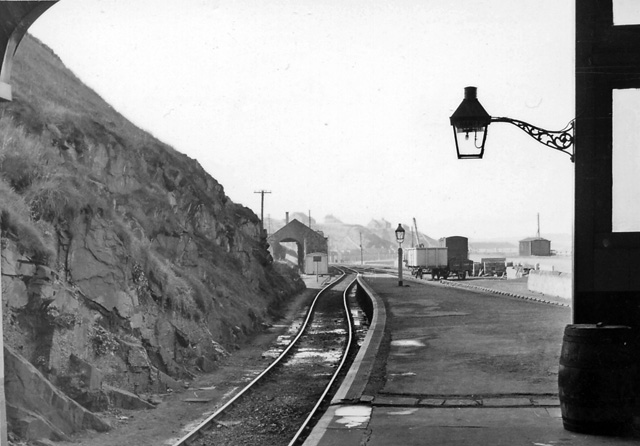
Banff railway station (the GNoS line) in 1961

Banff was served by the Banff, Portsoy and Strathisla Railway (BPSR) from 1857 (to Banff Harbour station), and the Banff, Macduff and Turriff Junction Railway belonging to the Great North of Scotland Railway (GNSR) from 1860. The latter went to Banff & Macduff station, almost 1 mile (1.5 kilometres) from Banff. The GNSR later took over operation and then ownership of the older BPSR line.

In 1872 the line to Banff & Macduff station benefitted from replacement stations closer to the town centre of Macduff; Banff Bridge opened near the bridge between Banff and Macduff, on the Macduff side of the river, with its line then continuing into Macduff railway station. The original Banff & Macduff station closed on 1 July 1872.

All the lines suffered from mid-20th century railway cuts, with Banff Bridge station closing by the end of 1951, and Banff Harbour (known simply as Banff from 1928) closing on 6 July 1964. The nearest open stations are Huntly and Keith, both around twenty miles (thirty kilometres) away.

== Sport ==
Banff and surrounding areas have a local Highland League football team, Deveronvale F.C., Junior football club, Deveronside F.C., and a rugby team, Banff RFC.

Duff House Royal Golf Club course is bordered by the River Deveron and Duff House.

The town has sports pitches at Canal Park. There are plans to sell the land for construction of a Morrisons supermarket, despite most participants in public consultations opposing the sale.

== Notable residents ==
- Thomas Ruddiman (1674–1757), classical scholar, printer and publisher
- Walter Ruddiman (1719–1781), printer, publisher and newspaper proprietor
- George Duff (1764–1805), British naval officer
- James Milne Wilson (1812–1880), Premier of Tasmania 1869–1872
- Thomas Edward (1814–1886), naturalist
- William Brodie (1815–1881), sculptor
- Margaret Catherine Blaikie (1823–1915), Scottish temperance reformer
- William Bankier (1870–1949), bodybuilder and strongman
- Richard Gordon (1947–2009), author
- Steven Watt (born 1984), footballer
- Sandi Thom (born 1981), singer-songwriter, born in Banff
- James McManus (born 1986), rugby league player for the Newcastle Knights in Australia's National Rugby League
- Bruce Anderson (born 1998), footballer
