= Rothienorman =

Coordinates: 57.412386°N 2.465594°W

Rothienorman: Scottish Gaelic: Ràth Thormoid
- Location within Aberdeenshire
- Population: 1,080 (2020)
- OS grid reference: NJ721358
- Council area: Aberdeenshire
- Lieutenancy area: Aberdeenshire
- Country: Scotland
- Sovereign state: United Kingdom
- Post town: INVERURIE
- Postcode district: AB51
- Dialling code: 01651
- Police: Scotland
- Fire: Scottish
- Ambulance: Scottish
- UK Parliament: Gordon and Buchan
- Scottish Parliament: Aberdeenshire East

Rothienorman is a village in Aberdeenshire in north east Scotland. In 2025 it was classified as a town by the Understanding Scottish Places project, based on population growth.

The local economy has traditionally been based on farming.

== History ==
=== Rothienorman House ===
Rothienorman Castle became Rothienorman House and then Rothie House. It was subjected to major rebuilding c. 1800 and was baronialised in 1862 (architect James Matthews). By c.1912 it was owned by Reginald Crawford-Leslie, whose family home it remained until just after the Second World War. It belonged to the Crawford family and Henry Nigel Crawford was the last laird of Rothienorman, succeeding his brother Jock who was killed in action. The estate consisted of 2,700 acres (11 km^{2}), including the village of Rothienorman. The Leslie family purchased Rothienorman in 1723.

The family name later changed from Leslie to Crawford-Leslie and was subsequently shortened to Crawford. The Crawfords sold Rothie in 1951 due to death duties incurred during the war. The estate was broken up and the house was stripped by land agents. The house was still occupied in 1945, but the roof was later removed. The house is now overgrown with ivy and is in a bad state of repair.

== Railway ==
Rothienorman was a station on the Banff, Macduff and Turriff Junction Railway. It opened in 1857, was renamed from Rothie in 1870, closed to passengers in 1951, and the line closed completely in 1966.

== Fraser Trailers ==
The village was home to Fraser Brothers (Transport) Rothienorman Limited, recorded in 1976, and later to Fraser Agricultural (Rothienorman) Limited, incorporated in 1975, which manufactured agricultural and forestry machinery. In 1999 the company was renamed Fraser Manufacturing Limited.

== Twenty-first century developments ==
In the early 21st century the village experienced residential expansion, including new housing developments. Community facilities include a primary school, bowling club and community centre.

Rothie Rovers play at Forgue Road in the village and joined the North Region Junior Football Association in 2020.

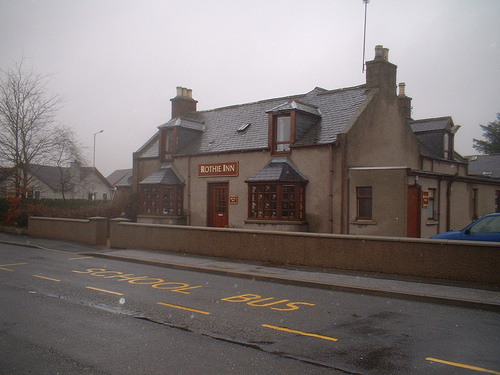
The Rothie Inn, Rothienorman
