= Macduff (Banff) railway station =

Disused railway station in Macduff, Aberdeenshire

Coordinates: 57.6594°N 2.5061°W

Macduff (Banff)

General information
- Location: Macduff, Aberdeenshire; Scotland
- Platforms: 1

Other information
- Status: Disused

History
- Original company: Great North of Scotland Railway
- Pre-grouping: Great North of Scotland Railway

Key dates
- 4 June 1860: Opened as Banff and Macduff
- 1866: Name changed to Macduff (Banff)
- 1 July 1872: Closed

Macduff (Banff) railway station served the town of Macduff, Aberdeenshire, Scotland, from 1860 to 1872 on the Banff, Macduff and Turriff Junction Railway.

== History ==
The station opened as Banff and Macduff on 4 June 1860 by the Great North of Scotland Railway. To the south was the goods yard and to the north was a locomotive shed. The station's name was changed to Macduff (Banff) in 1866. The location wasn't ideal because it was situated a mile away from Macduff so it closed on 1 July 1872.

Preceding station	Disused railways	Following station
King Edward; Line and station closed	Great North of Scotland Railway; Banff, Macduff and Turriff Extension Railway	Terminus
