= Macduff railway station =

Former railway station in Scotland

Coordinates: 57.6672°N 2.5041°W

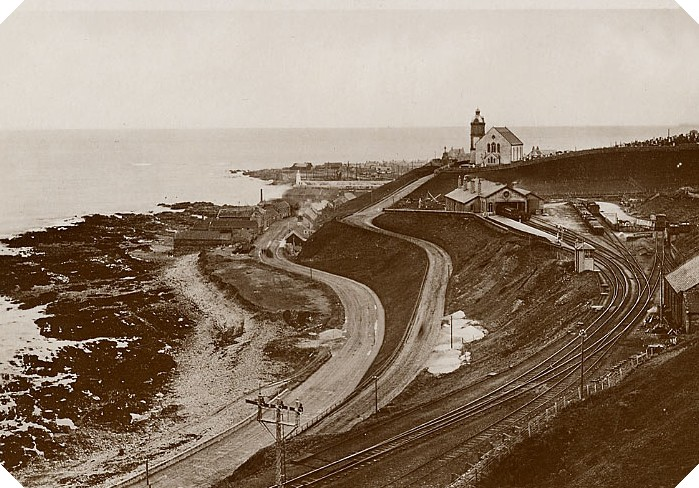
Macduff Railway station photographed prior to WW2.

Macduff railway station was a railway station serving the settlements of Banff and Macduff, Aberdeenshire, Scotland. It was the terminus of a branch line from Inveramsay. It was opened in 1872 by Banff, Macduff and Turriff Junction Railway which was later absorbed by the Great North of Scotland Railway.

Prior to the station being built, Macduff was served by Banff & Macduff station, almost a mile from the town.

The preceding station on the line into Macduff was Banff Bridge, on the Macduff side of the bridge leading to neighbouring Banff. Banff itself had Banff Harbour station on a different line.

Macduff station was closed for passenger traffic from 1 October 1951 and completely in 1961 when freight traffic ceased from 1 August.

Preceding station	Disused railways	Following station
Banff Bridge; Line and station closed	Great North of Scotland Railway	Terminus
