= Inveramsay railway station =

Former railway station in Scotland

Inveramsay
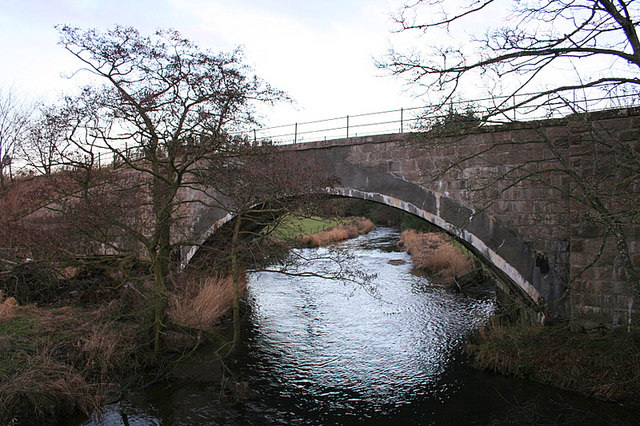
- Railway bridge near Milton of Inveramsay

General information
- Location: Inveramsay, Aberdeenshire; Scotland
- Coordinates: 57.3174°N 2.4388°W
- Grid reference: NJ736252
- Platforms: 3

Other information
- Status: Disused

History
- Original company: Banff, Macduff and Turriff Junction Railway
- Pre-grouping: Great North of Scotland Railway
- Post-grouping: London and North Eastern Railway

Key dates
- 5 September 1857: Station opened
- 1 October 1951: Station closed to passengers
- 1966: Branch line closed entirely
Location

Inveramsay railway station was a railway station in the parish of Chapel of Garioch, near the Mill of Inveramsay, Aberdeenshire. It served the sparsely populated rural area, but was mainly an interchange for the Macduff and Banff branch lines.

== History ==
Inveramsay was opened in 1857 by the Banff, Macduff and Turriff Junction Railway, then part of the Great North of Scotland Railway it became part of the London and North Eastern Railway during the Grouping of 1923, passing on to the Scottish Region of British Railways during the nationalisation of 1948. It was then closed by British Railways in October 1951 on the same date as the branch despite the main line north remaining open. Although a junction it was never officially referred to as such on the name boards.

== Infrastructure ==
The station was the junction for the branch to Macduff and Banff, standing at 237 feet (72 m) above sea level. It had two platforms on the main line, with one serving as an island with the main station building and one of its two platform being used for the branch with a passing loop present. A footbridge was present. Sidings stood to the East and a turntable was provided. Inveramsay to Kintore was doubled in 1882 and the north and south signal boxes were open in the same year.

The north signal box worked the branch line, controlling the passing loop's north end, and access to a loading bank, with the south box, standing on the west side of the tracks, controlling the lines to the engine shed and sidings from the south.

In 1930 a ground frame replaced the north signal box. By 1888 the Insch to Inveramsay section of the Inverness line had been doubled however in 1969 the Insch to Inverurie section was singled.

Several railway cottages stood to the south-west in 1901.

The exchange sidings on the branch side were latterly used to hold wagons destined for the nearby Inverurie works.

== Remains ==
A station building survives on the old island platform and the second platform to the west remains with the single track line now realigned between the two. The single track line to Inverness runs through the site.

== Services ==
From 1926 Sunday excursion trains from Aberdeen were advertised and from 1938 they appeared in the timetables. In 1932 passenger trains stopped at all the stations with five a day in each direction. Although regular passengers services ceased in 1951 a SLS/RCTS Joint Scottish Tour visited Turriff on 13 June 1960 and another excursion ran in 1965. In WWII fuel oil was transported to Turriff and was then piped to Ministry of Defence storage tanks which supplied local airfields. By 1948 four return trips a day were made as the coal supply situation had improved. Another severe coal shortage occurred in 1951 and the passenger service ceased despite protests, with services withdrawn after 30 September 1951.

| Preceding station | Historical railways | Following station |
|---|---|---|
| Inverurie; Line and Station open | Great North of Scotland Railway; GNoSR Main Line | Pitcaple; Line open; Station closed |
| | Disused railways | |
| Terminus | Great North of Scotland Railway; Banff, Macduff and Turriff Junction Railway | Wartle; Line and Station closed |
