= Balquhain =

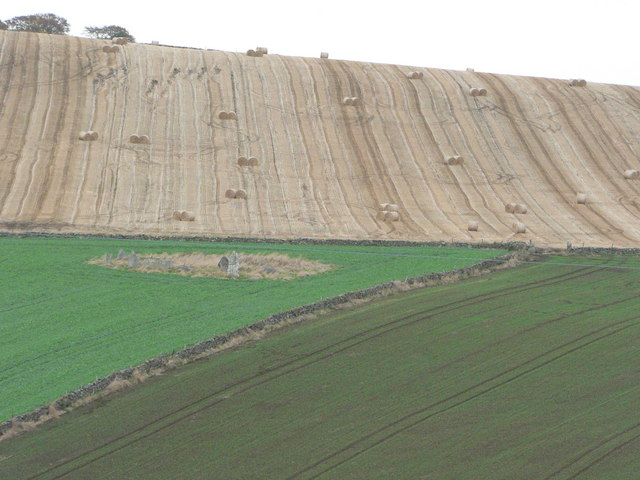
- The circle in fields
- Interactive map of Balquhain
- 57.3066°N 2.4415°W
- Location: Aberdeenshire, Scotland

Site notes
- Architectural style: British pre-Roman Architecture

Scheduled monument
- Official name: Mains of Balquhain stone circle
- Type: Prehistoric ritual and funerary: stone circle or ring
- Designated: 4 March 1977
- Reference no.: SM3961

Balquhain is a ruined recumbent stone circle 3 miles (4.8 km) from Inverurie in Scotland, with views to Mither Tap. Over seventy of these circles are found in lowland Aberdeenshire. Balquhain stands in farmland and has a recumbent weighing over 10 tonnes. It has been visited by Richard Bradley, Alexander Thom and Fred Coles. It is a scheduled monument.

== Recumbent stone circles ==
A recumbent stone circle is a type of stone circle constructed in the early Bronze Age. The identifying feature is that the largest stone (the recumbent) is always laid horizontally, with its long axis generally aligned with the perimeter of the ring between the south and southwest. A flanker stone stands each side of the recumbent and these are typically the tallest stones in the circle, with the smallest being situated on the northeastern aspect. The rest of the circle is usually composed of between six and ten orthostats graded by size. The builders tended to select a site which was on a level spur of a hill with excellent views to other landmarks. Over seventy of these circles are found in lowland Aberdeenshire in northeast Scotland – the most similar monuments are the axial stone circles of southwest Ireland. Recumbent stone circles generally enclosed a low ring cairn, though over the millennia these have often disappeared. They may have been a development from the Clava cairns found nearby in Inverness-shire and axial stone circles may have followed the design. Whilst cremated remains have been found at some sites, the precise function of these circles is not known.

== Description and measurements ==
Balquhain stone circle is located 3 miles (4.8 km) from Inverurie. It stands in farmland at an altitude of c. 100 metres (330 ft) on a terraced hillside leading up to a prominent summit called Mither Tap. The circle originally consisted of 12 stones. Four remain standing, with another four fallen, the final four presumed to have been moved.

The recumbent stone is 3.8 metres (12 ft) wide, 1.7 metres (5.6 ft) high and 1.05 metres (3.4 ft) deep, it has been estimated to weigh over ten tonnes. It is made of a type of white grained granite that has been suggested to have been brought some distance to the location. The eastern flanker stone is 2 metres (6.6 ft) wide and made of dark grey basalt with a round top. The western flanker stone is 2.25 metres (7.4 ft) wide and made of reddish quartzite bearing inclusions of white quartz and having a pointed top. The stone east of the east flanker is made of red granite. There is also an outlying stone 6 metres (20 ft) to the southeast of the circle that is 3.1 metres (10 ft) high and made of white quartz with roseate seams.

The circle has been estimated to have been between 18.3 metres (60 ft) to 21.3 metres (70 ft) in diameter. Alexander Thom suggested the circle had been 20.7 metres (68 ft) and Fred Coles of only 19.5 metres (64 ft). The recumbent has cup marks, a form of rock art; commentators such as Aubrey Burl and Julian Cope have drawn attention to how the stone aligns with hills in the landscape. It is a scheduled monument.
