= Banff, Macduff and Turriff Junction Railway =

Former railway line in Scotland

Banff, Macduff and Turriff Junction

Overview
- Locale: Scotland

History
- Opened: 1857
- Closed: 1966

Technical
- Track gauge: 4 ft 8 1/2 in (1,435 mm)

The Banff, Macduff and Turriff Junction Railway was a railway company that connected the Aberdeenshire town of Turriff with the main line of the Great North of Scotland Railway (GNoSR) at Inveramsay. It had earlier been intended to reach Macduff, but shortage of finance forced curtailment. It opened its line in 1857.

A separate company, the Banff, Macduff and Turriff Extension Railway, was formed to build an extension to Macduff. There was a road bridge connecting Macduff with Banff, crossing the River Deveron, and it was intended that both towns would be served by the railway’s terminus. The Extension Railway opened in 1860, but its terminus was some distance short of Macduff and of the bridge to Banff.

Both railways were absorbed by the Great North of Scotland Railway in 1866, and the line was extended by the GNoSR to a new Macduff station in 1872, with an intermediate station at the river bridge. The companies and the branch line were never commercially successful. In 1951 the line was closed to passengers; part of the line as far as Turriff remained active for goods traffic until 1966. The line is now completely inactive.

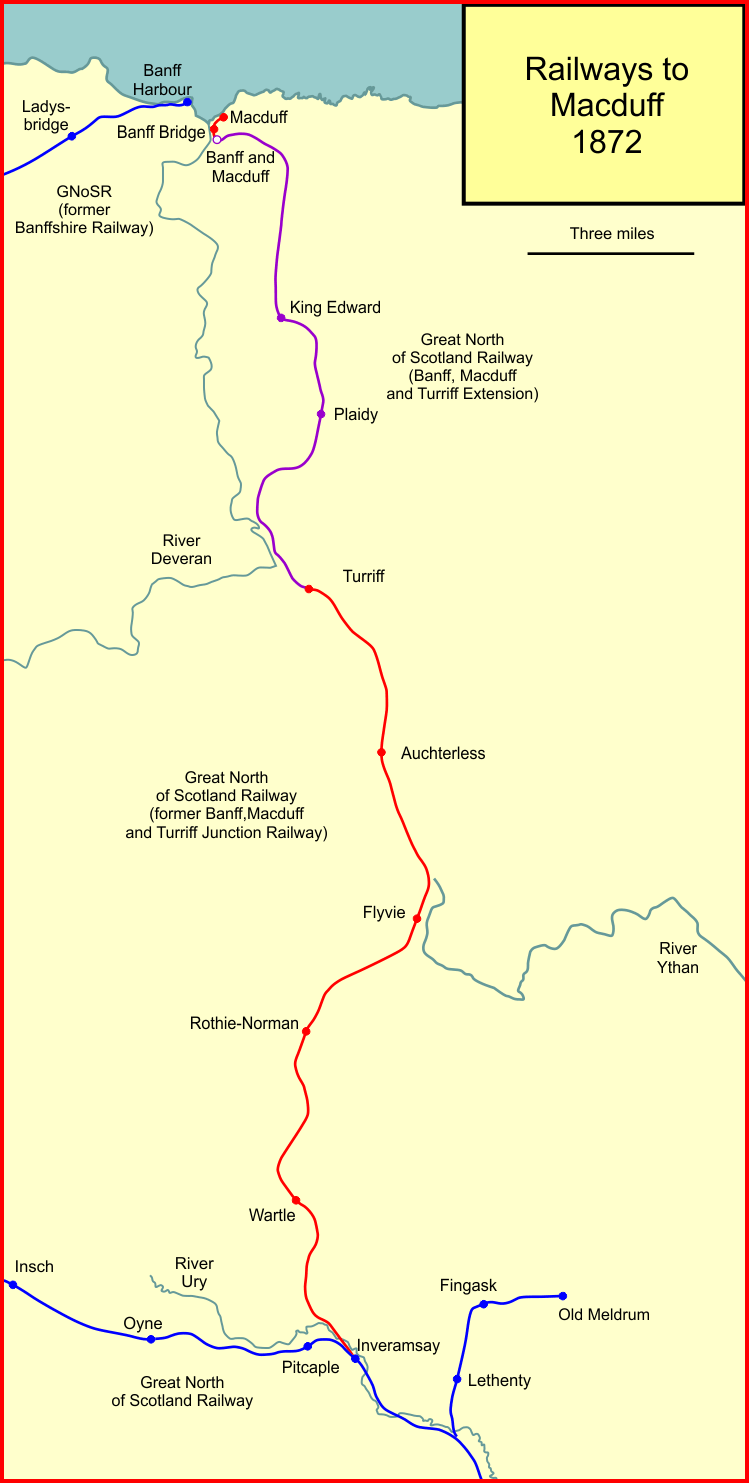
System map of the railways to Macduff

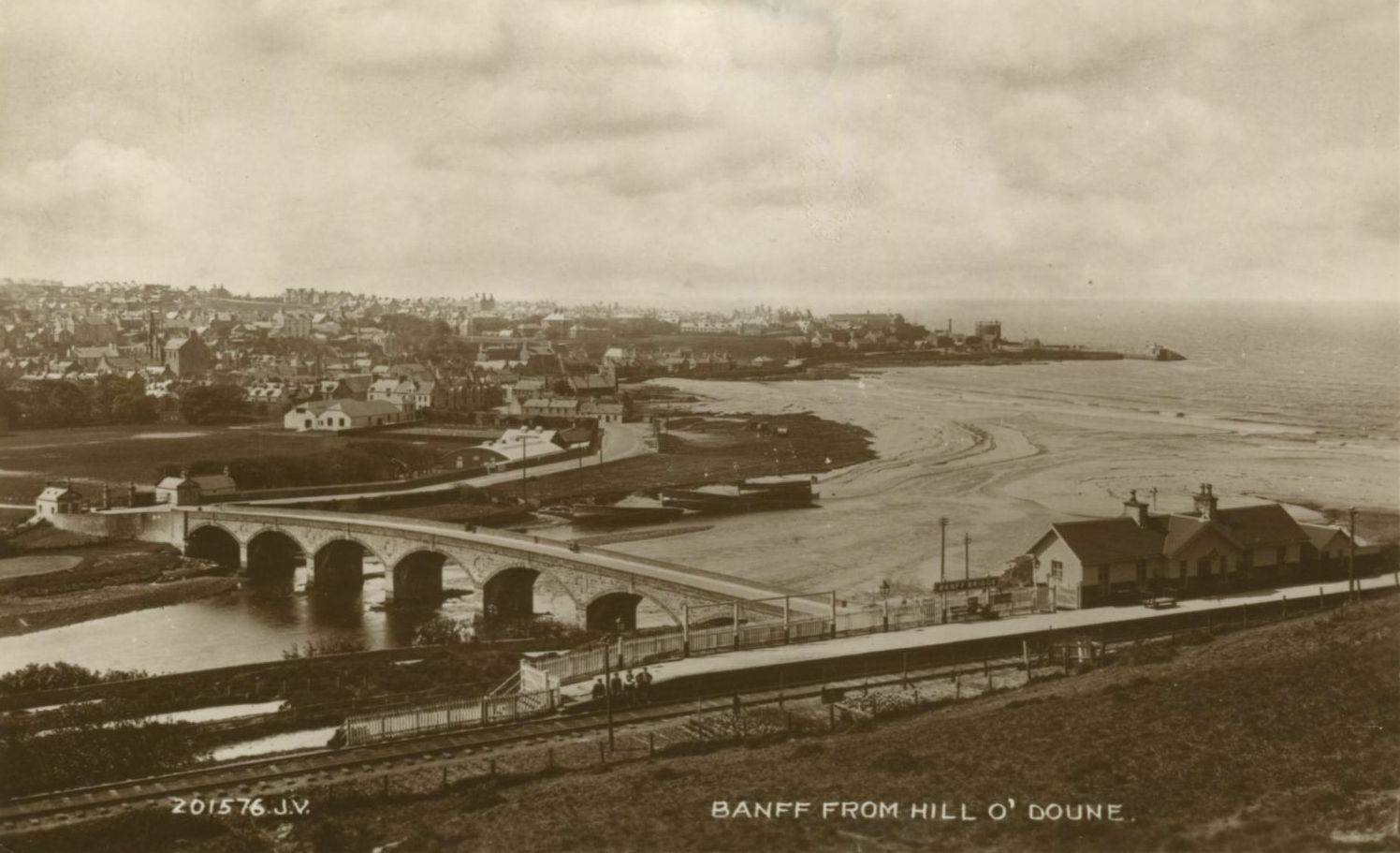
Banff Bridge station, Banff Bridge and Banff itself

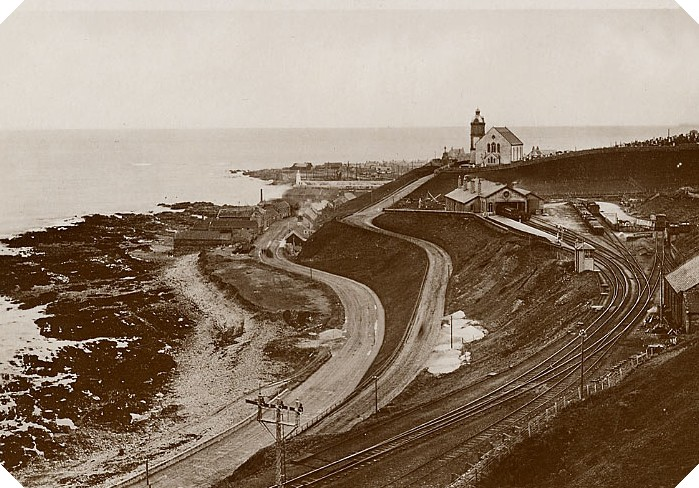
Macduff Railway station photographed prior to WW2.

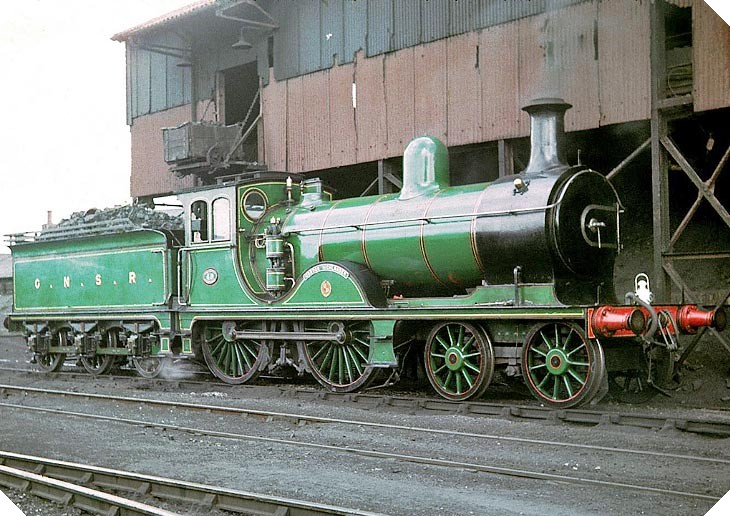
Gordon Highlander taking on coal in 1964.

== Formation and opening ==
As the railway network further south took shape, Aberdeen was connected to the south by the Aberdeen Railway, in 1850. Already consideration had been given to further railway routes in that part of Scotland, and this resulted in the Great North of Scotland Railway (GNoSR) being given its authorising act of Parliament, the Great North of Scotland Railway Act 1846 (9 & 10 Vict. c. ciii), on 26 June 1846.

At that time there were ideas that this could be supplemented by a long branch line through Oldmeldrum and Turriff to Macduff and Banff, but it was seen that at this early date, financing such a line would not be possible. In October 1853 the GNoSR decided to encourage local interested parties to promote a branch line to Banff, and there was a further meeting on 23 October 1854.

Banff, Macduff and Turriff Junction Railway Act 1855
- Act of Parliament
- Parliament of the United Kingdom
- Long title: An Act for making a Railway from the Great North of Scotland Railway to Turriff in the County oi Aberdeen.
- Citation: 18 & 19 Vict. c. lvii

Dates
- Royal assent: 15 June 1855

Text of statute as originally enacted

As the scheme was developed it became obvious that available finance would enable the line to be built only as far as Turriff, a distance of 18 miles, forming a junction with the GNoSR at Inveramsay. (Note: The decision to foreshorten the planned line, to Turriff only, was taken before parliamentary approval, not after, notwithstanding the company's name. See Vallance, page 57) It was submitted to the 1855 session of Parliament; the GNoSR agreed to take £40,000 of shares in the new company, and to work it for 50% of gross receipts. The Banff, Macduff and Turriff Junction Railway was authorised by the Banff, Macduff and Turriff Junction Railway Act 1855 (18 & 19 Vict. c. lvii) on 15 June 1855, with capital of £120,000.

The engineer was John Gibb and Son (Note: John Gibb himself had died in 1850; his son Alexander carried on the engineering business of John Gibb and Son.) and the contractor for the construction of the line was John Brebner of Aberdeen; he was to be paid £109,550 for the work. Colonel Yolland carried out an inspection for the Board of Trade in September 1857 and found everything acceptable, so the line was opened to the public on 5 September 1857.

== The line in use ==
The line climbed away from Inveramsay gaining 164 feet (50 m) of altitude to Rothienorman, then descending to Turriff losing 264 feet (80 m) of altitude, partly by means of a long 1 in 80 gradient. Stations were at Wartle, Rothie Norman, Fyvie and Auchterless, and Turriff itself. Three trains ran each way daily, not venturing on to the main line beyond Inveramsay, which was opened specifically as the junction interchange station.

Aberdeen and Turriff Railway Amendment Act 1859
- Act of Parliament
- Parliament of the United Kingdom
- Long title: An Act to grant further Powers to "The Banff, Macduff, and Turriff Junction Railway Company," and to change the Name of the Company.
- Citation: 22 Vict. c. xi

Dates
- Royal assent: 19 April 1859

Usage of the line was disappointing and financial performance was accordingly very difficult. Gross income only just exceeded operating expenses and loan interest, and the take-up of shares fell short. An issue of preference shares was proposed to liquidate the debt. On 19 April 1859 the company obtained the Aberdeen and Turriff Railway Amendment Act 1859 (22 Vict. c. xi) enabling the issue of the preference shares, and changing the name of the company to the Aberdeen and Turriff Railway.

The state of the money market was such that the preference shares were not taken up until 1865, when it was the Great North of Scotland Railway that took them. The local company made an operating loss of over £1,000 in 1859 and in 1860, and small profits in later years. Losses reappeared in 1864 and 1865 and it was obvious that the Aberdeen and Turriff Railway Company could not continue. The GNoSR took it over by the Great North of Scotland Railway (Amalgamation) Act 1866 (29 & 30 Vict. c. cclxxxviii) of 30 July 1866.

== Connecting Macduff ==
Although the Turriff line never reached Macduff, the idea of a railway connection was perpetuated. The alternative railway route to the area, reaching Banff from Portsoy and the west, would disadvantage the community of Macduff commercially, and that fact gave emphasis to the revival of a connection to Turriff.

Banff, MacDuff and Turriff Extension Railway Act 1857
- Act of Parliament
- Parliament of the United Kingdom
- Long title: An Act to incorporate a Company for extending the Banff, Macduff, and Turriff Junction Railway from Turriff to Banff and Macduff.
- Citation: 20 & 21 Vict. c. l

Dates
- Royal assent: 27 July 1857

Text of statute as originally enacted

The Banff, Macduff and Turriff Extension Railway was authorised by the Banff, MacDuff and Turriff Extension Railway Act 1857 (20 & 21 Vict. c. l) of 27 July 1857. Share capital was to be £80,000, and the GNoSR could invest £5,000. The Macduff terminus was to be about half a mile short of the east end of Banff Bridge over the River Deveron; the intention was that it would serve both Banff and Macduff, and the station took that name. In being located there it would be a mile from the centre of both places. This time the ruling gradient was to be 1 in 66, thereby avoiding expensive earthworks.

The GNoSR was pessimistic about the line: a shareholders' meeting was told

[The Turriff line had] cost around £145,000 to build, and still needing a further £5,000 to complete its works, had since its opening yielded the miserable amount of only £6,769, and could report a free balance after costs and interest, of only £200 5s 8d. The local area had raised only £14- or £15,000 of the capital, less than the purchase cost of land for the line, £18,000. So few of its ordinary shares had been taken up that the Banff Macduff & Turriff Junction company had to apply to Parliament for authority to issue 5% preference stock.

Once again share subscription was extremely slow to come in, and construction was correspondingly delayed. In the spring 1859 the line had been built as far as Keilhill (King Edward) and in 1860 it was extended to Gellymill. The terminus there was now to be named "Banff and Macduff". (Note: The location was located at a levelled area on the hillside to the immediate north of the later alignment, on the 35 metre contour on modern 1:25,000 Ordnance Survey maps. There was a half-mile long sloping approach road from Banff Bridge, which crossed the River Deveron, giving access to Banff. Grant (page 27) has the station 11 miles from Macduff, but this is a mistake for the earlier Turriff terminus.)

On 27 June Colonel Rich inspected and approved the Macduff extension. Banff's town clerk had written to suggest that the harbour station, on the Portsoy line, be renamed Banff North and the new station on the extension be Banff South: the Great North declined to change the harbour station's name, and called the new station Banff Bridge.

On 1 June 1860 the Board of Trade inspection took place, and the public opening followed on 4 June 1860 without ceremony; the line was worked by the GNoSR. The terminus was named Banff & Macduff, until on 1 August 1866 it was changed to Macduff. New intermediate stations were Plaidy, and King Edward.

== Opening of the Banff, Portsoy and Strathisla Railway ==
On 2 August 1859, the Banff, Portsoy and Strathisla Railway opened to the public. It had a Banff terminus, on the west side of the River Deveron. This had an immediate effect in abstracting traffic from the Turriff station, which was eleven miles from Macduff.

At a meeting of shareholders of the Aberdeen and Turriff Railway on 30 November 1860, the chairman John Stewart told the shareholders that though the opening of the Banff Harbour line from Grange had diverted much of the traffic away from their own line, the planned extension from Turriff to Macduff "will not only bring back the greater portion of the traffic thus diverted, but will probably add to its amount. And the working of that line and yours continuously under one system will prove mutually advantageous to both companies". Ross comments that "This was wishful thinking of a high order."

== Absorption into the Great North of Scotland Railway, and a short extension ==
The company's finances were as desperate as before, and payments on mortgage debt became impossible. From 30 June 1862 the GNoSR became guarantor. Once again the GNoSR found itself working a nominally independent, and loss-making, company, and it was agreed in June 1866 to take it into GNoSR ownership.

The GNoSR obtained a general amalgamation act of Parliament, the Great North of Scotland Railway (Amalgamation) Act 1866 (29 & 30 Vict. c. cclxxxviii), with other provisions on 30 July 1866; these included a further extension from the existing terminus to Macduff itself. The GNoSR took its time about making the extension, but Colonel Rich of the Board of Trade made an inspection on 28 June 1872, and the extension opened on 1 July 1872. The cost of the extension as declared in the authorising act of Parliament had been £5,356. The former terminus was now closed; there was a new intermediate station at Banff Bridge.

== Accidents ==
A fatal accident took place on the line on 27 November 1882, as the 4:20 p.m. mixed train from Macduff to Inveramsay was crossing the Inverythan Road Bridge, between Auchterless and Fyvie. The train was formed with five goods wagons and a brake van in front of four passenger coaches. The engine and the first two wagons crossed the bridge, but one of the wagons had derailed, and the remaining four goods vehicles and the first two passenger coaches fell 30 feet to the roadway, and were completely destroyed.

Five passengers were killed, and 18 others injured. An examination of the wreckage revealed a manufacturing defect in one of the cast iron girders of the bridge, which suffered brittle fracture and collapsed.

A derailment took place at Wartle on 2 July 1885; two passengers and the train guard were injured. The Board of Trade inspecting officer, Colonel Marindin, found that the immediate cause was distortion of the track, and that the distortion was probably caused by expansion of the rails in the summer heat. There was no evidence that fishplates had been greased to allow for this.

== Passenger train services ==
Train services in the early days were three (or for brief periods four) round trips daily. None of the passenger trains ran beyond Inveramsay. By 1895 there were five trains each way daily, and that pattern continued until closure. However the 1938 public (Bradshaw) timetable shows an additional Sunday round trip, running from Macduff to Wartle only.

== Locomotives ==
The early locomotives to work the line were Class 1 2-4-0s designed by D. K. Clark and built by William Fairbairn & Sons of Manchester. These were fitted with Clark's patent smoke preventing system. They had a series of holes in the sides of the firebox above the fuel, that allowed jets of steam to be projected. The steam circulated air in the firebox. This better combustion is also reported to have resulted in improved fuel economy. Later Class F 4-4-0s were used. One of these employed was the LNER Class D40 Gordon Highlander currently (2022) in preservation owned by Glasgow Museum of Transport and on display at the Scottish Railway Preservation Society, Bo'ness. Coaches used were of the 4 and 6 wheeled type.

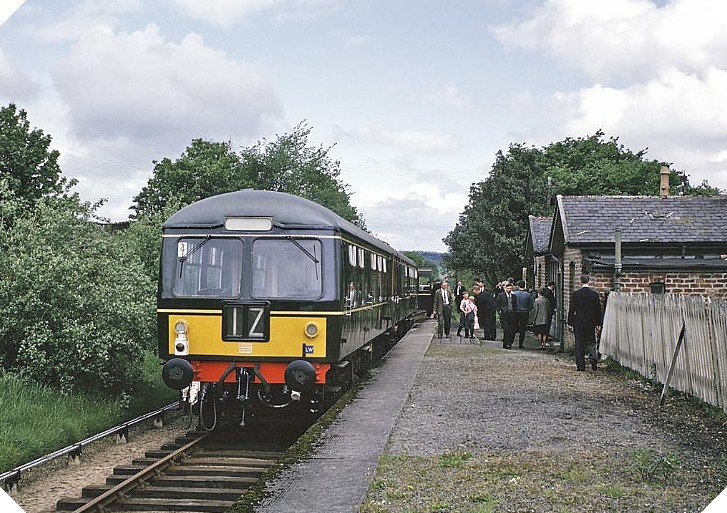
Special rail excursion at Fyvie en route to Turriff in May 1965 just before the line was closed completely.

== Closure ==
In common with many branch lines in rural districts, road competition for both passengers and goods was severe from the 1930s onward, leading to a steep decline in use of the railway.

By 1951 the line had become totally uneconomic, and British Railways, who now owned the line, closed it to passengers on 1 October 1951. Goods traffic continued until 1 August 1961 beyond Turriff, and total closure took place on 3 January 1966.

== Locations ==
- Inveramsay; opened 5 September 1857; closed 1 October 1951;
- Wartle; opened 5 September 1857; closed 1 October 1951;
- Rothie; opened 5 September 1857; renamed Rothie -Norman 1 March 1870; closed 1 October 1951;
- Fyvie; opened 5 September 1857; closed 1 October 1951;
- Auchterless; opened 5 September 1857; closed 1 October 1951;
- Turriff; opened 5 September 1857; closed 1 October 1951;
- Plaidy; opened 4 June 1860; closed 22 May 1944;
- King Edward; opened 4 June 1860; closed 1 October 1951;
- Macduff Banff; opened 4 June 1860; closed 1 July 1872;
- Banff Bridge; opened 1 July 1872; closed 1 October 1951;
- Macduff; opened 1 July 1872; closed 1 October 1951.
