= Banffshire =

Coordinates: 57°30′N 3°05′W

- Historic county
- Banffshire shown within Scotland

- Flag of Banffshire, registered in 2023
- Interactive map of Banffshire
- Country: Scotland
- County town: Banff

Area
  - Total: 640 sq mi (1,660 km^{2})
- Ranked 13th of 34
- Chapman code: BAN
- Website: www.lordlieutenantbanffshire.co.uk

Banffshire (/ˈbænfʃər/; Scots: Coontie o Banffshire; Scottish Gaelic: Siorrachd Bhanbh) is a historic county in Scotland. The county town is Banff, although the largest settlement is Buckie to the west. The historic county ceased to be used for local government purposes in 1975. Since 1996 the area has been split between the Aberdeenshire and Moray council areas. The historic county boundaries of Banffshire are still used for certain functions, being a registration county and lieutenancy area.

It borders the Moray Firth to the north, Moray and Inverness-shire to the west, and Aberdeenshire to the east and south.

== History ==
Considerable evidence of prehistoric human habitation exists in the area, particularly near the coast. Examples include the cairn at Longman Hill and Cairn Lee, near the Burn of Myrehouse.

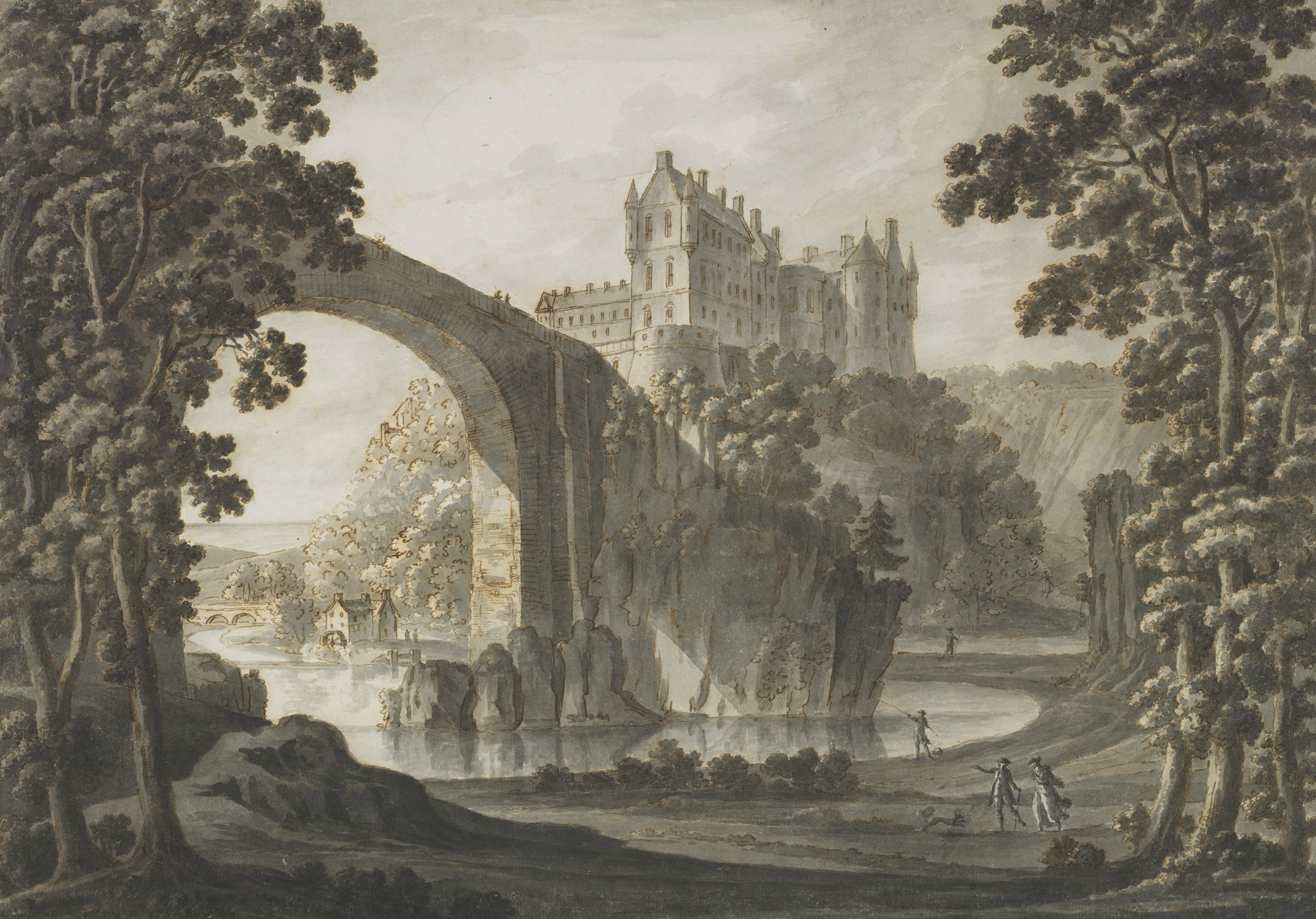
Cullen House

The area also includes the ruins of several medieval castles and the 12th century kirk of Gamrie.

Banffshire's origins as a shire (the area administered by a sheriff) are obscure. There is some evidence that it was a shire from the time of David I (reigned 1124–1153), but the earliest documented Sheriff of Banff was in the 13th century.

The sheriff's jurisdiction covered a number of provincial lordships which then existed between the larger provinces of Moray to the west and Buchan to the east. The lordships included Boyne and Enzie on the coast, plus the inland areas of Strathisla and several small lordships along the eastern side of the strath of the River Spey and its tributaries, including Glenlivet, Strathavon and Glenfiddich. The shire was long and thin; the main towns were generally in the wider part to the north near the coast, but the shire had a long, more sparsely populated, tail extending some 50 miles (80 km) along the Spey into the Grampian Mountains.

The boundaries of the older provinces were not always firmly defined, and some of the smaller provincial lordships were sometimes deemed to be subordinate to a larger province. Banffshire was sometimes said to include parts of the provinces of Moray and Buchan.

In 1242, Alexander II granted five named properties associated with the king's forest of Banff in the hills flanking the Deveron Valley to Waleran de Normanville.

Over time, Scotland's shires became more significant than the old provinces, with more administrative functions being given to the sheriffs. In 1667 Commissioners of Supply were established for each shire, which would serve as the main administrative body for the area until the creation of county councils in 1890. Following the Acts of Union in 1707, the English term 'county' came to be used interchangeably with the older term 'shire'.

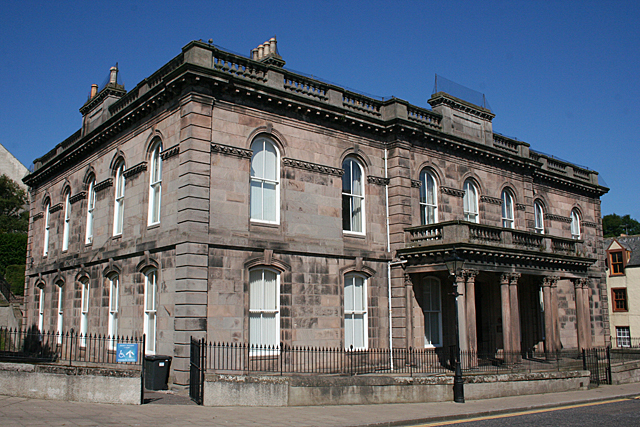
Banff Sheriff Court: Meeting place of Banffshire County Council 1890–1975

Elected county councils were established in 1890 under the Local Government (Scotland) Act 1889, taking most of the functions of the commissioners (which were eventually abolished in 1930). Banffshire County Council held its first meeting on 22 May 1890 at Banff Sheriff Court, the county's main courthouse (built 1871) which also served as the meeting place for the commissioners.

The 1889 Act also led to a review of boundaries, with exclaves being transferred to a county they actually bordered, and parish and county boundaries being adjusted to eliminate cases where parishes straddled county boundaries. There were several such changes affecting the boundaries of Banffshire. Prior to these boundary changes Banffshire included four detached parts surrounded by Aberdeenshire, the largest of which was the parish of St Fergus, and several parishes straddled the county boundaries. The boundary changes all took effect on 15 May 1891.

The county council initially established its offices at 8 Low Street, opposite the sheriff court. In 1934 it bought St Leonard's House on Sandyhill Road in Banff, converting that to be its main offices instead. Council meetings continued to be held at the sheriff court.

In 1975 the Local Government (Scotland) Act 1973 reorganised local government in Scotland into a two-tier system of regions and districts. Banffshire was all included within the Grampian region, but the old county was split between two of the lower-tier districts. The north-east of Banffshire, including the town of Banff, went to the Banff and Buchan district. The west and south of Banffshire went to the new Moray district.

In 1996 the Scottish local government system was reorganised again, this time into single-tier council areas. The Moray district became one of the new council areas, whilst the Banff and Buchan district merged with Gordon and Kincardine and Deeside to become the new Aberdeenshire council area. The modern council areas of Moray and Aberdeenshire therefore cover different areas to the historic counties after which they are named.

The boundaries of the pre-1975 county of Banffshire are still used for some limited official purposes connected with land registration, being a registration county. The pre-1975 county of Banffshire also serves as a lieutenancy area.

== Geography ==
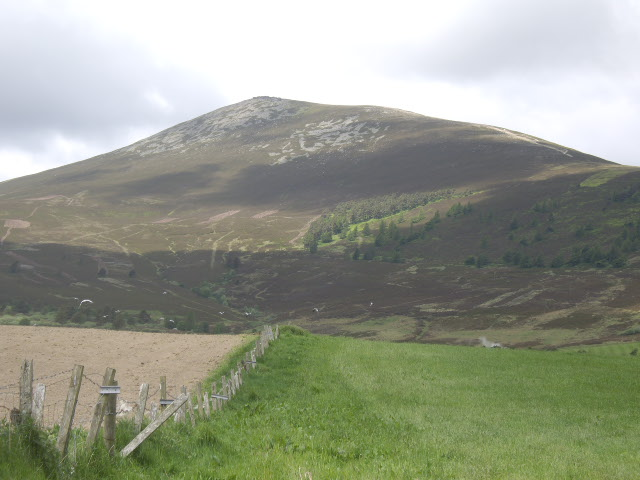
Ben Rinnes

Banffshire consists of a 30-mile stretch of coast along the Moray Firth from Spey Bay to Cullykhan Bay, the immediate hinterland, plus a long, tapering 'tail' stretching inland some 55 or so miles, thus giving the county an elongated shape.

== Civil parishes ==
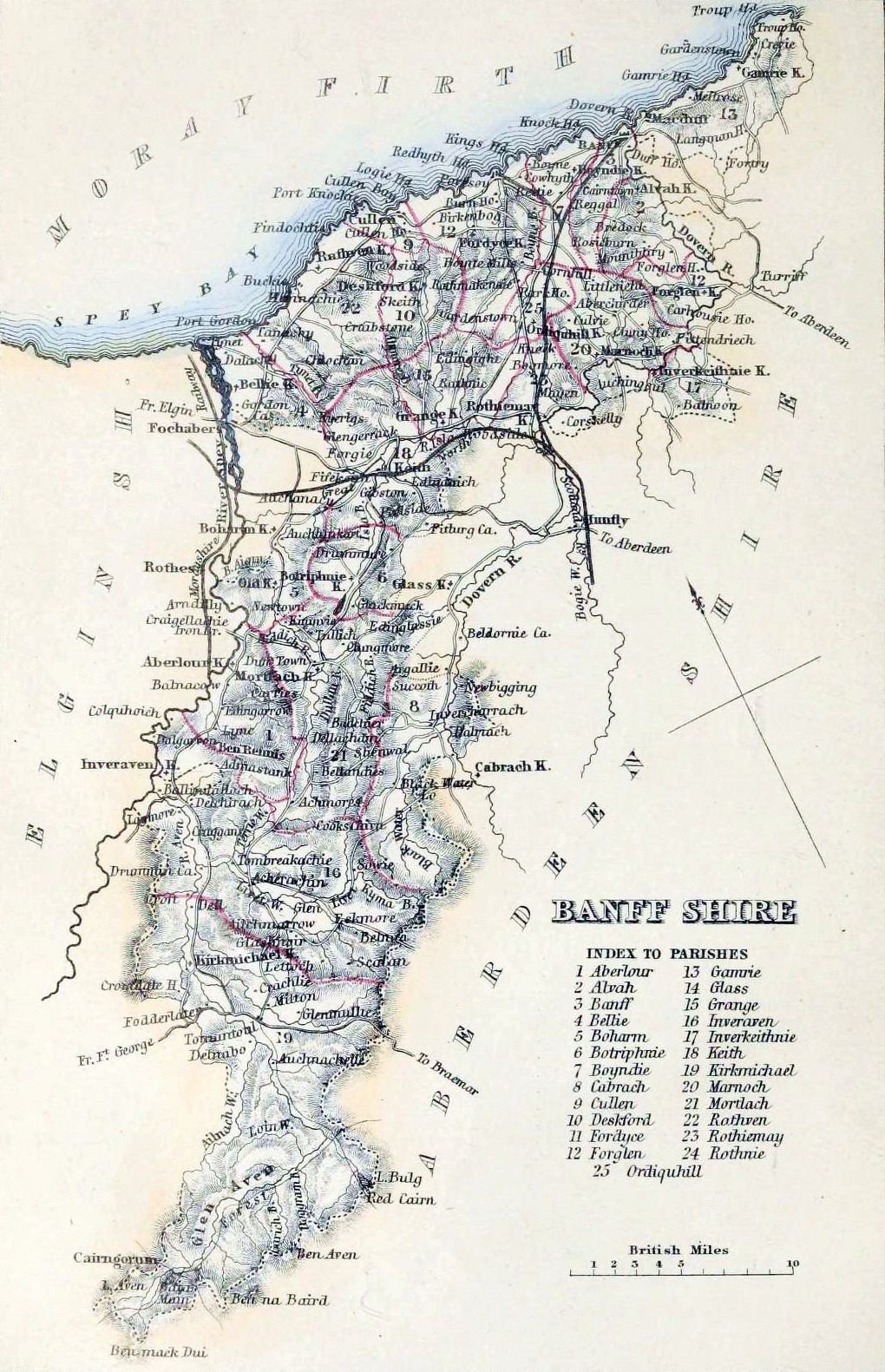
Banffshire civil parish map c. 1854

Civil parishes are still used for some statistical purposes, and separate census figures are published for them. As their areas have been largely unchanged since the 19th century this allows for comparison of population figures over an extended period of time.

From 1845 to 1930, parishes formed part of the local government system of Scotland, having parochial boards from 1845 to 1894 and parish councils from 1894 to 1930. Following the boundary changes of 1891, there were 21 parishes in Banffshire:

- Aberlour (included burgh of Charlestown of Aberlour, commonly known as Aberlour)
- Alvah
- Banff (included burgh of same name)
- Boharm
- Botriphnie
- Boyndie
- Cabrach
- Cullen (included burgh of same name)
- Deskford
- Fordyce (included burgh of Portsoy)
- Forglen
- Gamrie (included burgh of Macduff)
- Grange
- Inveravon
- Inverkeithny
- Keith (included burgh of same name)
- Kirkmichael
- Marnoch (included burgh of Aberchirder)
- Mortlach (included burgh of Dufftown)
- Ordiquhill
- Rathven (included burghs of Buckie, Findochty, and Portknockie)
- Rothiemay

== Settlements ==
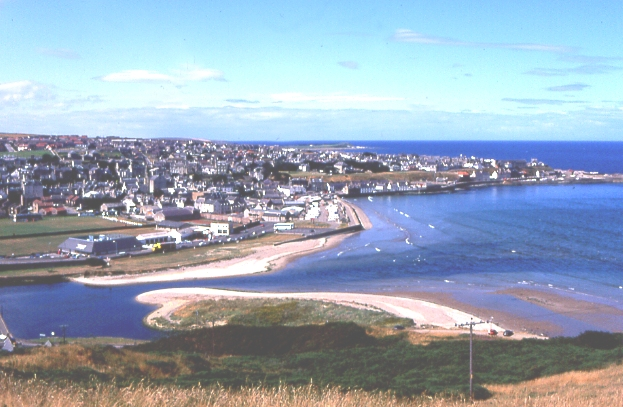
Banff

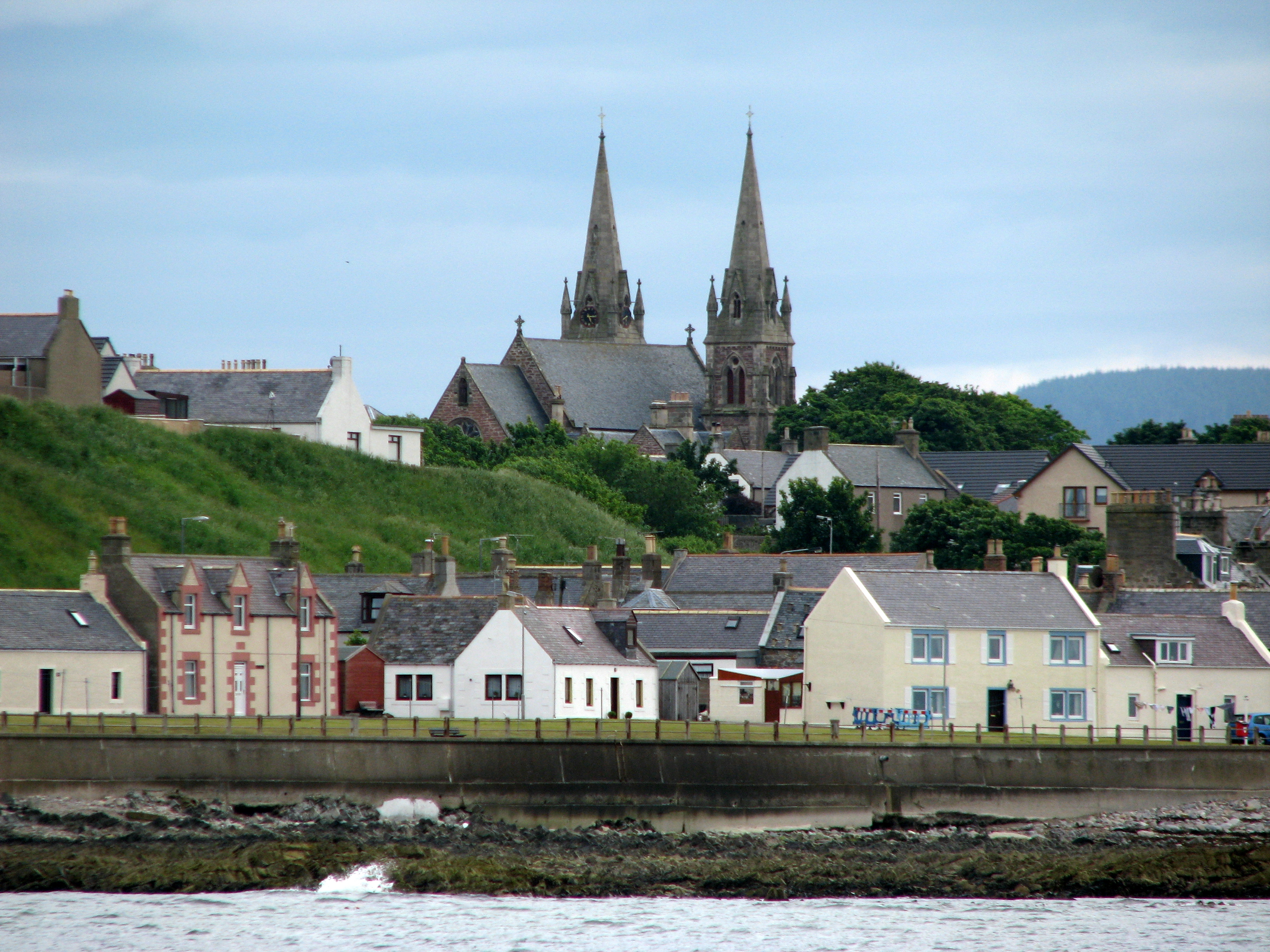
Buckie

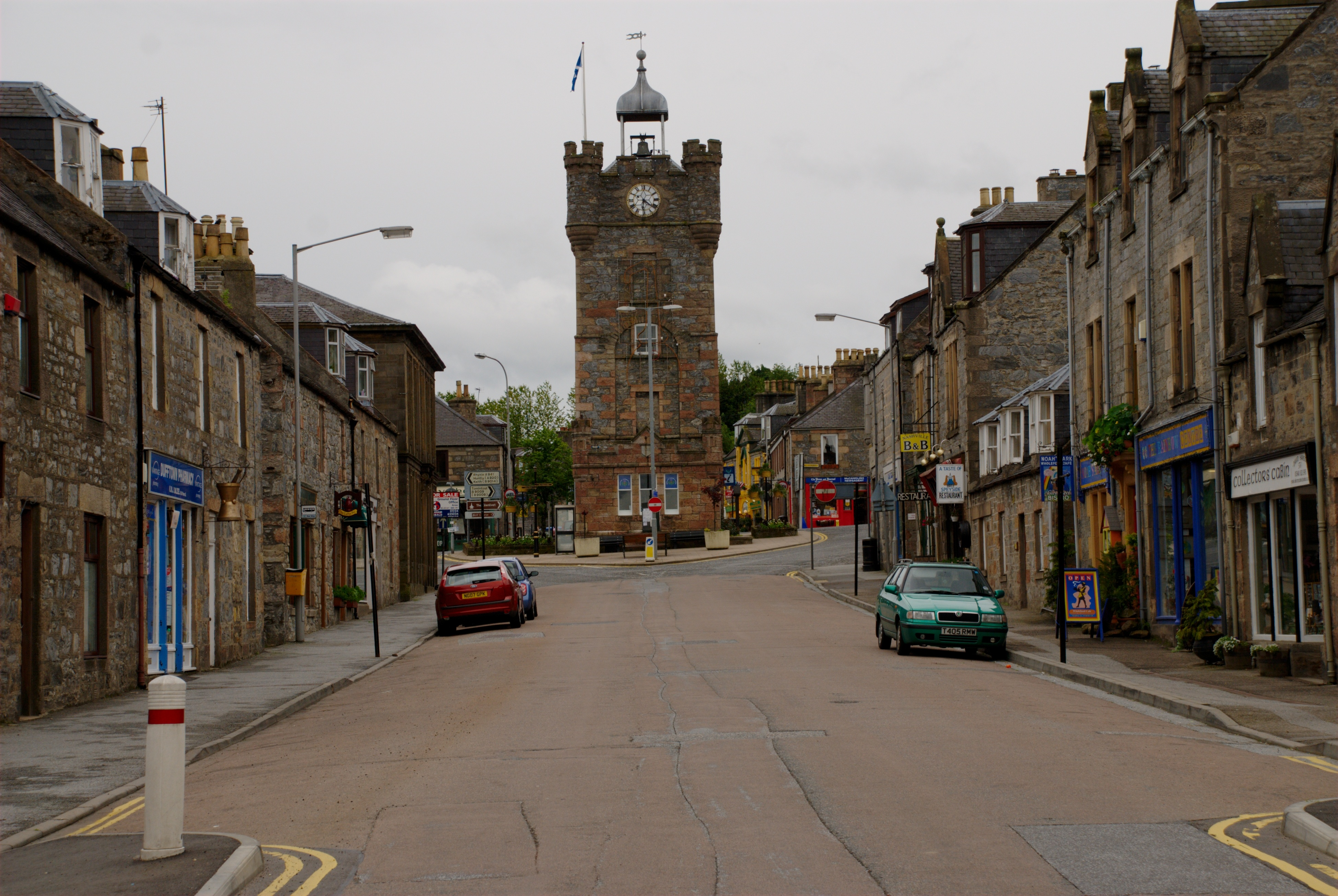
Dufftown

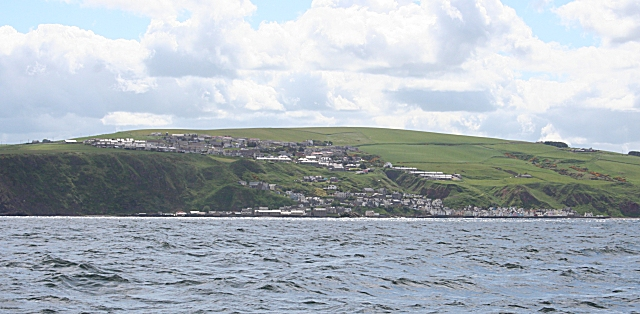
Gardenstown

- Aberchirder
- Banff
- Boyndie
- Buckie
- Charlestown of Aberlour
- Cornhill
- Craigellachie
- Cullen
- Dufftown
- Findochty
- Fordyce
- Gardenstown
- Glenlivet
- Ianstown
- Keith
- Macduff
- Marypark
- Milltown of Rothiemay
- Newmill
- Portessie
- Portgordon
- Portknockie
- Portsoy
- Rathven
- Sandend
- Spey Bay
- Tomintoul
- Upper Dallachy
- Whitehills

== Transport ==
The Aberdeen–Inverness railway line runs through the town of Keith in the north of the county.

== Architecture ==
=== Principal mansions ===
Principal mansions in Banffshire c. 1854 The Imperial Gazetteer of Scotland (1854) Vol. I. by the Rev. John Marius Wilson lists the following :

- Auchintoul
- Auchlunkart House (A. Steuart)
- Balveny Castle or Balvenie Castle
- Cairfield House (John Gordon)
- Cullen House (Earl of Seafield)
- Duff House
- Edingight House (Major A.F. Innes Taylor)
- Forglen House and Birkenbog (Sir Robert Abercrombie)
- Gordon Castle (Duke of Richmond)
- Letterfourie (Sir William Gordon)
- Mayen House (William Duff)
- Mount-coffer House (Earl of Fife)
- Park House (Colonel Thomas Gordon)
- Rothiemay

=== Castles in Banffshire ===
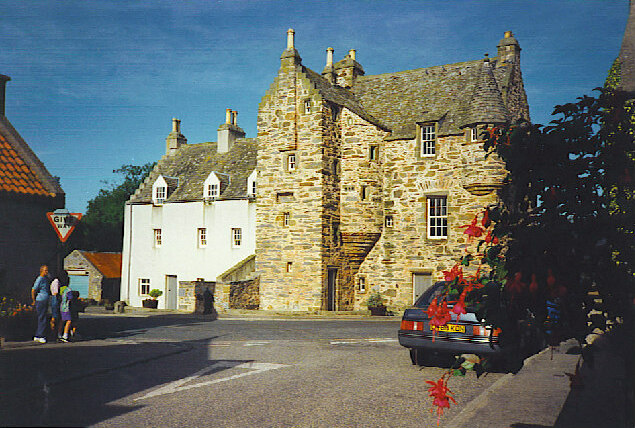
Fordyce Castle, Banffshire

- Auchindune Auchindoun Castle
- Balveny or Balvenie
- Banff
- Cullen (near Cullen)
- Deskford
- Edinglassie
- Findochty
- Galval or Gouldwell Castle (Boharm Civil Parish)
- Grange
- Inchdrewer, Banff Parish
- Park
- Scuth

== Flag ==
In 2023, the Lord Lieutenant of Banffshire organised a competition to design a flag for the county. The winning design is gold, white and blue, and represents rivers, bridges, whisky barrels and the sunset.

== Notable residents ==
- James Abercromby, (1706–1781), born at Glassaugh House, Fordyce, British general in the French and Indian War
- Francis George Cumming (1861–1941), salvation army officer, chaplain, social worker and probation officer
- Captain George Duff (c. 1 February 1764 – 21 October 1805) was a Royal Navy officer during the American War of Independence, the French Revolutionary Wars and the Napoleonic Wars, who was killed by a cannonball at the Battle of Trafalgar. Born in Banff
- James Ferguson (1710–1776), born Rothiemay, astronomer and instrument maker
- George Gauld (surveyor)
- James Grant (1706–1778) Roman Catholic priest who served as an underground missionary on the Isle of Barra and later as the vicar apostolic of the Lowland District of Scotland
- Saint John Ogilvie, (1579–1615), born in Keith was a Scottish Catholic martyr.
- George Stephen, 1st Baron Mount Stephen, 1829–1921, Canadian railway executive who named Banff, Alberta, after his birthplace; Banff National Park and Banff Springs Hotel are linked to Stephen back to Banffshire.

== See also ==
- Lord Lieutenant of Banffshire
- Banffshire (UK Parliament constituency)
- List of counties of Scotland 1890–1975
