= Gamrie Bay =

Bay in Aberdeenshire, Scotland

Coordinates: 57°40′40″N 2°20′20″W

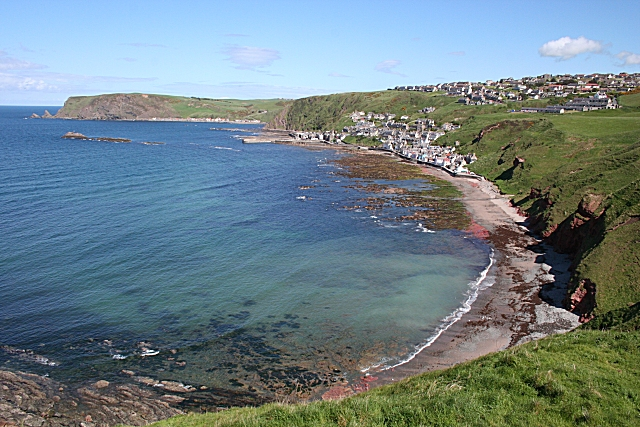
Gamrie Bay

Gamrie Bay is a bay in Aberdeenshire, Scotland. The bay is between Crovie Head and More Head. The villages of Gardenstown and Crovie are located within the bay. A hill fort and the later Castle of Findon stood near the bay entrance of Kirk Den. The ruins of St John’s Church, the former parish church are located at the western end of the bay.
