= Dubford =

Coordinates: 57.6591°N 2.3395°W

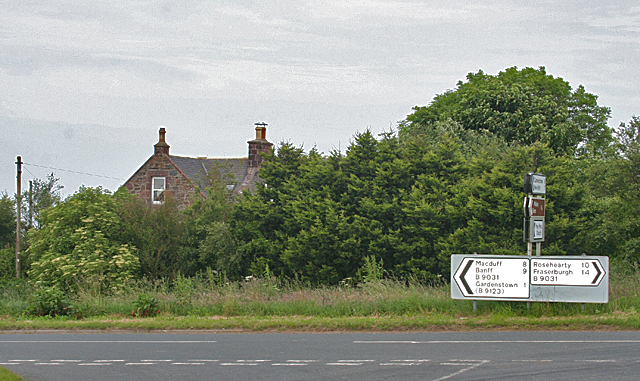

Dubford is a small village in northern coastal Aberdeenshire, Scotland. Dubford is situated along the B9031 road approximately 6 kilometres (3.7 mi) east of Macduff, south of Gardenstown. There is evidence of prehistoric man in the vicinity of Dubford, notably from the nearby Longman Hill and Cairn Lee ancient monuments.
