= List of shipwrecks in January 1835 =

The list of shipwrecks in January 1835 includes ships sunk, foundered, wrecked, grounded or otherwise lost during January 1835.

== 1 January ==
List of shipwrecks: 1 January 1835
Ship	State	Description
Amis	France	The ship struck a sunken wreck in the English Channel and foundered. She was on a voyage from St. Ubes, Spain, to Dunkerque, Nord.

== 2 January ==
List of shipwrecks: 2 January 1835
Ship	State	Description
Friends Goodwill	United Kingdom	The ship was sighted on this date whilst on a voyage from Terceira, Azores, Portugal, to London. No further trace, presumed foundered with the loss of all hands.
HNLMS Pylades	Royal Netherlands Navy	The paddle steamer sprang a leak and foundered off Hellevoetsluis, South Holland, with the loss of a crew member. She was on a voyage from Rotterdam, South Holland, to Batavia, Netherlands East Indies.
Sarah	United States	The ship was wrecked on Machias Seal Island. New Brunswick, British North America with the loss of seventeen of the 23 people on board. She was on a voyage from Boston, Massachusetts, to Eastport, Maine.

== 3 January ==
List of shipwrecks: 3 January 1835
Ship	State	Description
Anna	(United Kingdom of Great Britain and Ireland) British North America	The ship was abandoned in the Atlantic Ocean (46°N 13°W). She was on a voyage from Newfoundland to Bilbao, Spain.
Foveran	(United Kingdom of Great Britain and Ireland) British North America	The barque departed from Port Medway, Nova Scotia, for Newport, Monmouthshire, United Kingdom. No further trace, presumed foundered with the loss of all hands.
Greenwell	United Kingdom	The ship was driven ashore and wrecked at Madeira, Portugal, with the loss of five of her crew.

== 6 January ==
List of shipwrecks: 6 January 1835
Ship	State	Description
Mary	United States	The ship was wrecked near St. John's, Newfoundland, British North America. She was on a voyage from Philadelphia, Pennsylvania, to St. John's.
Rifleman	United Kingdom	The ship was driven ashore at Plymouth, Massachusetts, United States. She was on a voyage from Tobago to Halifax, Nova Scotia, British North America.

== 7 January ==
List of shipwrecks: 7 January 1835
Ship	State	Description
Juno	United Kingdom	The ship was in collision with Juno ( Bremen) off Gibraltar and was abandoned. She was on a voyage from Newfoundland to Trieste.

== 8 January ==
List of shipwrecks: 8 January 1835
Ship	State	Description
Hope	United Kingdom	The ship was driven ashore at Flamborough Head, Yorkshire. She was on a voyage from London to Kirkcaldy, Fife. Hope was refloated on 12 January and taken in to Bridlington.

== 9 January ==
List of shipwrecks: 9 January 1835
Ship	State	Description
Chieftain	United Kingdom	The steamship ran aground on the Ship Rock, in the Irish Sea. She was on a voyage from Belfast, County Antrim, to Liverpool, Lancashire.
Favourite	flag unknown	The ship was driven ashore at Lista, Norway. She was on a voyage from Vaasa, Grand Duchy of Finland, to Marseille, Bouches-du-Rhône, France.
Ferdinand	Stettin	The ship was driven ashore in the Sound of Hoy. She was on a voyage from Stettin to Ramsey, Isle of Man.

== 10 January ==
List of shipwrecks: 10 January 1835
Ship	State	Description
Jean Geddes	United Kingdom	The sloop was driven ashore and wrecked at Banff, Aberdeenshire. Her crew were rescued. She was on a voyage from a Caithness port to Banff.
Vine	United Kingdom	The ship was driven ashore at Maryport, Cumberland. She was on a voyage from Dumfries to Maryport.

== 12 January ==
List of shipwrecks: 12 January 1835
Ship	State	Description
Courier du Senegal	France	The ship sprang a leak and was abandoned in the Bay of Biscay. Her crew were rescued by Auguste (France). Courier du Senegal was on a voyage from Senegal to Nantes. Loire-Inférieure.
Laurel	United Kingdom	The brig was driven ashore and severely damaged at Arbroath, Forfarshire.
Rose	(United Kingdom of Great Britain and Ireland) New South Wales	The cutter foundered in Broken Bay.

== 13 January ==
List of shipwrecks: 13 January 1835
Ship	State	Description
Corsair	United Kingdom	The whaler was wrecked in the Kingsmill Islands. Her 31 crew reached land, but were attacked by the natives. Fifteen of them were left behind and are presumed to have been killed.
Henry and Thomas	United Kingdom	The ship was driven ashore at St. John's Point, County Down. She was on a voyage from Belfast, County Antrim, to Dundee, Forfarshire.
San Francisco de Paulo e San Giuseppi	flag unknown	The ship was wrecked at "Hoberwick", Norway. She was on a voyage from Hamburg to Bergen, Norway.
Sovereign	United States	The ship was driven ashore and wrecked at Squam Beach, New Hampshire, United States, with the loss of one life. She was on a voyage from London to New York, United States.
St. Patrick	(United Kingdom of Great Britain and Ireland) New South Wales	The boat foundered in Botany Bay with the loss of all four crew.
Wilson	United Kingdom	The ship lost her rudder and was beached at Great Yarmouth, Norfolk. She was on a voyage from Shediac, New Brunswick, British North America, to Hull, Yorkshire. Wilson was refloated on 15 January and taken in to Great Yarmouth.

== 15 January ==
List of shipwrecks: 15 January 1835
Ship	State	Description
John and Ann	United Kingdom	The ship was run down and sunk in the North Sea off Great Yarmouth, Norfolk. Her crew survived.

== 16 January ==
List of shipwrecks: 16 January 1835
Ship	State	Description
Bertha	Prussia	The ship was driven ashore at Helsingborg, Sweden. Her crew were rescued. She was on a voyage from Memel to Dundee, Forfarshire, United Kingdom.
Henrietta Frederika	Hamburg	The ship was driven aground between Saltholm, Denmark and Malmö, Sweden. She was refloated by 30 January and taken in to Copenhagen, Denmark.
Jane Bourne	United Kingdom	The ship was driven ashore at Rye, Sussex. Her crew were rescued. She was on a voyage from Shoreham-by-Sea, Sussex, to Portsmouth, Hampshire.
Kitty or Mary	United Kingdom	The sloop was driven ashore at Brighton, Sussex. Her crew were rescued. She was on a voyage from Bognor, Sussex, to Shoreham-by-Sea.

== 17 January ==
List of shipwrecks: 17 January 1835
Ship	State	Description
Charlotte	Stettin	The ship was driven ashore and wrecked on the west coast of Jutland with the loss of three of her crew. She was on a voyage from King's Lynn, Norfolk, United Kingdom, to Stettin.
Jane	United Kingdom	The ship was driven ashore at Berck, Pas-de-Calais, France. She was on a voyage from Bognor to Shoreham-by-Sea, Sussex.
Witham	United Kingdom	The ship was driven ashore and wrecked at Scheveningen, South Holland, Netherlands. Her crew were rescued. She was on a voyage from London to Antwerp, Belgium.

== 18 January ==
List of shipwrecks: 18 January 1835
Ship	State	Description
Abeona	United Kingdom	The ship was lost on the "Harborough Sands". Her crew were rescued. She was on a voyage from Cardiff, Glamorgan, to Blyth, Northumberland.
Adventure	United Kingdom	The sloop departed from Sunderland, County Durham, for Portsoy, Aberdeenshire. No further trace, presumed foundered in the North Sea with the loss of all hands.
Aurora	France	The ship foundered off Port-de-Bouc, Bouches-du-Rhône. She was on a voyage from Mogador, Morocco, to Marseille, Bouches-du-Rhône.
Bishop Blaize	United Kingdom	The ship foundered in the North Sea off Lowestoft, Suffolk. Her crew were rescued. She was on a voyage from Hull, Yorkshire, to London.
Cornubia	United Kingdom	The ship was driven ashore and wrecked at Dungeness, Kent, with the loss of her captain. She was on a voyage from London to Penzance, Cornwall.
London Packet	United Kingdom	The ship was lost on the Stone Bank, in the North Sea off the mouth of the Humber. She was on a voyage from Hull to Glasgow, Renfrewshire.
Lord Exmouth	United Kingdom	The ship was driven ashore and wrecked at Dungeness. Her crew were rescued. She was on a voyage from Sierra Leone to London.
Underhill	United Kingdom	The ship was driven ashore and damaged at Penzance, Cornwall. She was refloated on 27 January and taken in to Penzance.

== 19 January ==
List of shipwrecks: 19 January 1835
Ship	State	Description
Bell	United Kingdom	The schooner was driven ashore and wrecked at "Redheugh" with the loss of all three crew. She was on a voyage from Newcastle upon Tyne, Northumberland, to Montrose, Forfarshire.
Brothers	United Kingdom	The sloop was driven ashore and wrecked east of "Redheugh", 13 nautical miles (24 km) east of Dunbar with the loss of all hands.
Dispatch	United Kingdom	The sloop was driven ashore between Dunbar, Lothian and St. Abb's Head, Berwickshire. Her crew were rescued.
Jessie	United Kingdom	The ship was wrecked at Ballycastle, County Antrim. Her crew were rescued. She was on a voyage from Portrush, County Antrim, to Campbeltown, Argyllshire.
Lively	United Kingdom	The smack was driven ashore and wrecked at Crovie, Aberdeenshire. Her crew were rescued. She was on a voyage from Leith, Lothian, to Banff, Aberdeenshire.
Marchioness	United Kingdom	The sloop was wrecked at the mouth of the River Spey. Her three crew were rescued. She was on a voyage from Sunderland, County Durham, to Port Gordon, Aberdeenshire.
Maria	Belgium	The galiot was driven ashore and wrecked at Bullock Harbour, County Dublin, United Kingdom. Her crew were rescued. She was on a voyage from Liverpool, Lancashire, to Dublin.
Mercurius	Netherlands	The ship was driven ashore and wrecked at St. Mary's, Isles of Scilly, United Kingdom. She was on a voyage from Padang, Netherlands East Indies, to Middelburg, Zeeland.
Thomas and Ann	United Kingdom	The brig was wrecked near Saltburn-by-the-Sea, Yorkshire with some loss of life.
William Davidson	United Kingdom	The schooner was driven ashore and wrecked at Dunglass, Lothian. She was on a voyage from Sunderland, County Durham, to Wick, Caithness.

== 20 January ==
List of shipwrecks: 20 January 1835
Ship	State	Description
Ark	United Kingdom	The ship was driven ashore at Whitstable, Kent. She was on a voyage from Virginia, United States, to London.
Dee	United Kingdom	The ship was lost on the Burbo Bank, in Liverpool Bay. She was on a voyage from the Isle of Man to Liverpool, Lancashire.
Hunter	United Kingdom	The sloop was wrecked on Lindisfarne, Northumberland, with the loss of all hands.
Mayleyer	Netherlands	The ship was lost off Goree Island, Zeeland. Her crew were rescued.
Nile	United Kingdom	The brig struck the Kisn Bank, in the Irish Sea. She floated off but consequently foundered off Bardsey Island, Caernarfonshire, with the loss of four of her eleven crew. The survivors were rescued by the barque Rebecca (United Kingdom). Nile was on a voyage from Liverpool to Dublin.
Oak	United Kingdom	The ship was driven ashore at Lowestoft, Suffolk. She was on a voyage from Scarborough, Yorkshire, to London.
Ranger	United Kingdom	The ship was run down and sunk in the English Channel off Dungeness, Kent, by Acorn (United Kingdom). Ranger was on a voyage from Sunderland, County Durham, to Shoreham-by-Sea, Sussex.
Royal Adelaide	United Kingdom	The steamship was driven onto the Herd Sand, in the North Sea off the coust of County Durham. She was refloated on 25 January and taken in to South Shields for repairs.
Selima	Belgium	The ship was driven ashore at Mockbeggar, Cheshire, United Kingdom. She was on a voyage from Antwerp to Liverpool.
Transport	United Kingdom	The ship was driven ashore and wrecked near Cloughton Wick, Yorkshire, with the loss of all hands.
William and Isabella	United Kingdom	The ship was driven ashore capsized and crewless at Craster, Northumberland. She was on a voyage from the Tay to Sunderland.
William and Mary	United Kingdom	The ship was driven ashore at Ingoldmells, Lincolnshire. Her crew were rescued. She was on a voyage from London to Goole, Yorkshire.
William Gibbs	United Kingdom	The ship was driven ashore and wrecked at Scheveningen, South Holland, Netherlands. Her crew were rescued by the Scheveningen Lifeboat. She was on a voyage from London to Antwerp.

== 21 January ==
List of shipwrecks: 21 January 1835
Ship	State	Description
Elizabeth	United Kingdom	The ship was wrecked on the Whiting Sand, in the North Sea off the coast of Suffolk.

== 22 January ==
List of shipwrecks: 22 January 1835
Ship	State	Description
Carclew	United Kingdom	The ship was driven ashore at Livorno, Grand Duchy of Tuscany. She was on a voyage from Penzance, Cornwall, to Genoa, Kingdom of Sardinia.
Trefusis	United Kingdom	The ship was driven ashore and severely damaged at Livorno. She was on a voyage from Penzance to Livorno.

== 23 January ==
List of shipwrecks: 23 January 1835
Ship	State	Description
Actiff	France	The ship struck rocks and sank at "Santa Cruz", Rio de Janeiro, Brazil. Her crew were rescued. She was on a voyage from Bordeaux, Gironde, to Rio de Janeiro.
Eliza	United Kingdom	The Chinaman ran aground and was wrecked in the South China Sea off Robert Island, Paracel Islands. Her crew survived.

== 24 January ==
List of shipwrecks: 24 January 1835
Ship	State	Description
Constance	United Kingdom	The ship was run down and sunk in the North Sea off Flamborough Head, Yorkshire, by Hope (United Kingdom) with the loss of a crew member. She was on a voyage from Dundee, Forfarshire, to London.
Iris	Prussia	The ship was driven ashore near Pillau and wrecked. She was on a voyage from Pillau to Rotterdam, South Holland, Netherlands.

== 25 January ==
List of shipwrecks: 25 January 1835
Ship	State	Description
Velocity	United Kingdom	The ship was driven ashore at Rye, Sussex.

== 27 January ==
List of shipwrecks: 27 January 1835
Ship	State	Description
Sandra	United Kingdom	The snow was driven ashore at Flamborough Head before 27 January. She was on her maiden voyage. She was later refloated.

== 28 January ==
List of shipwrecks: 28 January 1835
Ship	State	Description
Amity	United Kingdom	The ship ran aground at Flamborough Head, Yorkshire. She was later refloated.
Amphitrite	United Kingdom	The ship ran aground at Flamborough Head. She was later refloated and taken in to Bridlington.
Anna	United Kingdom	The ship ran aground at Flamborough Head. She was later refloated.
Fame	United Kingdom	The ship ran aground at Flamborough Head. She was later refloated.
Friends	United Kingdom	The ship ran aground at Flamborough Head. She was later refloated.
Walker	United Kingdom	The ship ran aground at Flamborough Head. She was later refloated.
Woodbine	United Kingdom	The ship lost her rudder and was abandoned by her crew. She was subsequently driven ashore and wrecked on the west coast of the Isle of Arran. Woodbine was on a voyage from Galway to London.

== 30 January ==
List of shipwrecks: 30 January 1835
Ship	State	Description
Agnes	United Kingdom	The ship was driven ashore in Broadhaven Bay. She was on a voyage from Westport, County Mayo, to Liverpool, Lancashire.
Sylph	United Kingdom	Sylph and Clive. During a voyage from Singapore to China, the ship was beached at "Bintang" on the coast of the Malay Peninsula. She was refloated with assistance from the East Indiaman Clive (United Kingdom).

== 31 January ==
List of shipwrecks: 31 January 1835
Ship	State	Description
Constance	United Kingdom	The schooner was in collision with the brig Hope (United Kingdom and sank in the North Sea 3 nautical miles (5.6 km) north of Flamborough Head, Yorkshire, with the loss of a crew member. Constance was on a voyage from Perth to London.
Sarah and Marianne	United Kingdom	The ship was driven ashore at Maryport, Cumberland, and was scuttled.

== Unknown date ==
List of shipwrecks: Unknown date 1835
Ship	State	Description
Elizabeth	United Kingdom	The ship was lost in the Saint Lawrence River.
Equity	United Kingdom	The ship foundered off the mouth of the Weser on or before 23 January.
Erin	United Kingdom	The ship was driven ashore at Kinsale, County Cork.
Godfrey	United Kingdom	The ship was driven ashore and wrecked at Ballywalter, County Antrim.
Hope	United Kingdom	The ship foundered in Carnarvon Bay off Pwllheli, Caernarfonshire, before 28 January.
Mediterranean	United Kingdom	The ship departed from Perth for London in mid-January. No further trace, presumed foundered in the North Sea off St. Abb's Head, Berwickshire, with the loss of all hands.
Neptune	United Kingdom	The ship foundered in the Atlantic Ocean with the loss of all hands. She was on a voyage from Saint John, New Brunswick, to Newry, County Antrim.
Numa	United Kingdom	The ship foundered in Trepassey Bay before 9 January.
William and Mary	United Kingdom	The ship was driven ashore and wrecked at Coringa, India, before 23 January.
