= St John's Church, Gamrie =

Ruined church and kirkyard in Aberdeenshire, Scotland

St John's Church
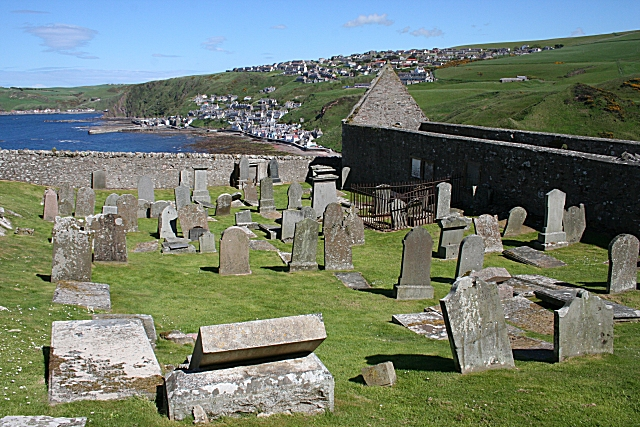
- The church in 2013, looking northeast
- St John's Church
- 57.66955°N 2.35182°W

Scheduled monument
- Official name: St John's Church
- Type: Ecclesiastical: burial ground, cemetery, graveyard; church
- Designated: 4 May 1993
- Reference no.: SM5678

St John's Church is a ruined church and kirkyard in the parish of Gamrie, Aberdeenshire, Scotland. The church, dedicated to St John the Evangelist, was founded in the 11th century. The existing ruins date from the 16th and 17th centuries. The church was known as the "Kirk of Sculls", from the three Danish skulls taken from the Battle of the Bloody Pits in 1004 AD and displayed in the church until the 19th century. Historic Environment Scotland established the site as a scheduled monument in 1993.

== Description ==
St John's Church is located on the north coast of Moray in Aberdeenshire, Scotland. The ruined church and its small burial ground sit on the edge of a cliff overlooking Gamrie Bay and the small, coastal village of Gardenstown. The church is a long, narrow, roofless building, 28.77 m (94.4 ft) by 4.75 m (15.6 ft). It was constructed in two phases; the east end was built in the early 16th century, and was expanded to the west in the 17th century. The rubble-built walls and gables of the church and rubble walled burial ground are the only surviving remains. The walls and gables of the church survive to roof height.

There have been five entrances to the church. In the past, there was an entrance in each gable, along with one in the north wall. They are now blocked. Two unblocked entrances remain in the south wall. There are several window openings of various sizes; most windows are in the south wall. Tombstones lie inside the church walls and in the adjoining walled cemetery. A decorative Barclay of Tolly mural monument with grape and vine mouldings can be found at the east end of the church. The rubble-walled kirkyard has a wide carriage entrance flanked by 19th century rubble gate posts and cast-iron carriage gates. The burial ground contains several mural memorials and tombstones, the earliest dating to the 17th century.

== History ==
St John's Church was established in the 11th century and dedicated to St John the Evangelist. It was granted to the monks of Arbroath Abbey by the Scottish King William the Lion between 1189 and 1198. The present church was built in the early 16th century possibly on the site of the earlier church. During the 17th century, a large, long western extension was added along with additional height at the east end of the church.

The church was known for its collection of macabre skulls. The three heads of defeated Danes were first displayed in the church after the 1004 Battle of the Bloody Pits. The skulls remained on display well into the 19th century in a church alcove. The building was abandoned and fell into ruin after a new church was built in Gardenstown in 1830.

Historic Environment Scotland established the site as a scheduled monument in 1993.
