= Banff Bay =

Coastal embayment in Scotland

- Scottish Gaelic: Bàgh Bhanbh
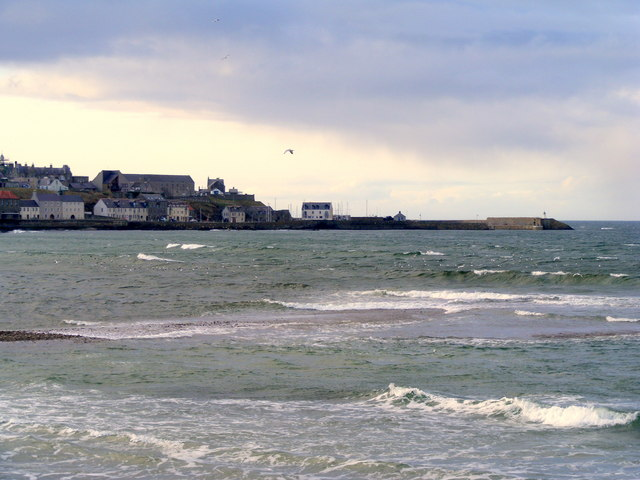

- Location: Aberdeenshire
- Coordinates: 57°40′N 2°31′W
- Type: Bay
- Primary inflows: Burn of Myrehouse

Banff Bay (Scottish Gaelic: Bàgh Bhanbh) is a coastal embayment in Scotland situated between the towns of Banff, Aberdeenshire and Macduff, Aberdeenshire. The Burn of Myrehouse is one of the streams draining to Banff Bay. Banff Bay is a prominent geographical feature along the northern coast of Aberdeenshire, and it is visible from a number of locations along the coastal plain such as Longman Hill situated somewhat distant to the east.

== See also ==
- Foudland Hills
