= Foudland Hills =

Coordinates: 57.611°N 2.923°W

- Location within Scotland

Highest point
- Elevation: 467 m (1,532 ft)
- Prominence: 282 m (925 ft)

Geography
- OS grid: NJ603332

The Foudland Hills is a mountain range in the northwest of Aberdeenshire, Scotland and east of Morayshire. The Foudland Hills are a prominent feature along the northern coastal region of Aberdeenshire, and are visible from somewhat distant points such as Longman Hill to the east.

== See also ==
- Banff Bay
