= Clan Troup =

Scottish clan

- Motto: Veritas Vincit (Truth conquers)
- Clan Troup no longer has a chief, and is an armigerous clan

Clan Troup is a Scottish clan. The clan is considered an armigerous clan, meaning that it is considered to have had at one time a chief who possessed the chiefly arms; however, no one at present is in possession of such arms. The surname Troup is also considered a sept of Clan Gordon.

== History ==
The name Troup comes from the feudal barony of Troup in Aberdeenshire. Hammelin de Troup was in 1320, arrested for his involvement in a conspiracy against King Robert I of Scotland along with Roger de Mowbray, David, Lord of Brechin and Willian de Soules.

== Clan profile ==
- Motto: (Latin: Veritas Vincit - English Truth conquers)
- Crest: A hind's head erased, Proper.

== Castles ==
The following is a list of castles known to have been in the ownership of the family.

- Cullykhan Castle (Troup Castle), overlooking Cullykhan Bay, Aberdeenshire.
- Castle of Findon, overlooking Gamrie Bay, Aberdeenshire.
