= Gardenstown =

Coordinates: 57.6703°N 2.337°W

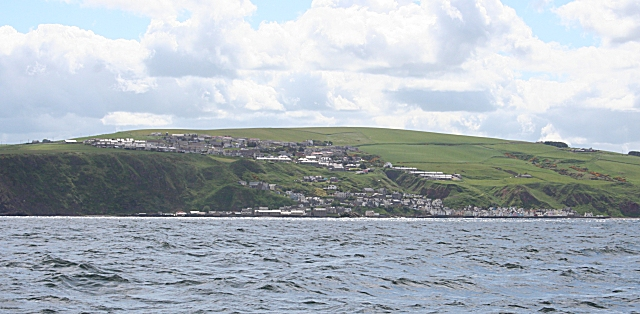
- Gardenstown

- Location within Aberdeenshire
- Population: 560 (2020)
- Council area: Aberdeenshire
- Lieutenancy area: Banffshire
- Country: Scotland
- Sovereign state: United Kingdom
- Post town: BANFF
- Postcode district: AB45
- Dialling code: 01261
- Police: Scotland
- Fire: Scottish
- Ambulance: Scottish
- UK Parliament: Aberdeenshire North and Moray East
- Scottish Parliament: Banffshire and Buchan Coast

Gardenstown is a small coastal village, 8.7 miles (14.0 km) by road east of Banff in Aberdeenshire, northeastern Scotland. It lies in the civil parish of Gamrie, formerly part of Banffshire.

The village's main economic base is fishing. Gardenstown is served by Gardenstown New Church. The hamlet of Dubford is to the south, and a footpath along the shore to the east leads to the village of Crovie.

== History ==
There is evidence of Neolithic or Bronze Age peoples having settled in the vicinity of Gardenstown; notably at Longman Hill and Cairn Lee. Nearby are the remains of the Church of St John the Evangelist which was built in 1513, and celebrates the defeat of the Danes at this site in 1004 in the Battle of the Bloody Pits.

Gardenstown and its harbour were founded in 1720 by Alexander Garden. Fishing began in 1812. Two substantial stone-built piers enclosing a triangular basin were reconstructed in 1868. A four-storey rubble net store stands nearby.

In April 1913 work was started on an improvement scheme for the harbour which envisaged the extension of the east pier and the construction of a new basin to the west of the existing basin, enclosed by a new breakwater. However the concrete work on the breakwater was defective and in July 1913 the contractors were ordered to stop. The work was taken out of the contractors' hands and the extension of the east pier was given priority. In 1915 it was decided to remove the defective concrete work of the new west pier and work on the new basin was deferred. Work on the east pier continued. By 1916 the east pier was practically complete.

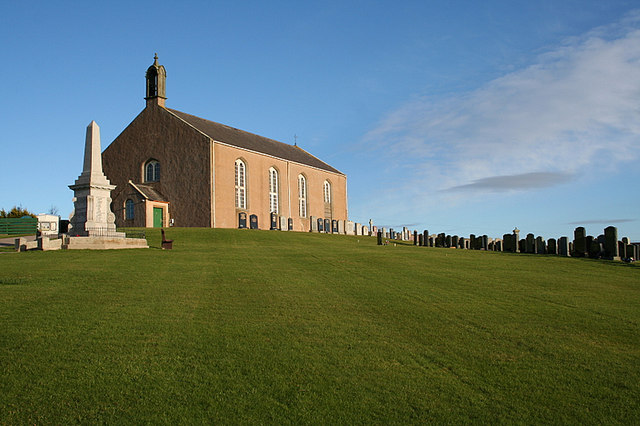
Gamrie Parish Church, built in 1830

A church was built in 1830, the work of William Robertson, replacing the old church of St John, and the parish of Gardenstown was separated from Gamrie on 16 March 1885. In 1953, heavy flooding washed away two houses in the village. Greenskairs House dates to 1846, the work of A & W Reid.

The Annual Reports of the Fishery Board for Scotland provide an insight into the fishing from Crovie and Gardenstown in the years before the First World War. The report for 1900 states that "these two creeks are mostly confined to line fishing. The herring boats go to Shetland and Fraserburgh, those fishing at the latter place occasionally landing a shot at Gardenstown." In 1912 it is reported that "line fishing [is] chiefly prosecuted at these creeks. There is a decrease in quantity and value. Three steam drifters added to the fleet."

Fishery Statistics

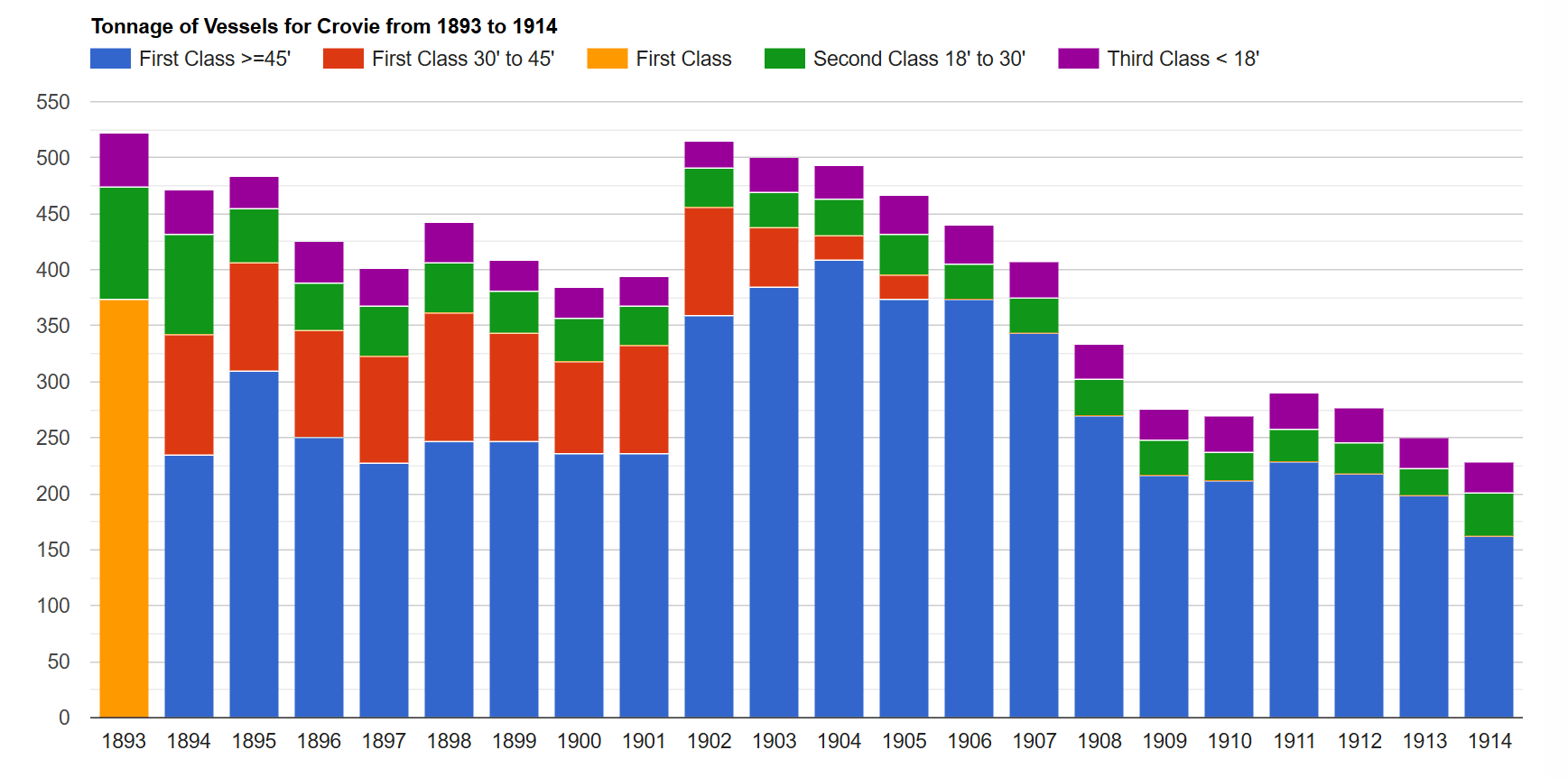
Crovie tonnage of vessels

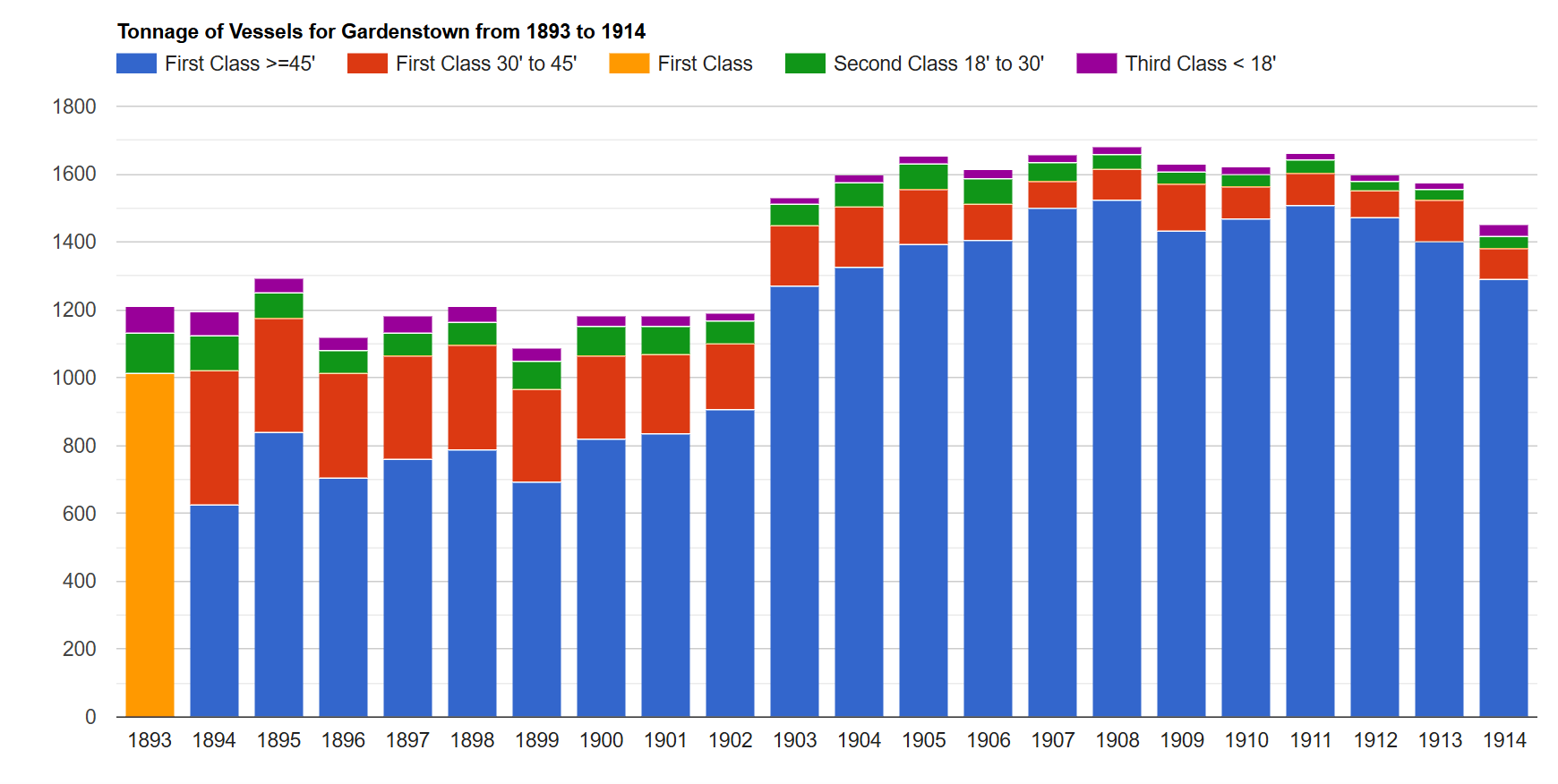
Gardenstown tonnage of vessels

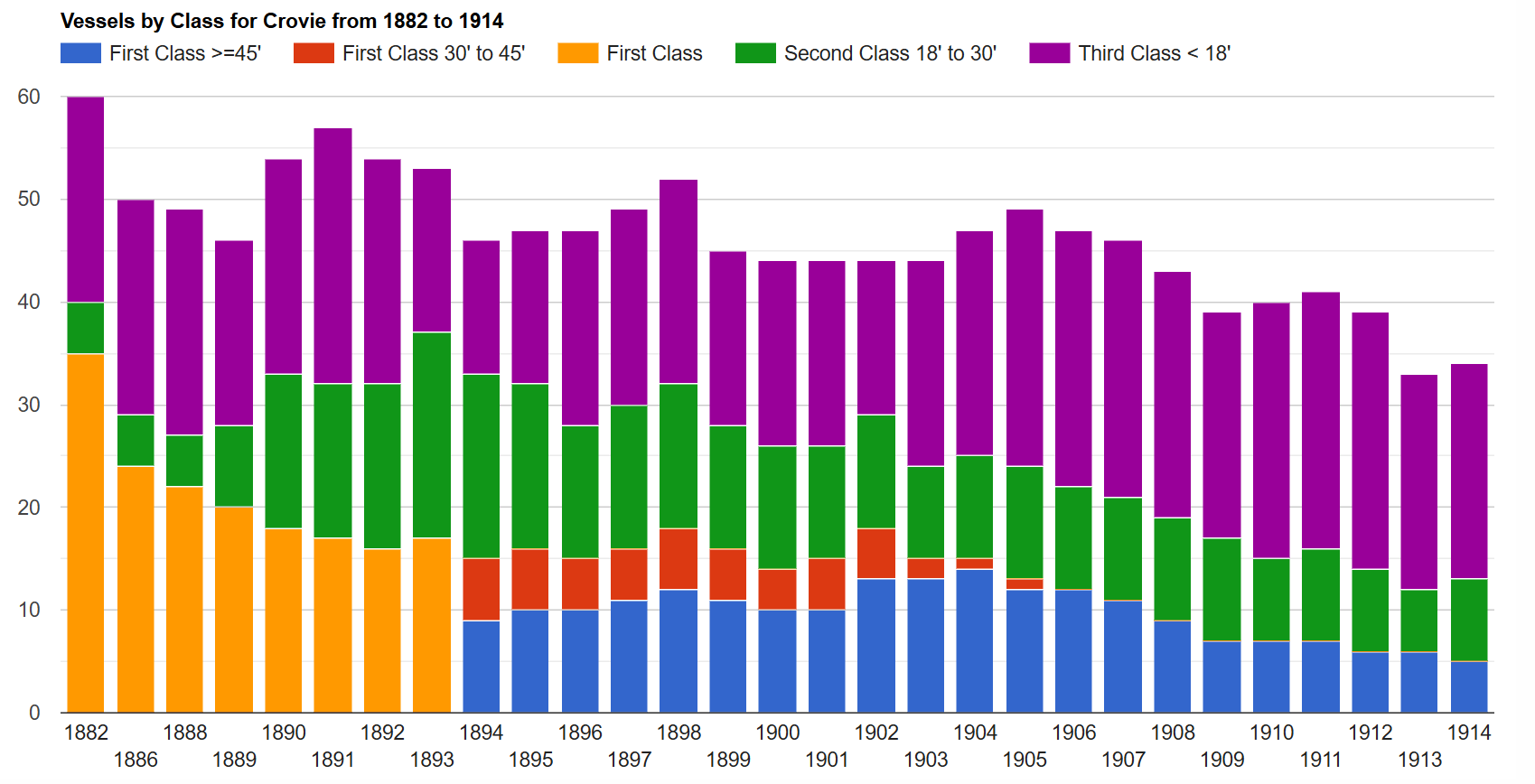
Crovie vessels by class

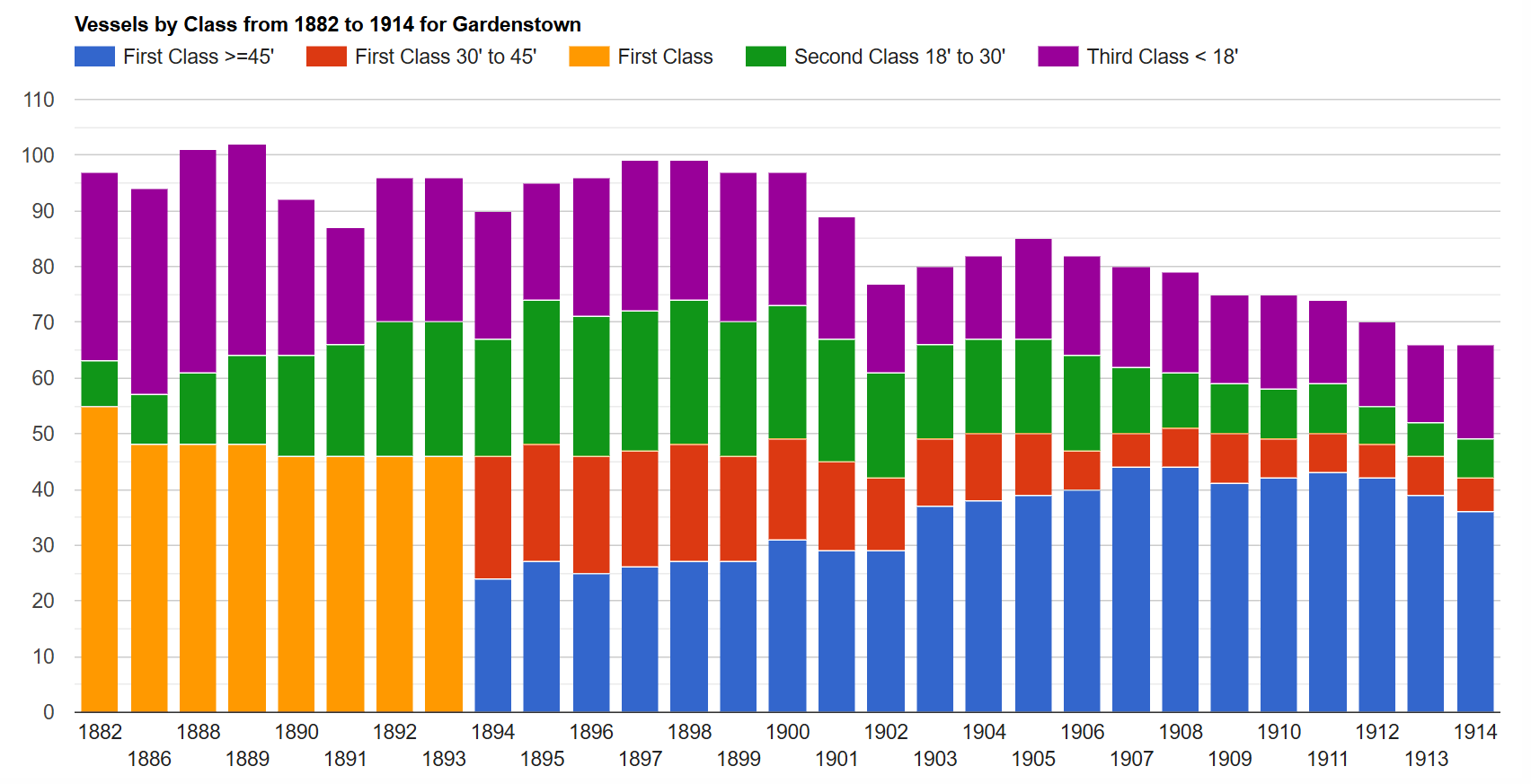
Gardenstown vessels by class

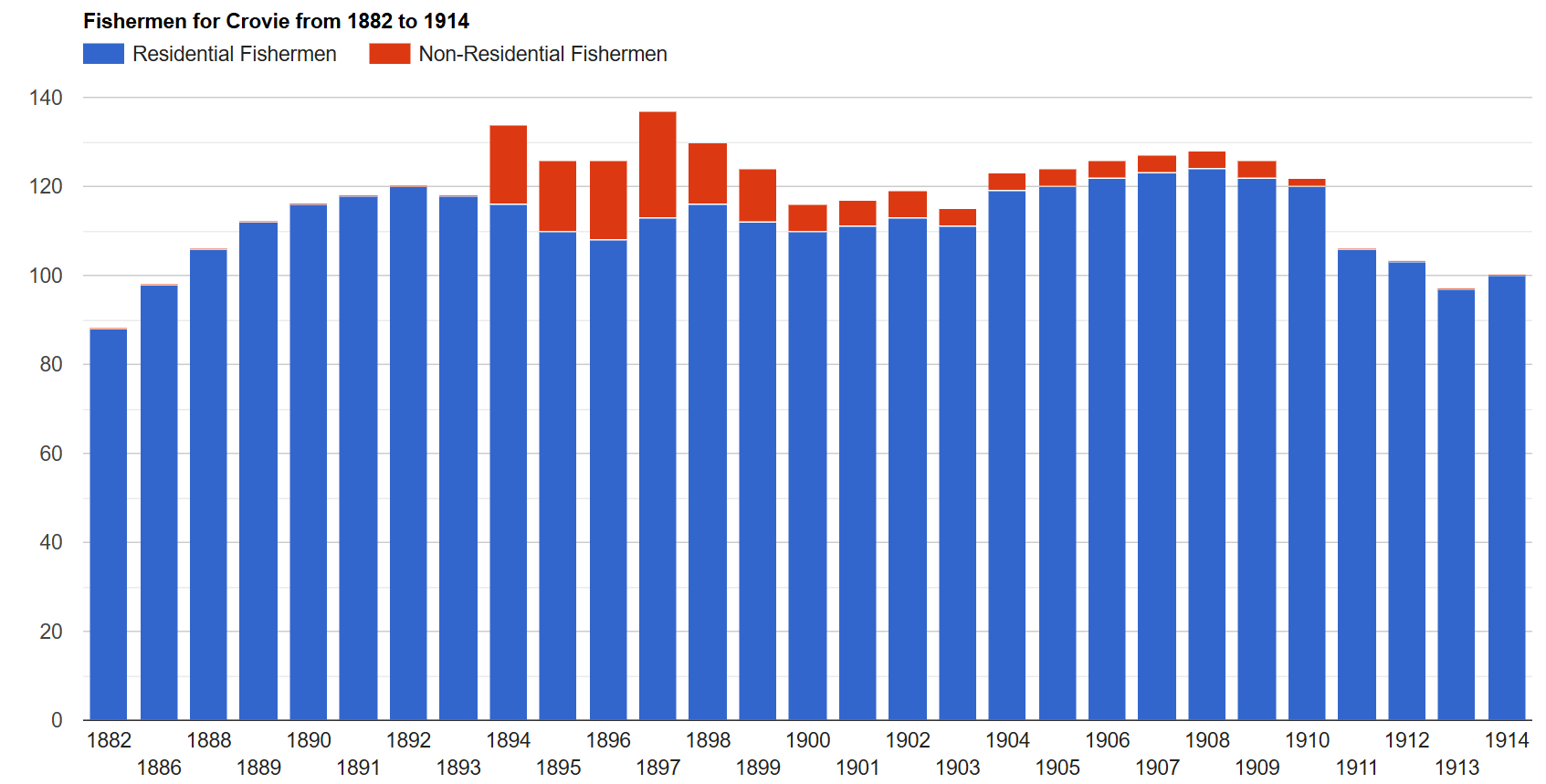
Crovie fishermen

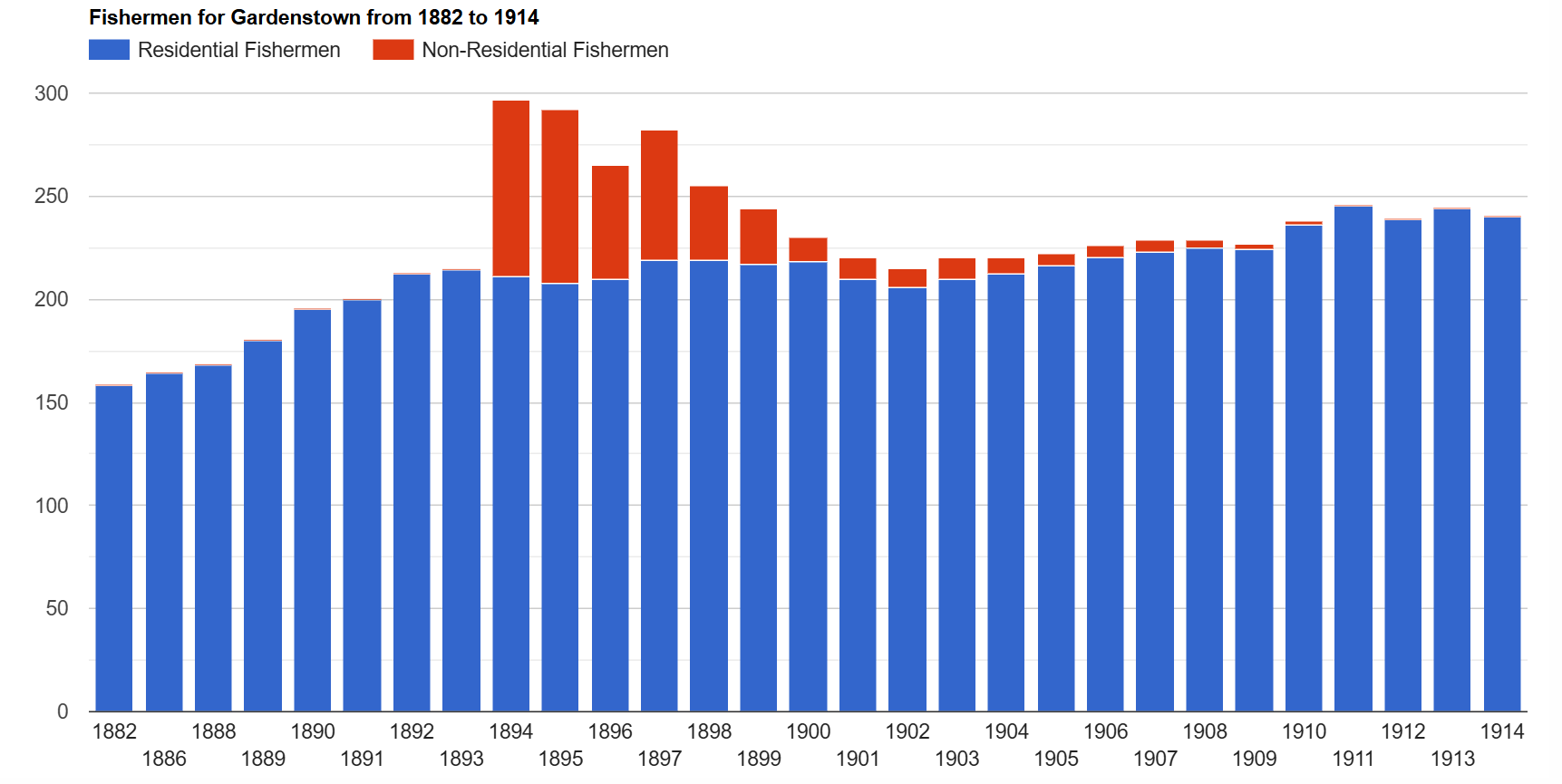
Gardenstown fishermen

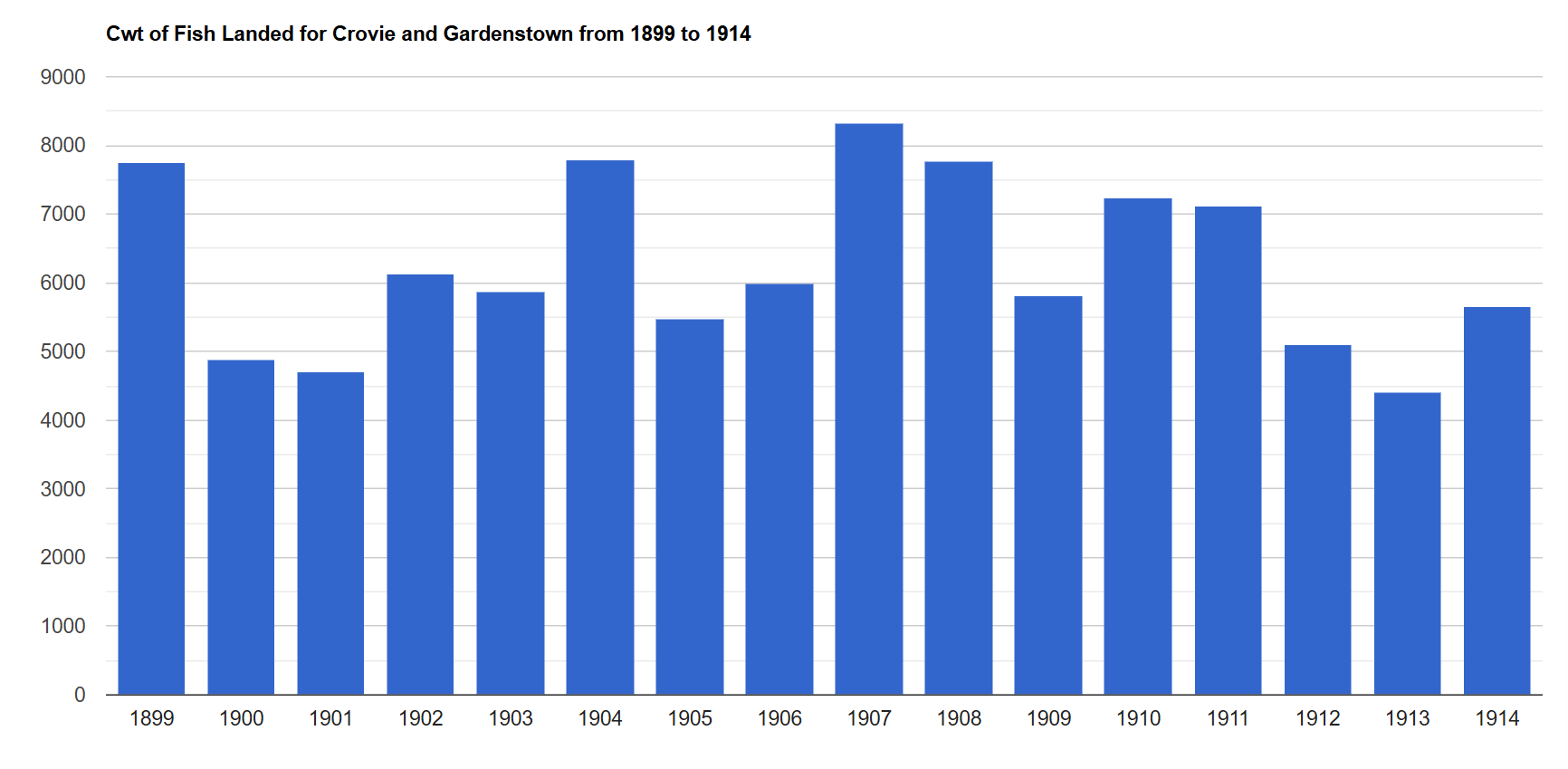
Cwt of fish landed

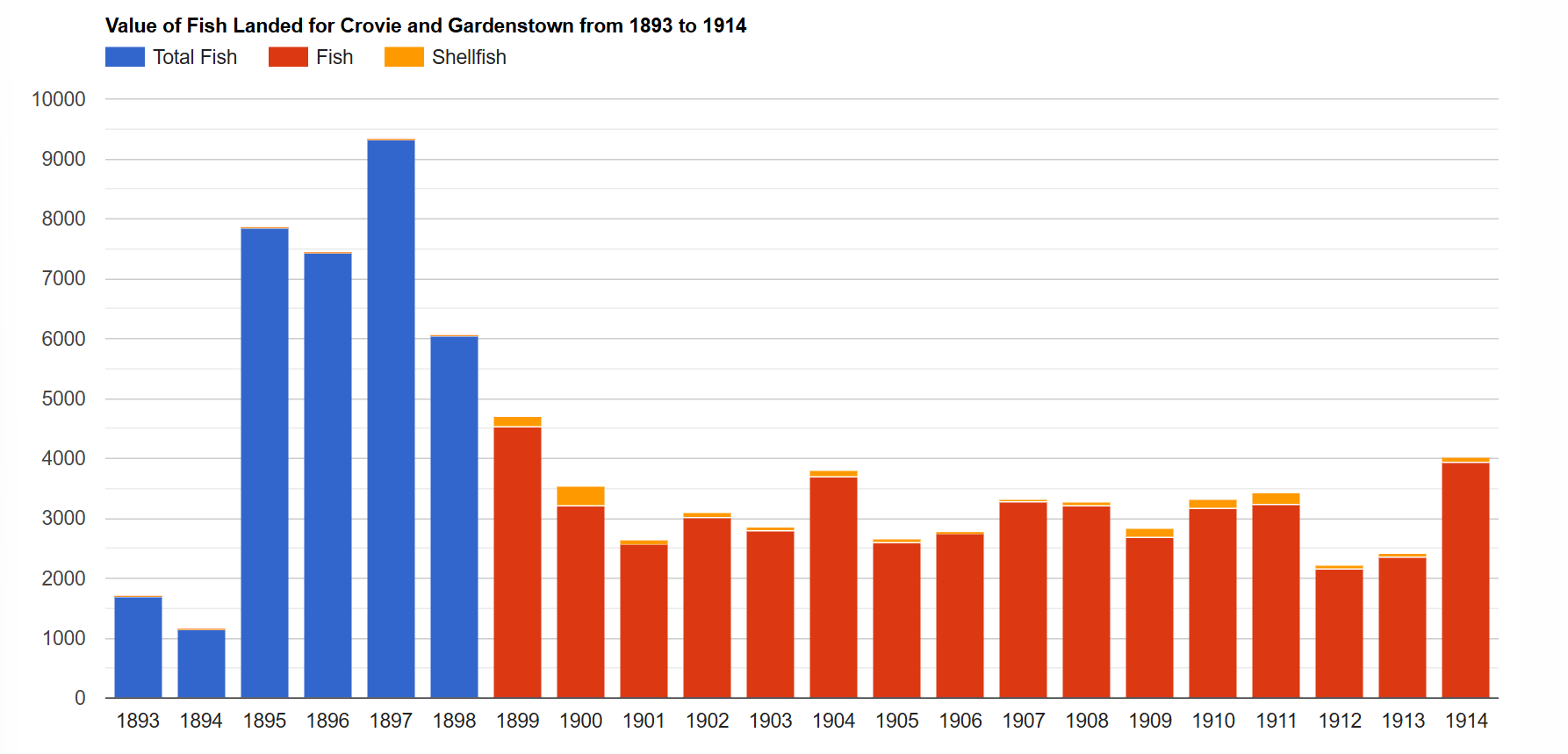
Value (£) of fish landed

In May 2007, a TV series titled The Baron was filmed in and around the village. The series featured three celebrities — Malcolm McLaren, Mike Reid and Suzanne Shaw — competing to be elected "Baron of Troup". During the filming, McLaren was thrown out of the village for unruly behaviour, leaving Reid and Shaw to contest the final election, which was won by Reid.

Between 2008 and 2010, an ethnographic study of the social, religious and economic life of the village was conducted by anthropologist Joseph Webster. This was published by Palgrave in 2013 as a book entitled The Anthropology of Protestantism: Faith and Crisis among Scottish Fishermen.

In January and February 2008, the village again made headlines when Aberdeenshire Council refused funding to restore the road which runs along the seafront and is a key part of the village's sea defences. The refusal was based upon the status of the road as a private road, thus not the responsibility of the council. This has been seen as controversial since the road runs along the top of the seawall, and the council is responsible for the wall. Residents expressed grave concern that their houses might be washed away and appealed.

== Landmarks and local economy ==
The village's main economic base is fishing. A permanent meteorological station is situated at Gardenstown. The village is served by Gardenstown New Church and has a pub, an osteopathy clinic and a whale and dolphin rescue centre. Until recently there was a bakery and a butcher's shop.

== Notable people ==
- Joseph Watt (1887–1955), recipient of the Victoria Cross

== See also ==
- B9031 Road
