= Flag of Banffshire =

Historic Scottish county flag

Banffshire
- Proportion: 3:5
- Adopted: 28 October 2023
- Designed by: Ellie Stewart

The Banffshire flag is the flag of the Scottish county of Banff, registered with the Flag Institute on 28 October 2023.

== History ==
On 24 January 2023 the Banffshire Lieutenancy announced a competition designed to secure a flag for the county. The competition launched on 27 February and ran for four weeks, alongside a similar competition in neighbouring Moray, with both closing on 24 March. The competition’s 424 submissions were shortlisted to four finalists by a judging panel at the end of April, for inclusion in a public vote starting 27 June and closing on 8 August. The winning design's creator raised the flag at an official launch ceremony on 28 October at Castle Hill in Cullen.

== Design ==
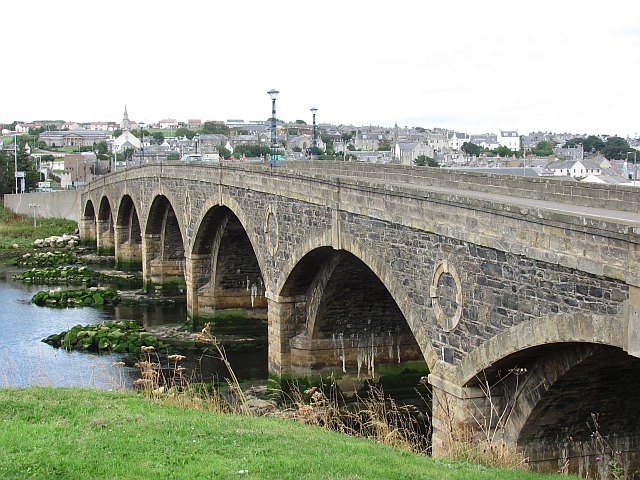
Banff Bridge

The blue represents the many rivers in the county, along with the sea which washes the north of Banffshire. Arching over the blue, the design represents the iconic bridges of the county. The golden yellow symbolises both harvest and whisky. The sun is, in the words of the Lord Lieutenant, "a reminder of the glorious sunsets and nature that we can enjoy".

The Pantone colours for the flag are:

Scheme	Yellow	White	Blue
Pantone (Paper)	1375 C	White	286 C
Web colours	#FF9E1B	#FFFFFF	#0033A0
RGB	255, 158, 27	255, 255, 255	0, 51, 160
CMYK	0%, 38%, 89%, 0%	0%, 0%, 0%, 0%	100%, 68%, 0%, 37%

== Contenders ==
Design A

The blue boar's head in the canton is a reference to the possible origin of the name of Banffshire (thought to be derived from the Scottish Gaelic word banbh meaning "piglet"). Additionally, it can also evoke the Deskford carnyx, discovered in the county in 1816. Furthermore, three blue boar's heads appeared on the arms of the former Banffshire County Council. The checkered gold and black field (together with the blue of the boar) references the main colours of the official Shades of Banffshire tartan. The gold from the tartan symbolises the county's farming and whisky industries, while the black represents the Aberdeen Angus cattle breed, originally bred and registered in Banff.

Design B

The orange half represents the whisky industry of mainland Banffshire, while the blue half symbolises the fishing industries off the county's coast. The flag's diagonal orientation evokes the shape of Banffshire, which stretches in a south-westerly to north-easterly direction. The barrel emblem in the centre recalls the barrels used for maturing whiskies, as well as the barrels used for storing fish.

Design C

The flower in the centre is a dark red helleborine, which was chosen as the official county flower in 2002, to mark the Golden Jubilee of Queen Elizabeth II. The diagonal white line evokes the diagonal orientation of Banffshire, while the two blue lines on either side stand for the two major rivers that help to mark the county's boundaries; the River Spey and the River Deveron.

Design D

The winning design.
