= B9031 road =

Road in Scotland

The B9031 Road is a paved public highway in northern Aberdeenshire, Scotland. The roadway is notable for its proximity and access to a number of scenic, historic and prehistoric sites. for example the road provides access to the historic St. Drostan's Kirk. The road also provides proximity access to the prehistoric sites of Cairn Lee and Longman Hill.

== See also ==
- Burn of Myrehouse
- Cairn Lee
