= Francis George Cumming =

New Zealand salvation army officer, chaplain and social worker (1861–1941)

Francis George Cumming (18 November 1861 – 18 October 1941) was a New Zealand The Salvation Army officer, chaplain, social worker and probation officer. He was born in Marnoch, Banffshire, Scotland on 18 November 1861.
