= Castle of Findon =

Former Scottish castle

- Aberdeenshire, Scotland

Location
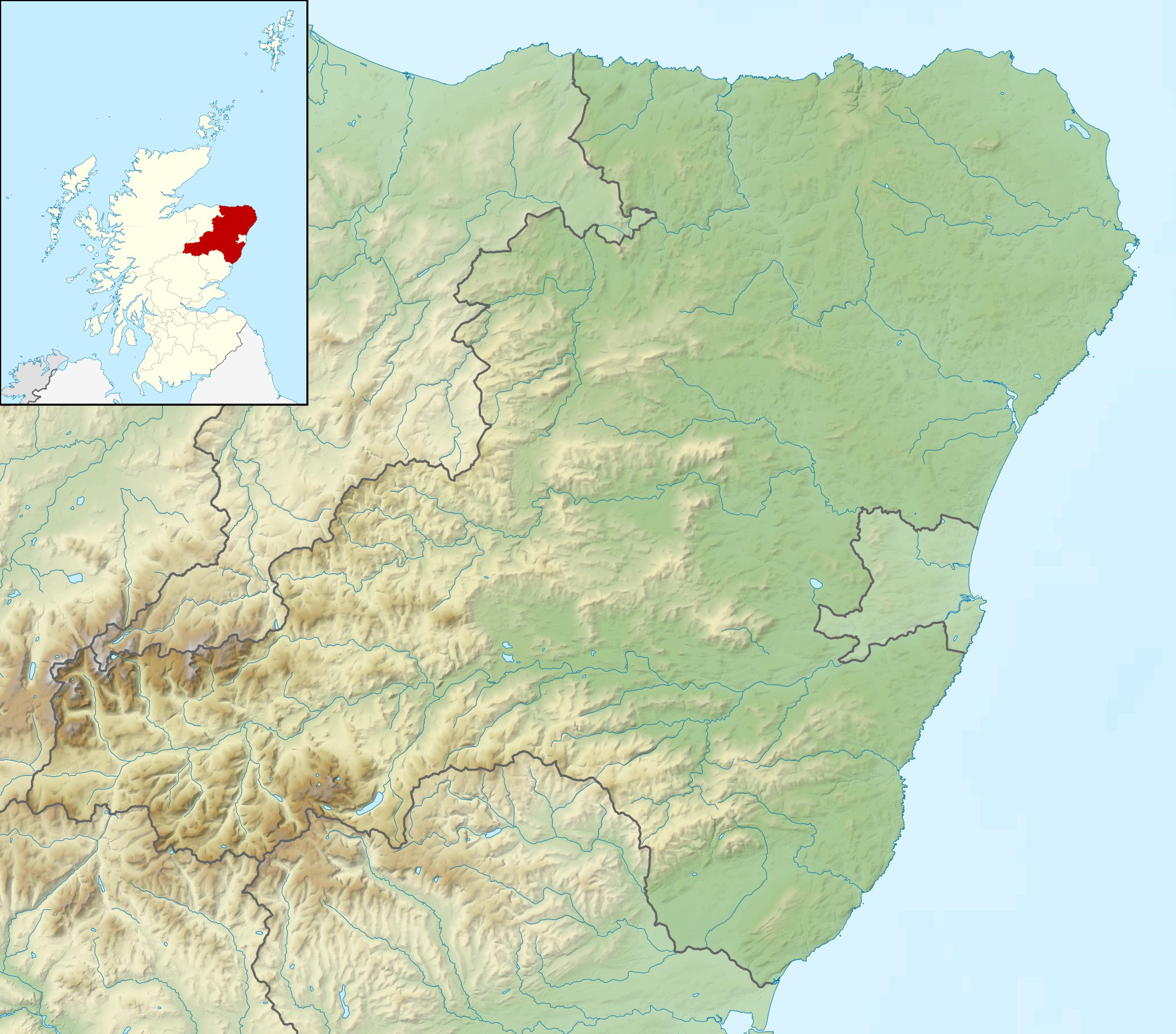
- Castle of Findon
- Coordinates: 57.66745658°N 2.345346523°W

Castle of Findon (Note: Also known as Findon Castle) was a castle located in Aberdeenshire, Scotland.

Located overlooking Gamrie Bay, are the earth mound remains of the castle. The castle was constructed upon a hillfort, that had been constructed to defend the area from Viking raids. The castle was held by the Troup family in the 14th century and passed to the Gardyne family.
