= Cullykhan Castle =

Former Scottish castle

- Aberdeenshire, Scotland

Location
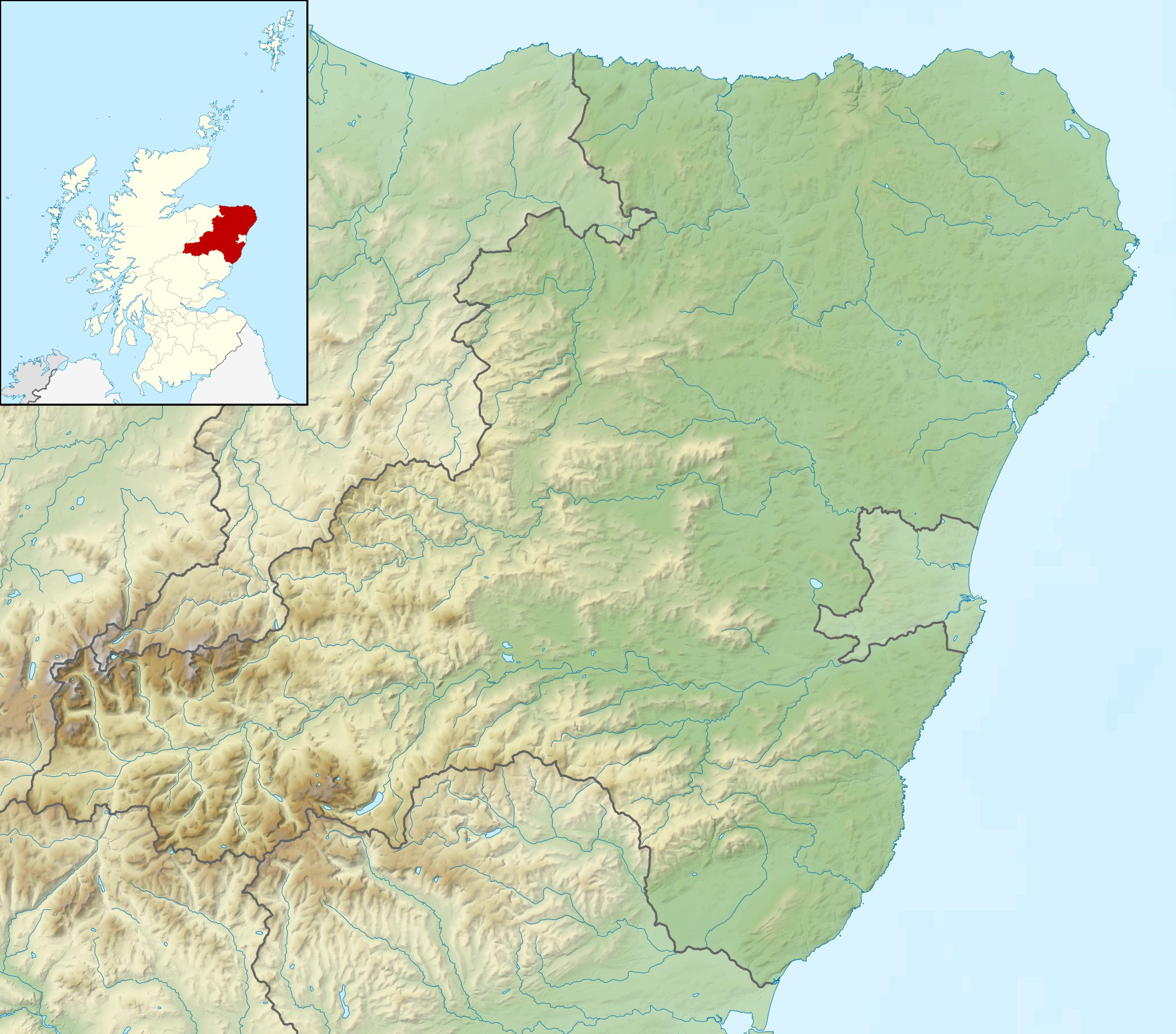
- Cullykhan Castle
- Coordinates: 57.68559923°N 2.273395885°W

Cullykhan Castle was a castle located in Aberdeenshire, Scotland.

Located overlooking Cullykhan Bay, are the earth mound remains of the castle. The castle was constructed upon a hillfort, that had been constructed to defend the area from Viking raids. The castle was held by the Troup family in the 14th century.
