= Burn of Myrehouse =

Stream in Aberdeenshire, Scotland

Location
- Country: Scotland

Physical characteristics
- Mouth: Banff Bay (North Sea)
  - coordinates: 57.6584°N 2.48008°W

The Burn of Myrehouse is a coastal stream in Aberdeenshire in northeast Scotland, the lower section of which, Getty Burn is a right bank tributary of River Deveron which discharges into Banff Bay. This watercourse has been suggested as an associated feature to the prehistoric feature at nearby Longman Hill.

== See also ==
- Macduff, Aberdeenshire
