= Cairn Lee =

Prehistoric monument in Scotland

Coordinates: 57°39′18″N 2°25′1″W

Cairn Lee is a prehistoric monument in Aberdeenshire, Scotland. Cairn Lee and proximate Longman Hill are the oldest prehistoric features in the local area.

== See also ==
- B9031 Road
- Dubford
- Gardenstown
