= Crovie =

Coordinates: 57.6780493°N 2.3251892°W

Crovie: Scottish Gaelic: Craobhaidh
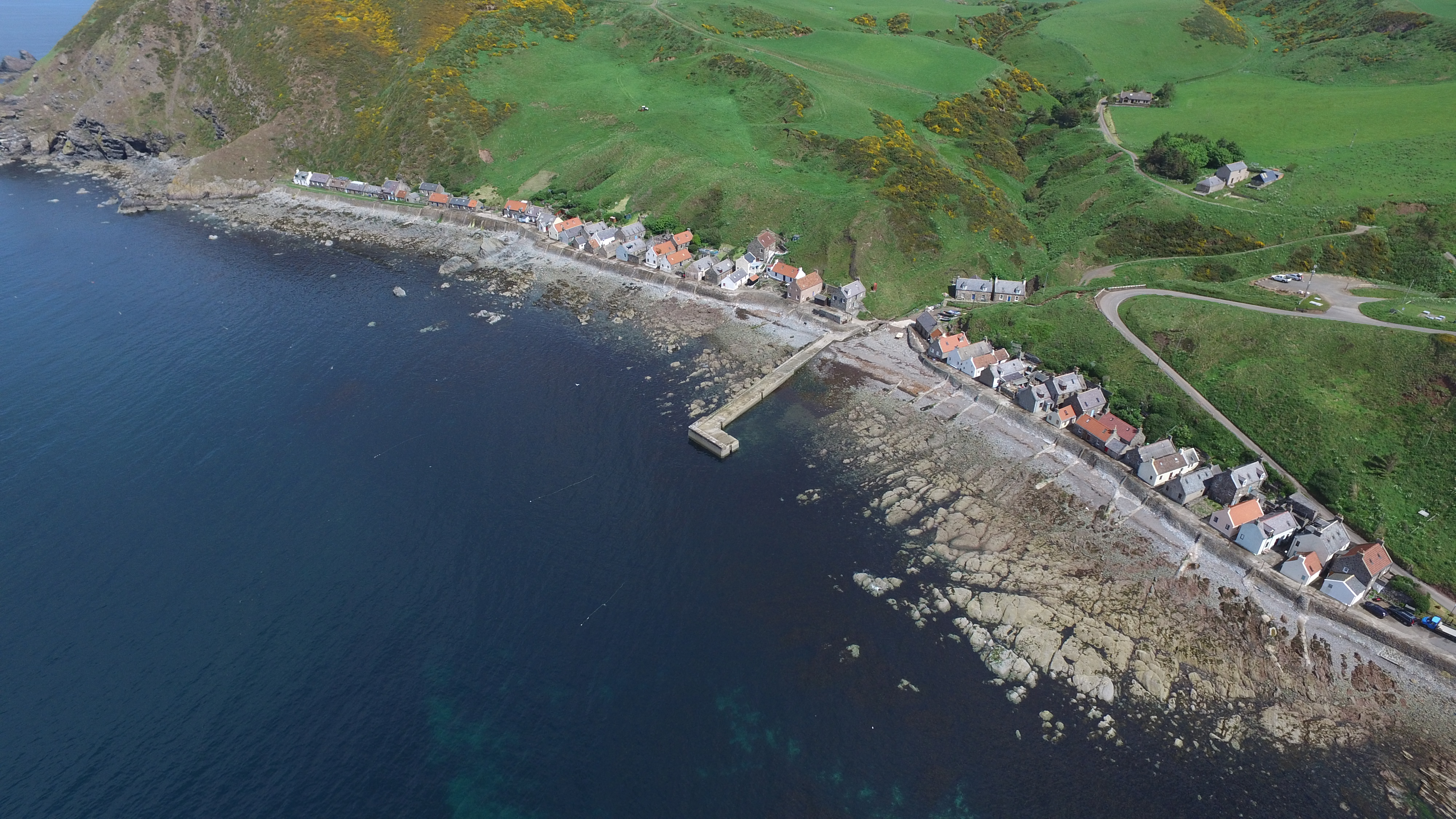

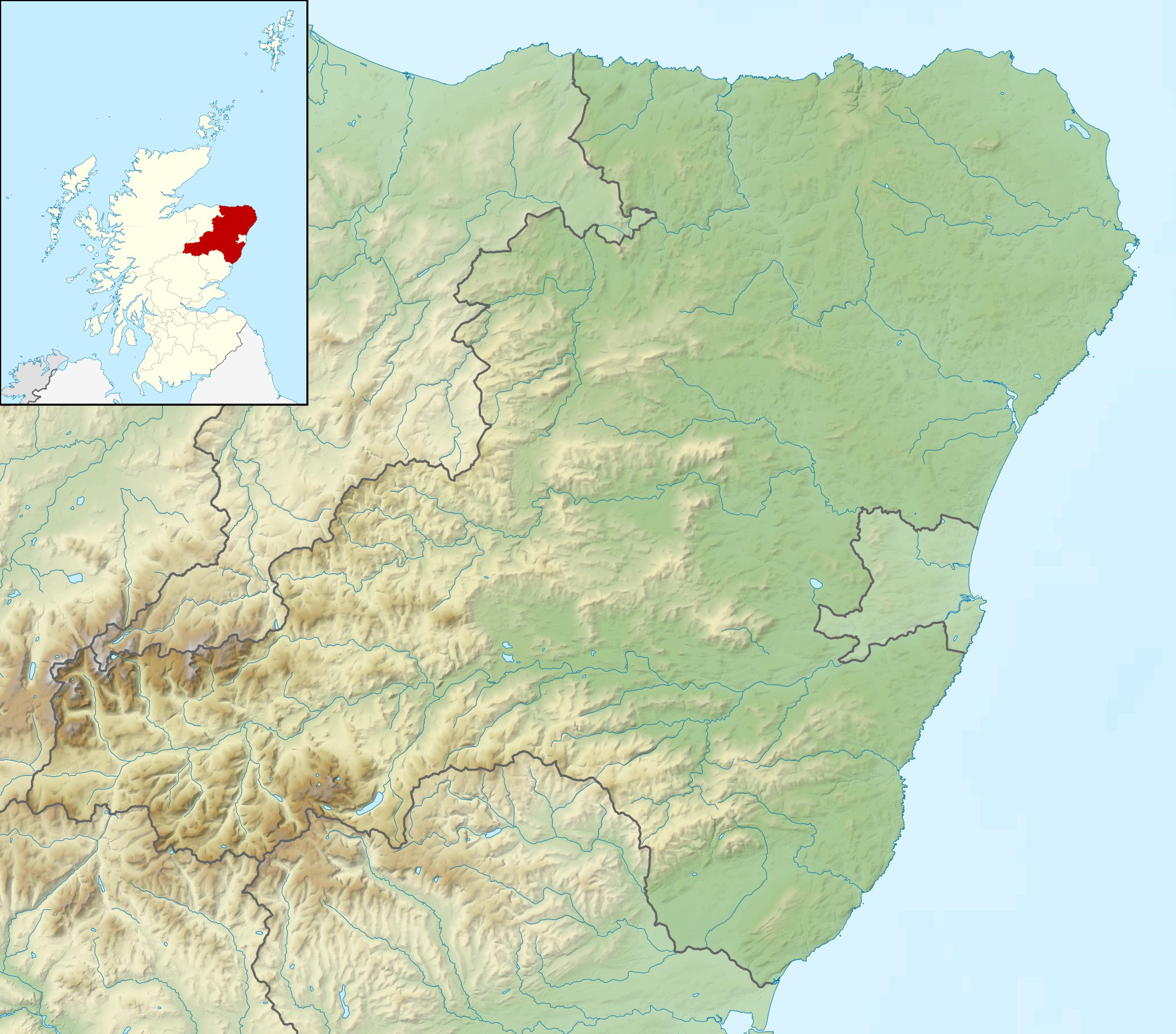
- Location within Aberdeenshire
- Council area: Aberdeenshire
- Lieutenancy area: Aberdeenshire
- Country: Scotland
- Sovereign state: United Kingdom
- Post town: BANFF
- Postcode district: AB45
- Dialling code: 01261
- Police: Scotland
- Fire: Scottish
- Ambulance: Scottish
- UK Parliament: Aberdeenshire North and Moray East
- Scottish Parliament: Banffshire and Buchan Coast

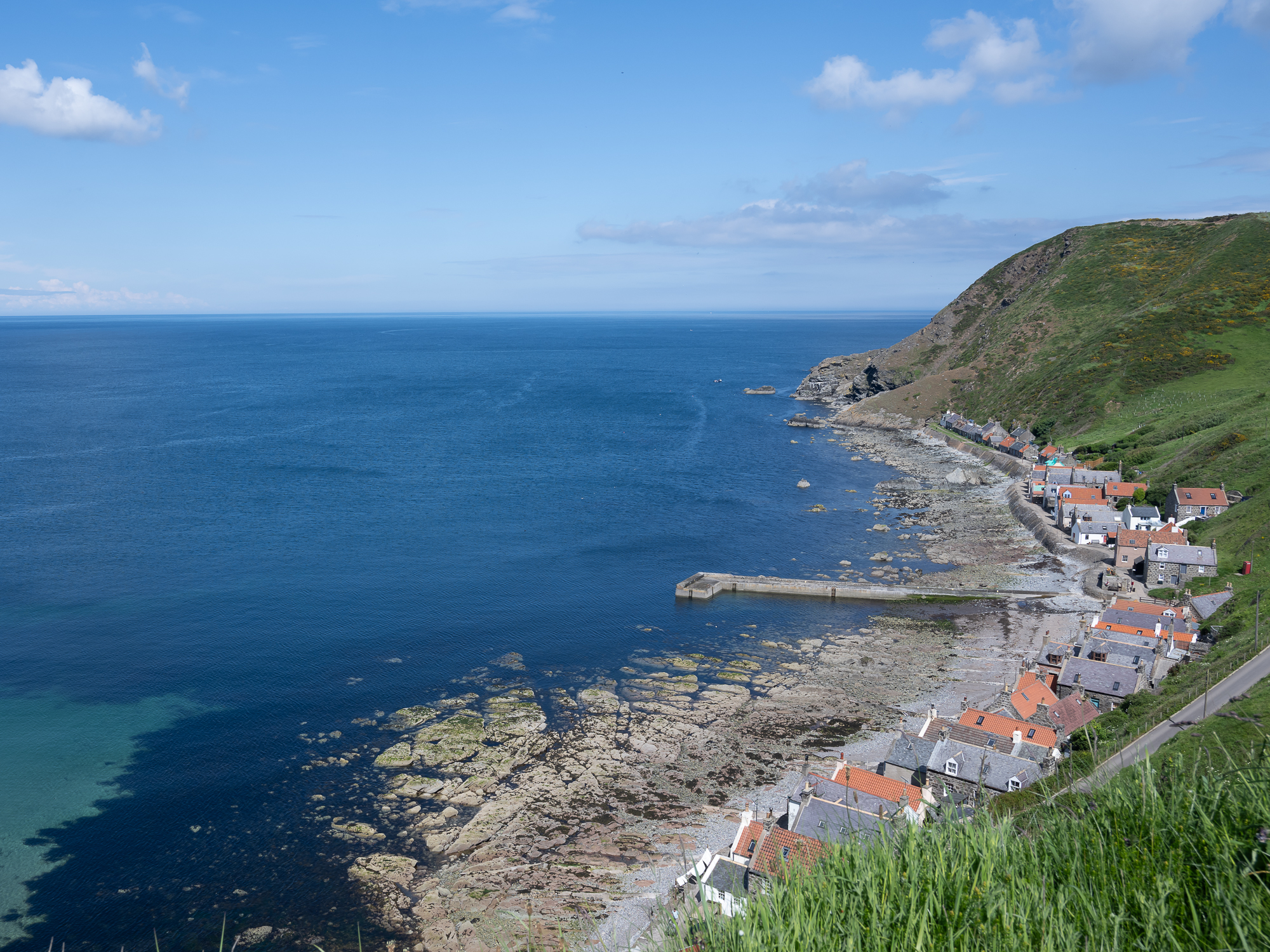
Crovie

Crovie /ˈkrɪvi/ is a small village in Aberdeenshire, Scotland, dating from the 18th century, a time when the sea was the only mode of transport to and from Scotland's shores. The smallest and most remote of Buchan cliff-foot fishing villages, it comprises a single row of houses, most gable-end to the sea. (Number 9 has Peter Johnstone, 1789 cut into it.)

Unlike the similar neighbouring village of Pennan, Crovie is situated on such a narrow ledge that any cars have to be left at the south of the village. A footpath along the shore to the west leads to neighbouring village Gardenstown.

== History ==
Crovie was established by families (crofters) who had been moved off the land to make room for the landowners' sheep. Here, they operated fishing boats for the local landlord and gradually acquired their own craft instead. The fishing industry declined in the 20th century before ceasing altogether with the storm of 1953, which washed away a number of structures and forced the residents to flee. Since then most of the buildings have been turned into holiday lets.

== Troup Head ==
Described by Charles McKean as having "one of the finest viewpoints in Scotland," Troup Head is a large landmark of red sandstone that rises to 365 feet (111 m). It is a popular location for ornithology. In the mid-19th century it was recommended that bird-watchers should make a pilgrimage to the cliffs to see large numbers of kittiwake (locally Kitty), razor-bill auk (Coutter), guillemot (Queet) and puffin (Tammy Norie). Northern gannets began a colony at Troup Head in 1988, and by 2014 it held an estimated 6,456 pairs.
