= Longman Hill =

Hill in Aberdeenshire, Scotland

Coordinates: 57.6474°N 2.4407°W

- The barrow on skyline at right, in 2007
- Interactive map of Longman Hill
- Type: Long barrow
- Periods: Neolithic
- Location: Near Macduff, Aberdeenshire, Scotland

Scheduled monument
- Official name: Longman Cairn, long barrow, Longman Hill
- Type: Prehistoric ritual and funerary: long barrow; mound (ritual or funerary rather than defensive or domestic)
- Designated: 1924
- Reference no.: SM341

Longmanhill is a Neolithic long barrow situated atop a hill south-east of Macduff in northern Aberdeenshire, Scotland. It has been slightly damaged by quarrying on the north side. From the barrow it is possible to see Bennachie and Ben Rinnes.

In 1868, a burial urn was found which contained bones; it was accidentally destroyed. A second urn was found two years later. In 1925, the monument was recorded as being 220 feet (67 m) long in total, with a barrow 150 feet (46 m) long and a cairn 70 feet (21 m) in diameter. Stuart Piggott considered Longman Hill to be one of four Scottish barrows to have links to the Windmill Hill culture of southern Britain.

== See also ==
- Cairn Lee
- Catto Long Barrow
