= William Dove Paterson =

Pioneer of Cinema in Aberdeen

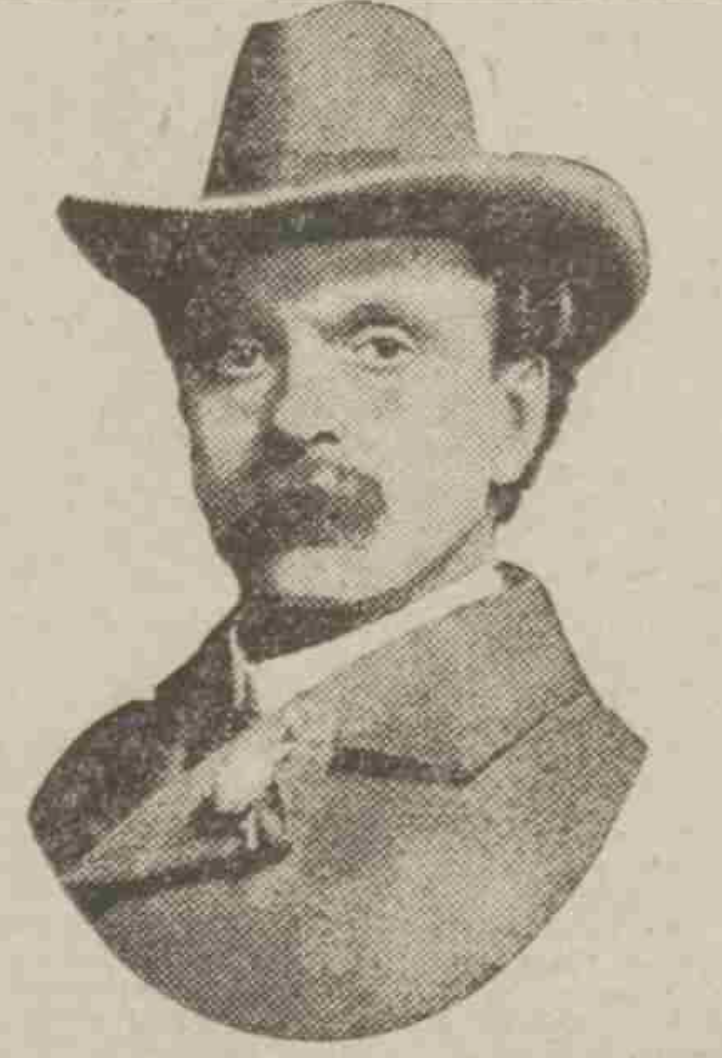
- William Dove Paterson from his obituary in Aberdeen Weekly Journal - Friday 23 June 1916
- Born: 25 February 1860; Newburgh, Aberdeenshire
- Died: 16 June 1916 (aged 56); Royal Infirmary, Aberdeen
- Resting place: Springbank Cemetery, Aberdeen
- Occupation: Cinematograph Proprietor

William Dove Paterson (born William Paterson; 25 February 1860 – 16 June 1916), also known as Dove Paterson, was a pioneer of cinema in Aberdeen, Scotland.

== Early life ==
Paterson was born in Newburgh in the parish of Foveran, Aberdeenshire on 25 February 1860. His parents were Joseph Paterson, an agricultural labourer, and Mary Paterson née Crighton. His name is recorded as William Paterson with no middle name, with the name Dove adopted later.

== Career ==
Paterson was for many years a salesman with Morrison's Economic Stores, and later was an elocutionist and photographer. In an Aberdeen Directory of 1882 he was teaching elocution in a studio at No.1, Black's Buildings, near to Schoolhill. He appeared at the Music Hall on 2 October 1897 in aid of the Powis Clock Fund on a bill which included Scott Skinner. On 2 May 1898 Dove Paterson and Robert Calder presented the first Cinematograph Carnival in the Music Hall. On 1 January 1900 Paterson was one of the organisers of New Year Festival celebrating the new century at the Music Hall, under the auspices of the Aberdeen Temperance Society, which included cinematograph work by Lizars. In September 1901 he rented the Music Hall for an entire week to present "Madame Llloyd's Grand Music and Scenic Company" a variety show of music, dancing, tableau vivants, dioramas and cinematographs. By 1901 he styled himself as "Elocutionist and Cinematographer". The term elocutionist, in this context refers to one or more persons, with megaphones narrating or voicing characters as the film is played.

"...may I say that it was Dove Paterson and his good lady who had 'talking' pictures first in Aberdeen? And real talking —not canned! They had the St Katherine's Hall. Shiprow. and used advertise 'The House of Talking Pictures.' They studied the synopsis of the picture and ran it through in the forenoon; then both Dove and his wife stood behind the screen and told the story. and also tried to portray the characters. They also had a machine for sound effects almost everything you could mention. Turn a handle—roaring sea, horse trotting, thunder, drums. etc. Many a time I have been behind the screen and had a turn and sometimes turned the handle of a thunder effect when it should have been the sea washing up on the rocks!"

On 14 October 1907 John Sinclair, and animal trainer opened the Winter Zoo in Guild Street, Aberdeen. Of the many attractions, including a lion and lioness, were quarter-hourly cinematographic shows by Dove Paterson. Paterson wrote an article for the trade paper Kinematogaph and Lantern Weekly issue on 2 July 1908, "How I Handle Pictures". In it he states:

"I insist on the sobriety of my whole staff. I have been a life-long abstainer, and Lady Nicotine claims none of my affections, and it is simply by adherance [sic] to those (some would think minor) details that I have been able to handle the pictures so successfully, and retain the favour and confidence of the public so far."

Paterson had given "a dramatic recital to the weekly meeting of the Abstainers' Union" in 1889.

He also stated that he had toured the United States and Canada in 1892–1893 as an elocutionist and concert promoter with the Royal Edinburgh Concert Company. "..perhaps then I absorbed the hustling propensities of the Yankee - which are very useful in making my shows a success at the present time."

Paterson was an inventor too, designing, refining and patenting several pieces of projector equipment. On 5 September 1908 Paterson opened Aberdeen's first permanent cinema, The Gaiety, in the former Saint Katherine's Hall on Shiprow, between Union Street and Provost Ross's House. The latter now forms part of the Aberdeen Maritime Museum.

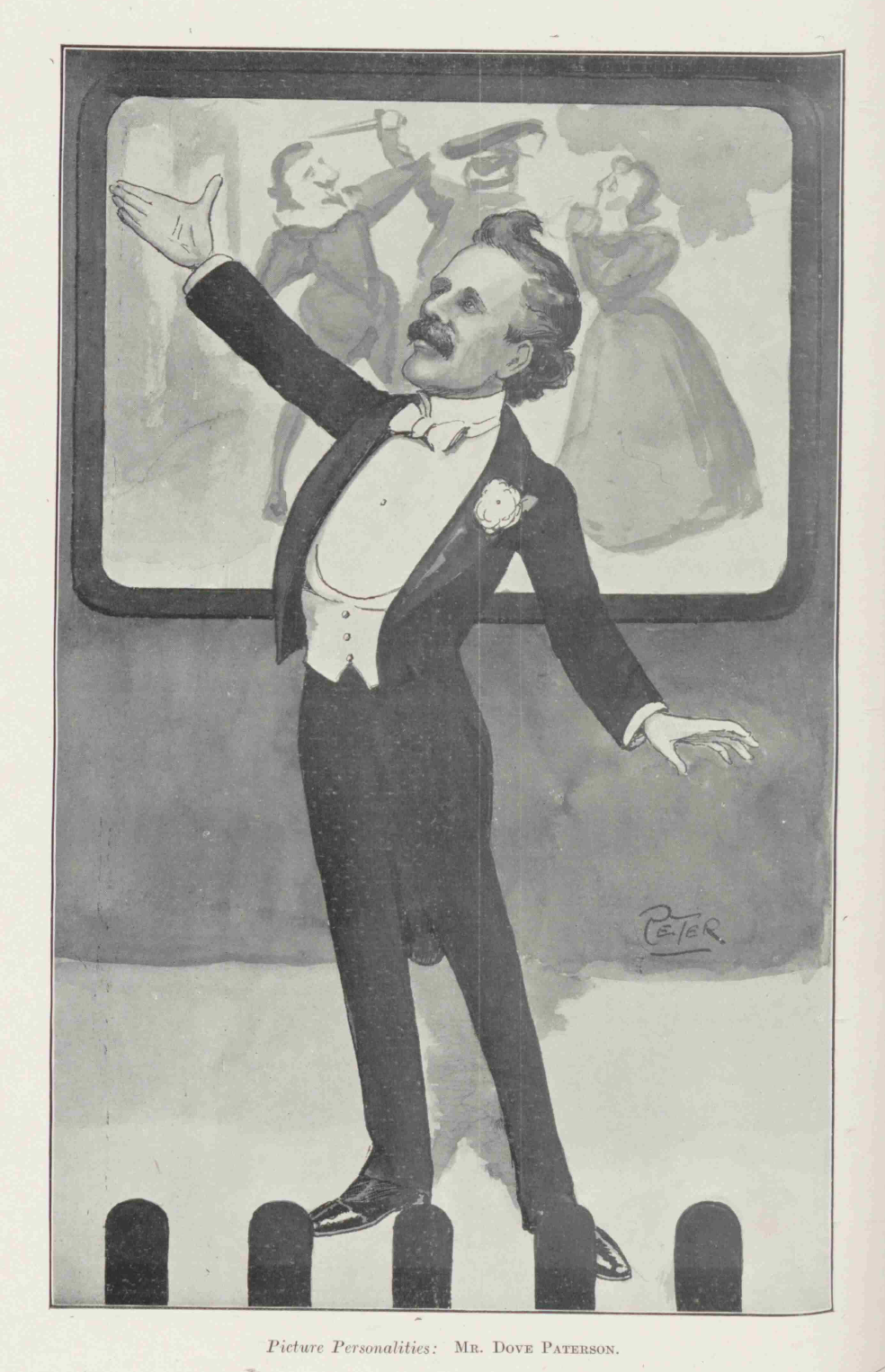
Cartoon of Dove Paterson from The Bioscope Magazine 17 April 1913

In 1909 Paterson gave a "bioscope exhibition to prisoners in Craiginches Prison"

In 1910 The Torry Skating Rink Syndicate opened its Sinclair Road premises as The Torry Picture Palace with films syndicated from Dove Paterson's Aberdeen Cinematic Bureau. That same year, Paterson opened his how film theatre, the Beach Bijou, on the sea front, a little south of the Bathing Station. It was constructed of wood and canvas and seated an audience of 200. Tickets were 1d for children and 2d for adults.

In late 1911 and 1912 the Music Hall was running Saturday Night Cinema Concerts with cinematographs by Dove Paterson. When other bookings took precedence these concerts would be transferred to either the Albert Hall, Huntly Street or the YMCA on Union Street. By September 1912 Paterson was running cinematograph concerts on Wednesday nights at the Music Hall with "smartly-dressed girls as chocolate sellers."

By summer 1913 the lease taken by J J Bennell on the Coliseum (now The Belmont Cinema), was coming to an end. Paterson, was ready to take it, having had an ambition to operate his own city centre cinema. He and his wife took over on 11 August 1913. Paterson took his camera to the Braemar Gathering of 1913. The film he made led to his giving a royal command performance at Mar Lodge for the Princess Royal on 17 September 1913.

In late 1913 a film had been made of The Turra Coo, a cow which had been seized for auction in lieu of unpaid National Insurance by a farmer in Turriff. The film was shown at both The Gaiety and Coliseum cinemas in Aberdeen in February 1914. Paterson "took the film to Turriff for a special show in aid of the Parish Church renovation scheme, and to the Victoria Hall, Ellon, where great cheers and applause greeted the appearance on screen of several well-known farmers." In a column in March 1944 where "The Rambler" wonders what happened to these and other locally shot films, Paterson's son, John Leo Paterson reports that "his father's films were sold when he died, and there, as far as he is concerned, all trace of them is lost."

Paterson's lease on the Gaiety Theatre, which he had held since 1908, came to an end in 1914. It then lay empty until 14 June 1915.

== Personal life ==
Paterson was twice married. His first marriage took place at 26 Catherine Street, Aberdeen on 7 February 1880 to Hellen Philips Ewen. Both were aged nineteen, and were living at the same address: 18 Jute Street, Aberdeen. Paterson signs as W D Paterson, and his occupation was given as draper's assistant. Their son, John Innes Paterson was born on 16 September 1886 at their home, 7 Cherrybank, Hardgate, Aberdeen. The father's name is once again given as William Donald Paterson, and his occupation is a Draper (Assistant).

Come the 1891 Census, William and Hellen are still at Cherrybank. They have three children listed: a son, "Alfred W.E. Paterson, aged 11; a daughter, Winnifred H. Paterson, aged 10; and a further son, John J.E. Paterson, aged 4."

The entry in the register of marriages for William and Hellen is marked as "Divorce." An entry in the Register of Corrected Entries gives the following "7th November 1894. Decree of Divorce was pronounced by Lord Wellwood, Ordinary, in an action at the instance of William Donald Paterson, Draper, Aberdeen against Ellen Philip Ewan [sic] or Paterson his wife formerly in Aberdeen and now in Edinburgh." The grounds for the divorce are not stated but in the late 19th and most of the 20th century an action of divorce could only be brought at the Court of Session.

Paterson remarried on 21 February 1911 - some seventeen years after his divorce from Helen. His new spouse was Marie Louise Pascoe. He was 49 and she was 35. The service took place at 33 Leslie Road, Woodside, Aberdeen, his then address. He signed as William Dove Paterson and described himself as formerly married and gave his profession as an "Entertainer (Dramatic)", and she described herself 'spinster' and as an "Actress (Dramatic)". Her address is given as "25 Union Street, Aberdeen".

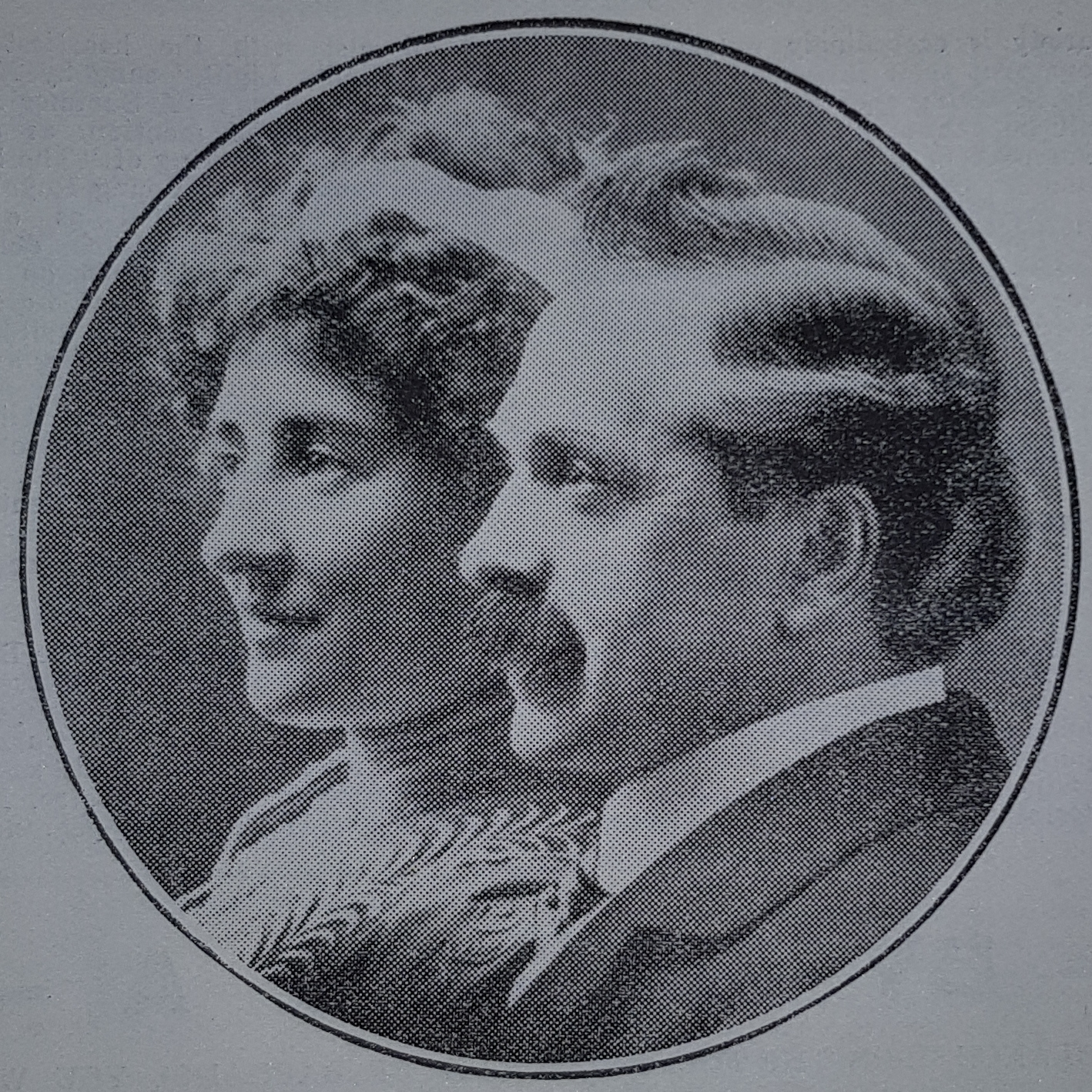
William Dove Paterson and Marie Pascoe 1911

A description of the wedding is given at some length in a piece in that week's edition of Bon Accord Magazine headed "A Pretty Aberdeen Wedding". In addition to noting who attended and a lengthy descriptions of the bride's dress and going-away costume (both by Pratt and Keith) it stated "Among the numerous and valuable presents received by the bride and groom were - From the bridegroom to the bride, a gold watch and chain, two massive gold bangles, and a gold chain pendant, the pendant being in the form of a lyre, which bore a wreath of primroses formed of pearls. From bride to bridegroom, the presents included a complete set of dress jewellery gold with monogram. Mr and Mrs Dove Paterson left Aberdeen by the 1-10 p.m. train for London where a brief honeymoon is to be spent." The following week's Bon Accord Magazine, in its Entertainment column, in an entry for The Gaiety states that "A military episode entitled 'Ransomed, Or A Prisoner of War' tops the Gaiety programme this week.... Mr and Mrs Dove Paterson, fresh from their London Trip, supply the necessary vocal accompaniments in characteristic style'. So, their honeymoon was a short one."

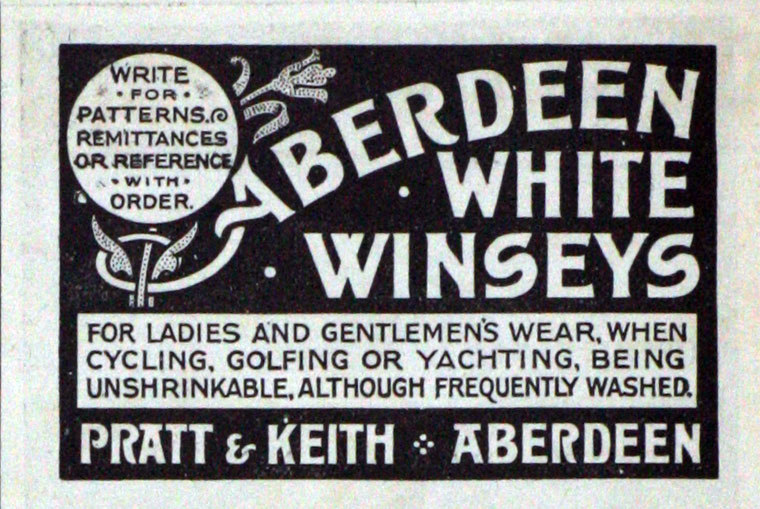
1899 Advertisement for Aberdeen firm Pratt and Keith

In Silver Screen In The Silver City, Thomson states ".. the family settled down at Crighton House (later Crightonville), 33 Leslie Road. The Crighton connection is obscure" He continues, "..when, in 1912 or 1913, the Patersons moved to 24 Powis Terrace they named the house 'Crighton Villa', a name which went with them when they moved again in 1914 to No. 46 Powis Terrace." We now know that Crighton was his mother's surname. Note that Thomson's reference to "46 Powis Terrace" is at odds with the official death registration (see below) which gives his address in June 1916 address 47 Powis Terrace.

His son Leo Paterson assisted him as a cinematograph operator before moving to Glasgow, and a married daughter emigrated to Canada. It was announced immediately after his death that his widow, Marie Louise Pascoe, who he had married 21 February 1911 and her brother Joseph Pascoe, who was formerly a watch inspector for the Canadian Pacific Railway would carry on business at the Coliseum after his death. He was survived by another son, John Innes Paterson (see illness and death, below).

Dove Paterson donated a shelter to the golf links in his native Newburgh. He had also raised funds for the Red Cross Society and other war organisations by giving entertainments in rural areas and donating the proceeds.

== Illness and death ==
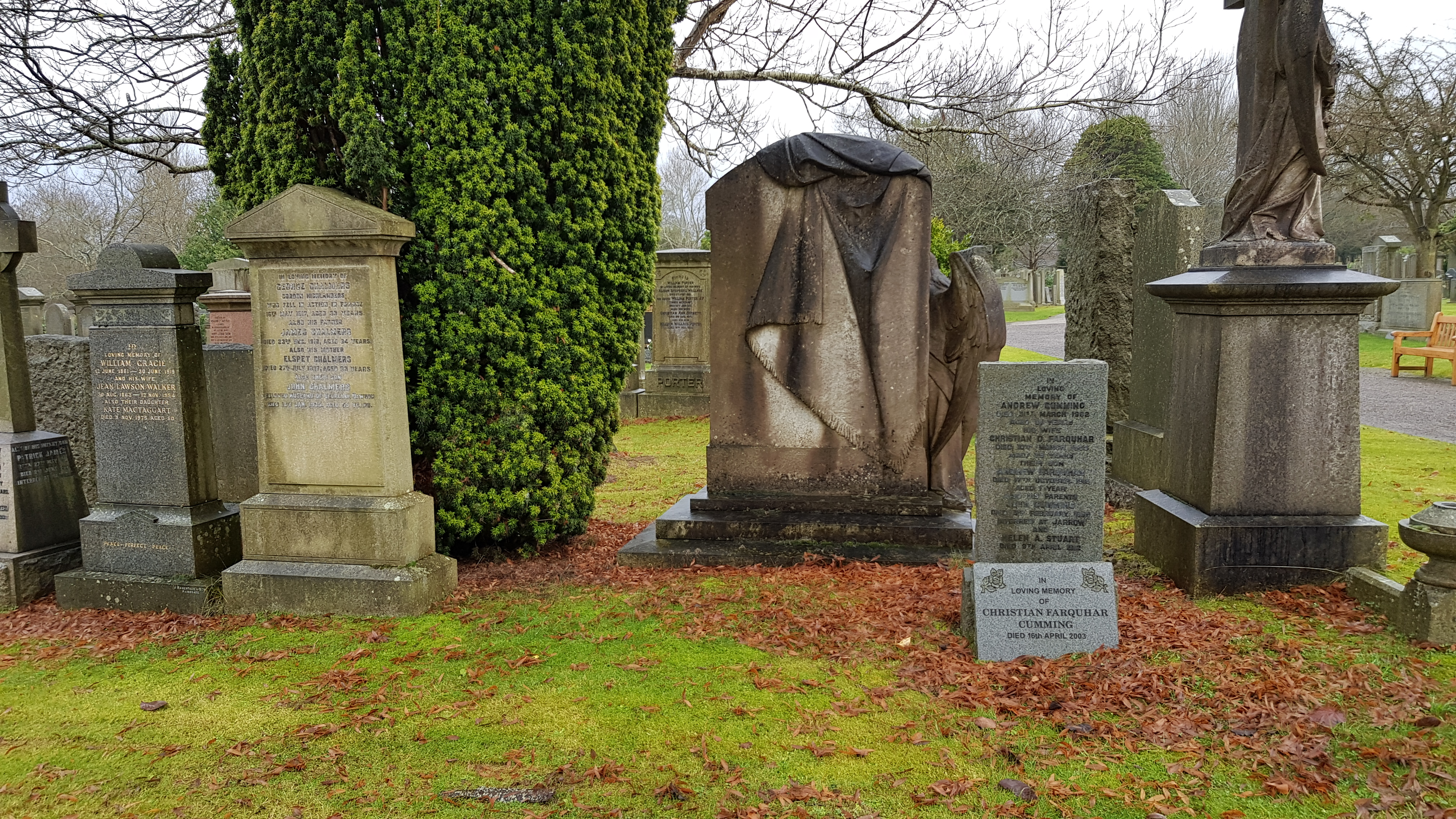
The unmarked grave of William Dove Paterson at Springbank Cemetery, Aberdeen

On 16 June 1916, at 08:15 am, Dove Paterson died at the Aberdeen Royal Infirmary. He had taken cramps while bathing at Aberdeen Beach on Sunday 28 May and had been pulled unconscious from the sea. Despite making an apparent recovery, he succumbed to pneumonia and died.

His death registration, notified by his son John Innes Paterson, gives his name at death as William Dove Paterson. His profession is recorded as Cinematograph Proprietor, and his widow as Marie Louise Pascoe. An entry in the Register of Corrected Entries for the Parish of St Nicholas gives Paterson's name as 'William Donald Paterson (otherwise William "Dove" Paterson).' His cause of death, which appeared as "pneumonia" on his original death certificate is replaced by "Pneumonia following sudden collapse while bathing in the sea on 28th May 1916." Thomson states that Paterson was in the habit of regularly swimming at the beach and on this occasion had been bathing 400 yards north of the Bathing Station where he had got into difficulties.

The funeral service, on Monday 19 June 1916, which was attended by numerous local dignitaries, was conducted at his home at Crighton Villa, 47 Powis Terrace by Revd T McWilliam of Foveran and Revd. Andrew Dickson, of Hilton United Free Church.

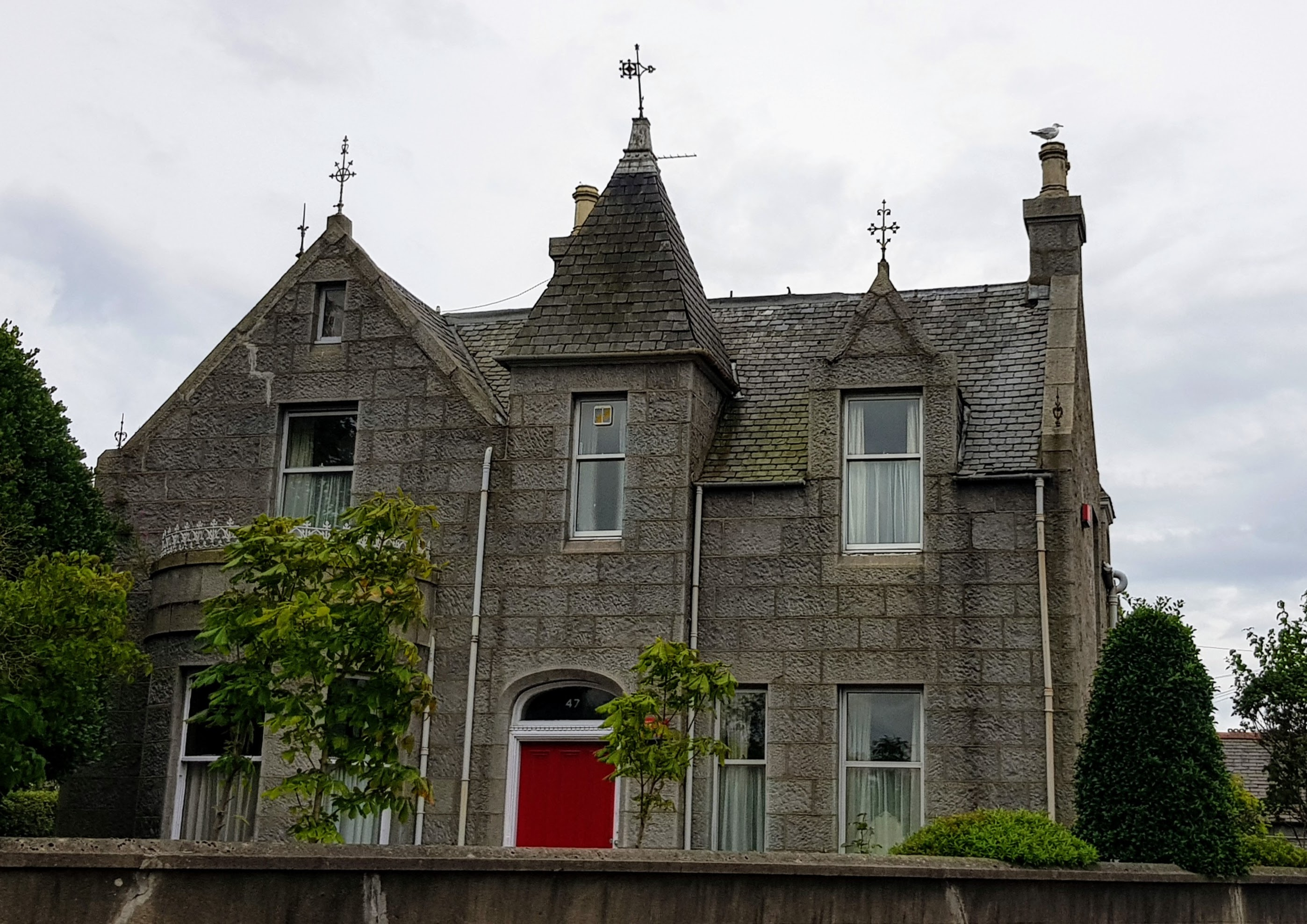
47 Powis Terrace, Aberdeen

He is buried at Springbank Cemetery in plot 79. Despite the start of a campaign in the Bioscope, the trade newspaper, wherein one correspondent pledges a guinea to start a subscription to "raise a stone to his memory", there is no headstone on the grave site to mark his burial (see photo).

== His estate ==
On Monday 26 June 1916 an Executry Notice appeared in the Aberdeen Daily Journal giving creditors 7 days to lodge claims with Joseph Johnston, Solicitor, 129 Union Street. Paterson's car, a "25-50 HP Argyll Touring Motor Car with 5-seated Torpedo body" was advertised for sale at Milnes' Sale Rooms on 26 July 1916. In August 1916 it was reported in the Kinematograph Weekly - another trade newspaper - that the Colliseum Picture House had been offered for sale.

By 26 October, The Bioscope was carrying an advert from Mrs Dove Paterson that she was available for cinema work. The Colliseum, "a finely decorated hall, seated for 900" was offered to let along with the "plant, screen and other equipment, having been taken over by the proprietors" in the Kinematograph Weekly of 9 November 1916. On 2 February 1917 it was reported that Crighton Villa, the Patersons' home at 47 Powis Terrace had been sold for the upset price of £1000. On 8 March 1917 Paterson's "films, photographic appliances .. magic latern slides ... screens" and other equipment were auctioned at Milnes' auction house in North Silver Street.

An official advertisement by George Duncan, Advocate, Aberdeen who was Paterson's Judicial Factor, indicated that he was about to pay claims on the estate and distribute assets. It gave claimants seven days to lodge claims. In 1986 one of Dove Paterson's tents which he used for "Al Fresco Cinematograph Shows" turned up in an attic in Cruden Bay.

== Works cited ==
- Thomson, Michael (1988). Silver Screen In The Silver City. Aberdeen University Press. pp. 18, 20, 25, 28, 34, 35, 37, 39, 40, 44, 46, 47. 57, 67, 70, 71, 81, 94, 97. Aberdeen. Aberdeen University Press. ISBN 0080364020. OCLC 21674082
- Aberdeen Daily Journal, 17 June 1916. pp. 3, 6
- Team, National Records of Scotland Web (2013-05-31). "National Records of Scotland". National Records of Scotland. Retrieved 2019-08-22.
