= Sheriffs in South Africa =

Sheriffs in South Africa are officers of the court and function as the executive arm of the court. They are responsible for serving court processes like summonses and subpoenas. They play an important role in the execution of court orders like the attachments of immovable and movable property; evictions, demolitions etc. The Sheriffs Act 90 of 1986, which came into operation on 1 March 1990, governs the sheriffs' profession. A sheriff is appointed by the Minister of Justice and Correctional Services in terms of Section 2 of the Act.

== South African Board for Sheriffs ==
The South African Board for Sheriffs is a statutory body established under section 7 of the Sheriffs Act and consists of 11 members appointed by the Minister of Justice and Correctional Services. The Executive Manager of the Board, Sharon Snell is responsible for the day-to-day operations. The Board has as its main responsibility to safeguard the interests of the general public against abuse by the sheriffs. The Board has disciplinary authority over sheriffs and deputy sheriffs.

== Fiduciary duty ==
Sheriffs are in a position of trust and collect and receive trust moneys belonging to third parties. Sheriffs have to open and maintain a separate trust account wherein all trust moneys are deposited which they hold or receive on behalf of third parties. Trust moneys do not form part of the assets of the sheriffs estate in the event of insolvency or death.

== Fidelity Fund for Sheriffs ==
Section 26 of the Act created the Fidelity Fund for Sheriffs. The Fidelity Fund is controlled and managed by the Board. Its purpose is to compensate persons who suffer a loss due to the inappropriate actions of a sheriff.
