= Charles Reid (photographer) =

Scottish commercial photographer

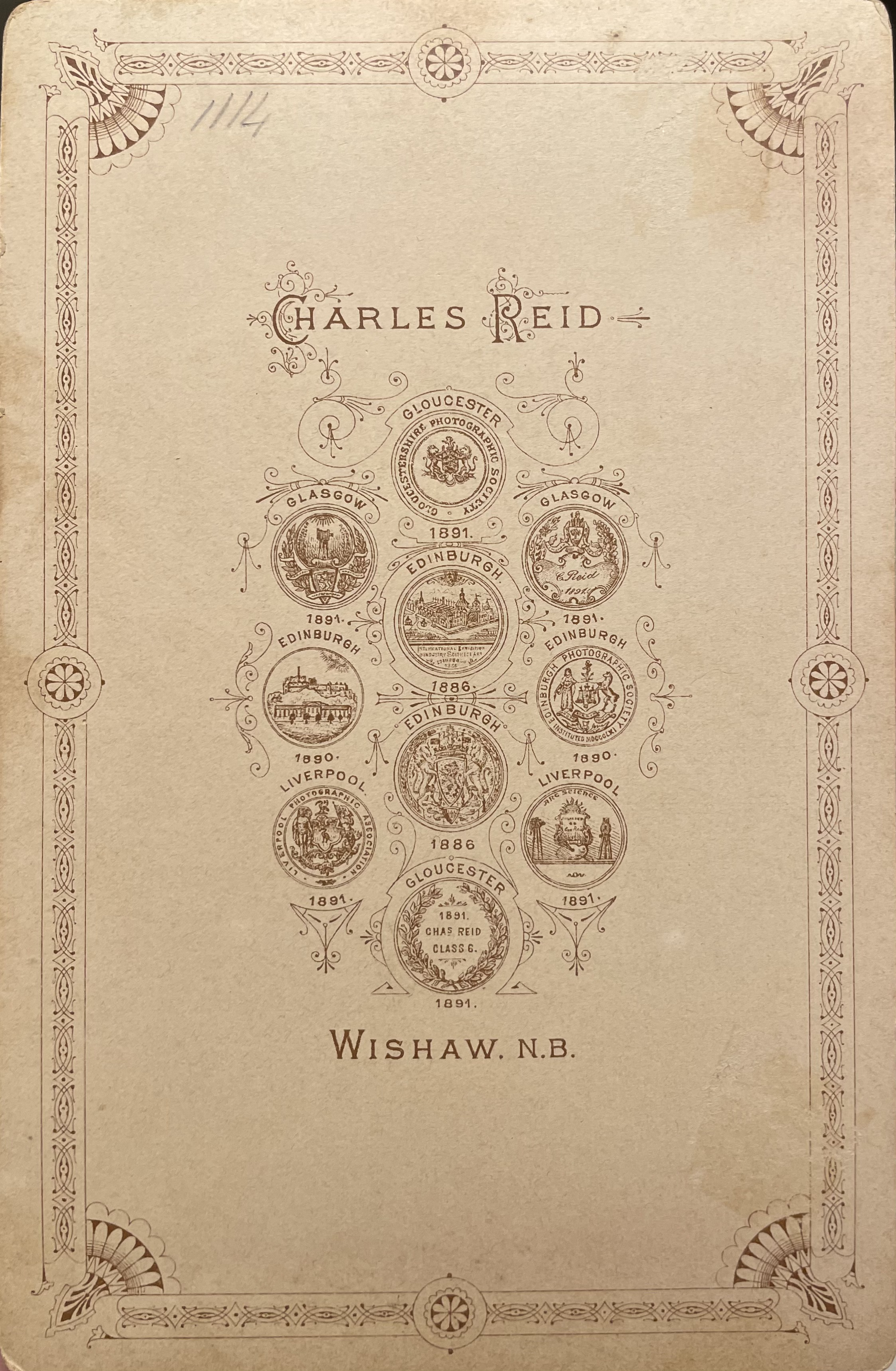
- Born: 20 September 1837
- Died: 1929 (aged 91–92)
- Known for: Photography

Charles Reid (20 September 1837 – 1929) was one of the first and most successful commercial photographers in Scotland. He pioneered the photography of livestock and wildlife in an era when very long exposures were generally required. In a 50-year career, he travelled all over the UK.

Reid was born in Turriff, Aberdeenshire, Scotland, the son of William Reid, a plasterer and labourer, and Isabella Findlater. Reid married and had seven children. Reid began work as a cattle herds boy at the age of 10. An apprenticeship to a shoemaker followed and then work as a post runner. The gift of a camera from a lodger started him on the career that would occupy the remainder of his days. The local trade directory indicates that Reid had a studio in Turriff until around 1876, after which he settled in Wishaw and set up a studio in Shand Street.

He travelled the length and breadth of Britain photographing the prize race horses and breeding stock of the landed gentry. For many years he was the official photographer to the Highland an Agricultural Society of Scotland and to the Royal Agricultural Society of England.

Ian Sumner in The Encyclopedia of 19th Century Photography, 2013 said of Reid "Reid's pictures are always well composed and show good technique and many examples of his small studies were purchased by artists as reference for their paintings and sculptures". Reid produced a large quantity of high-quality albumen and carbon prints. His large carbon studies of Highland cattle and sheep graced many late Victorian parlours. Reid also ran a photographic studio in Wishaw that produced portraits and cabinet cards typical of the period.

== Gallery ==
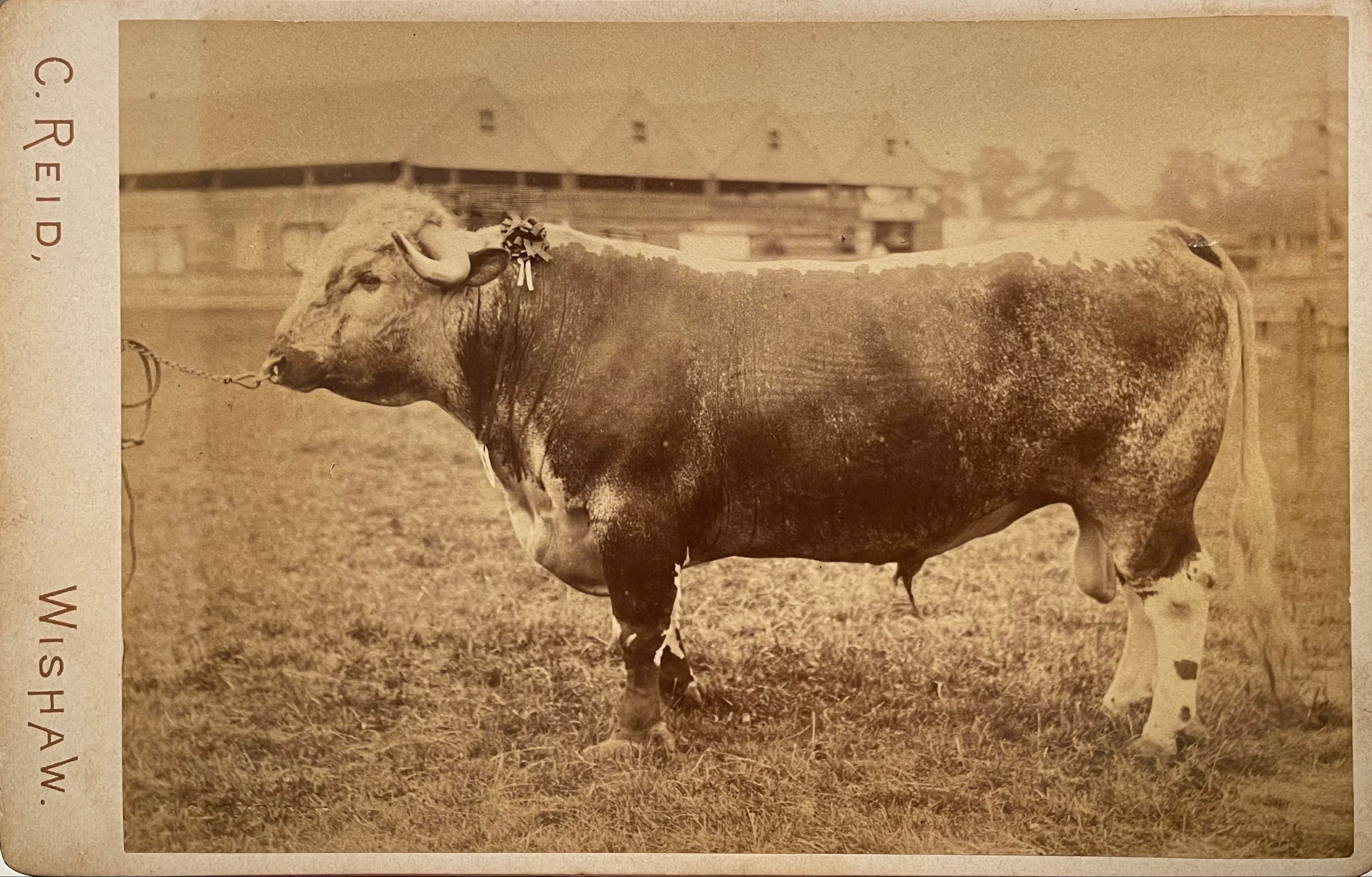
Portrait of a Bull ca 1891-1892 albumen print mounted to cabinet card.

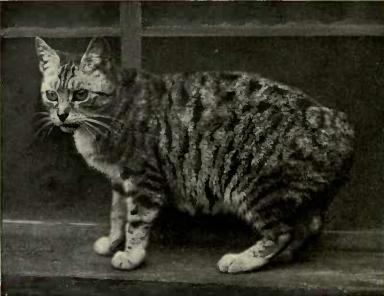
Manx Tabby, 1903, published in "The Book of the Cat" by Frances Simpson.

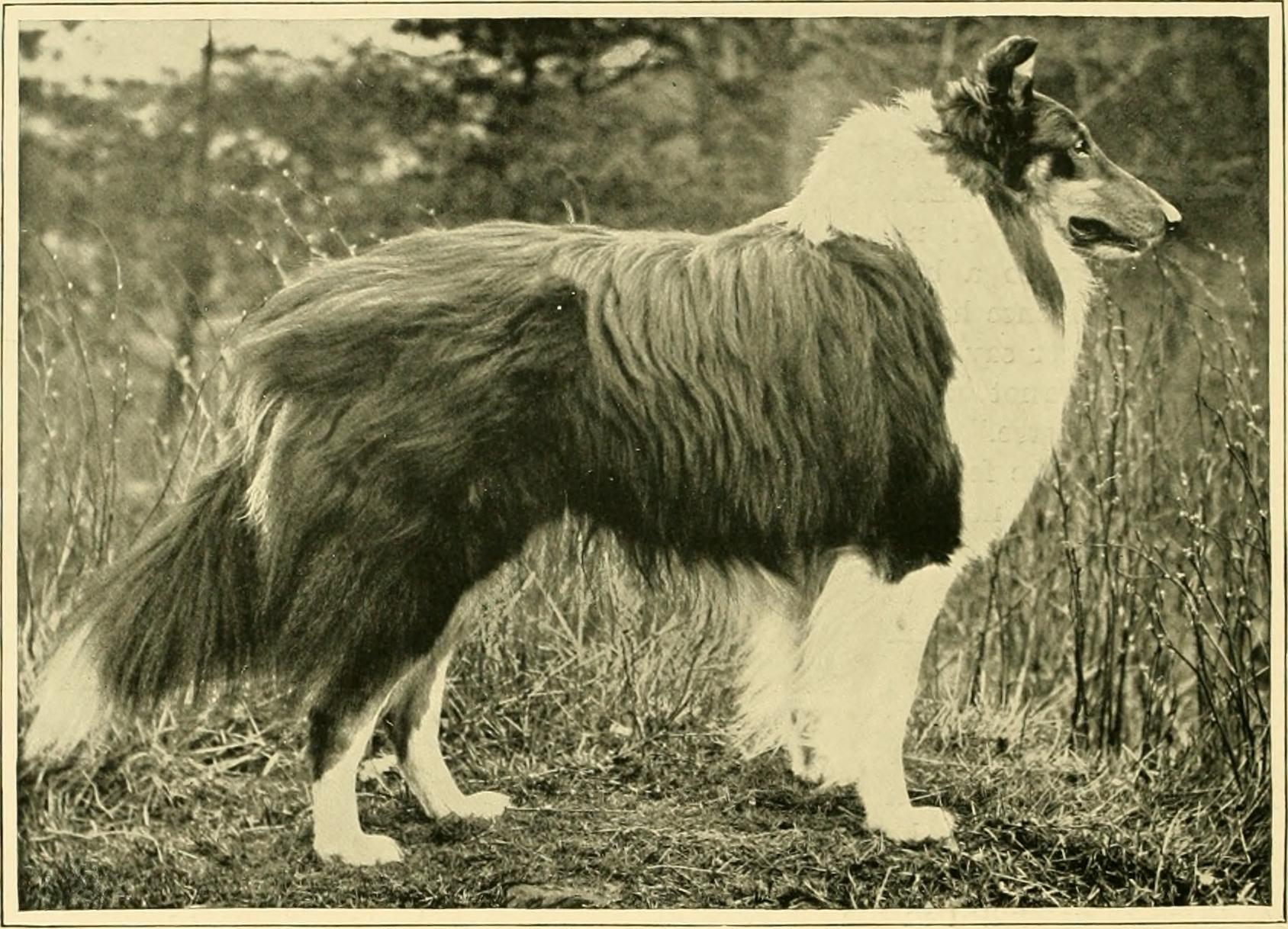
Mr. R.A. Tait's Wishaw Leader, 1911, published in "The new book of the dog : a comprehensive natural history of British dogs and their foreign relatives, with chapters on law, breeding, kennel management, and veterinary treatment" by Robert Leighton.

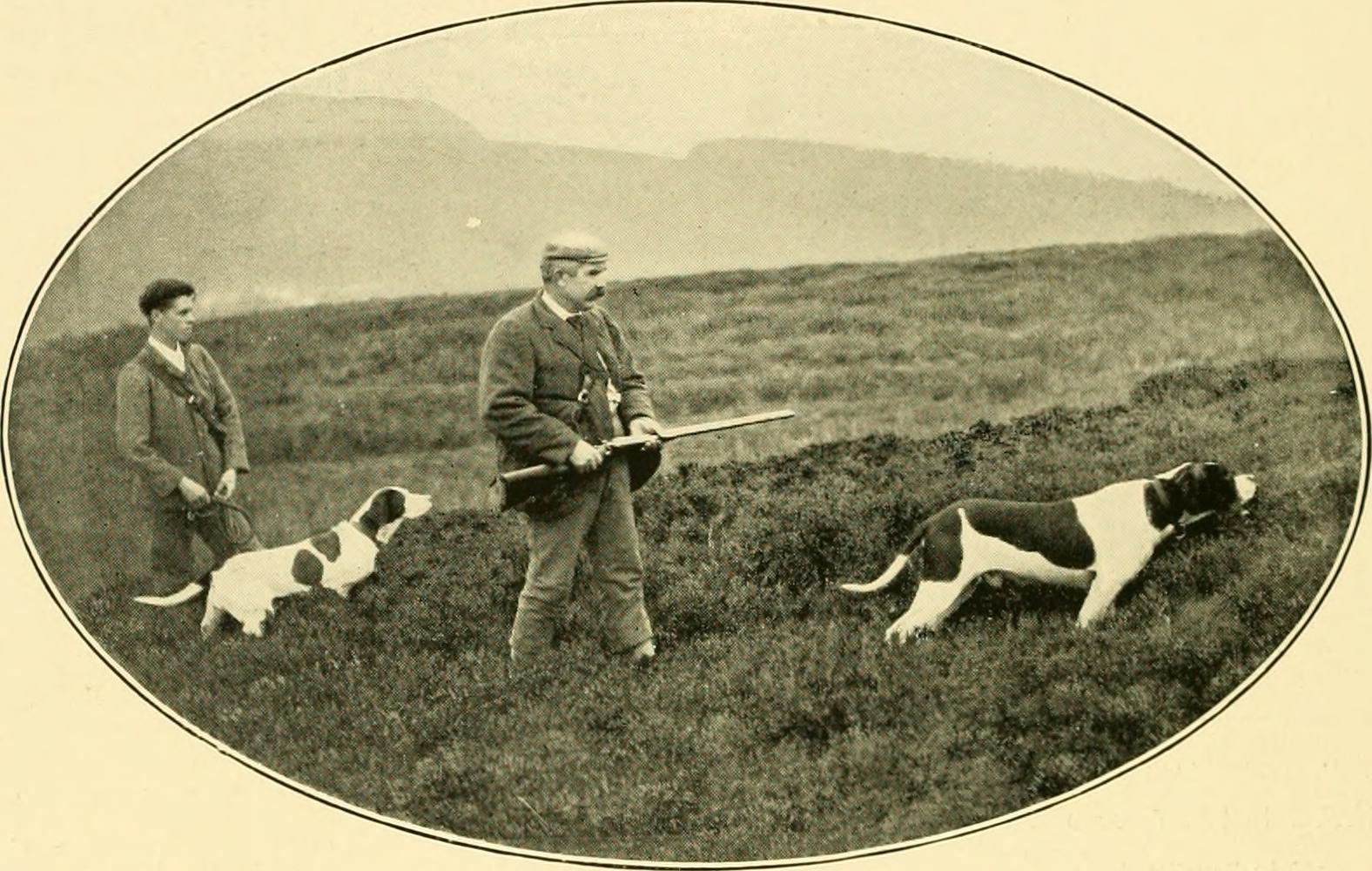
Waiting the Flight, 1911, published in "The new book of the dog : a comprehensive natural history of British dogs and their foreign relatives, with chapters on law, breeding, kennel management, and veterinary treatment" by Robert Leighton.

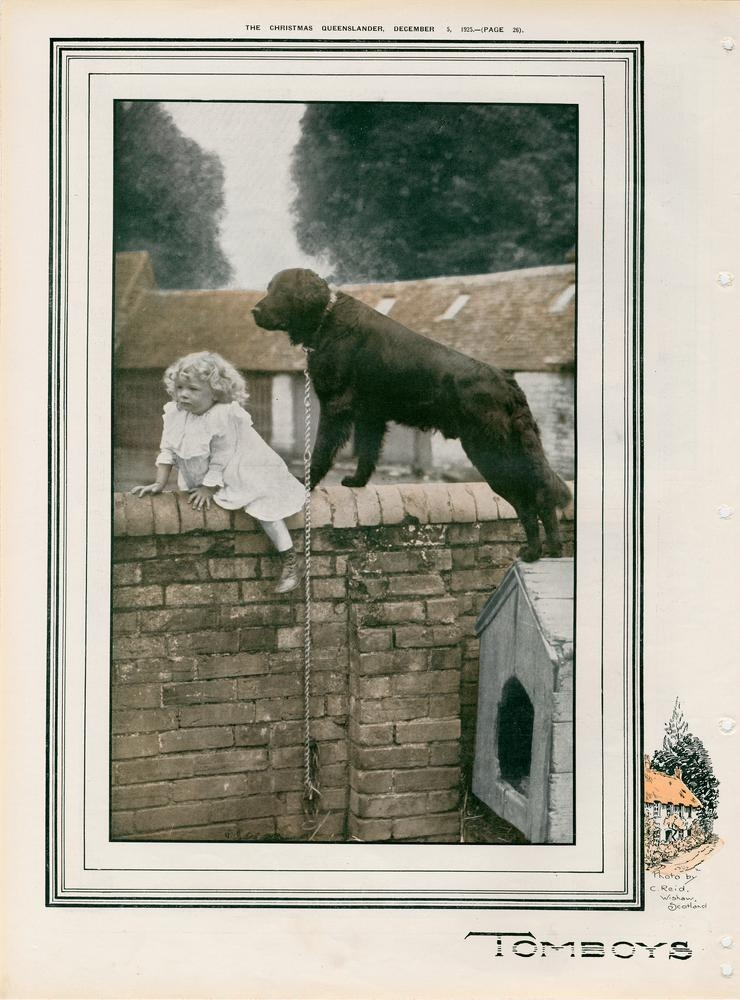
A young blond-haired child sits on a brick wall with her black dog, both looking at someone or something in the distance, 1925, published in The Queenslander, 5 December 1925, p. 26.

== Publications ==
- Reid, Charles, Animal Studies (Photographs From Life). Charles Letts & Company 1902
- Reid Charles, Bird Life Containing Over One Hundred Illustrations of Birds and Their Nests from Photographs. T. N. Foulis, 1914
- Scottish Country Life magazine of 1915, pages 189–190, "A Master of Photography : Charles Reid, Wishaw" (article)
