= Turra Coo =

Cow used in insurance protests

The Turra Coo (Doric for "the Turriff Cow") was a white Ayrshire-Shorthorn cross dairy cow which lived near the Aberdeenshire town of Turriff in north-east Scotland in the early twentieth century. The cow became famous following a dispute between her owner, supported by local people, against the government over taxes and compulsory national insurance.

== Background ==
Under the Liberal government of the 1910s, the Chancellor of the Exchequer David Lloyd George introduced a scheme whereby National Insurance contributions (by employer) became compulsory for all workers between the ages of 16 and 70. This was enacted via the National Insurance Act 1911, and caused outrage among the farmers local to Turriff, who claimed that their contributions were too high; and that, as they were rarely able to be off work due to illness like industrial workers, it was unfair for them to have to pay for a service they were unlikely to use.

In Turriff, popular protests were held in the Johnston and Paterson Mart, and Lendrum farmer Robert Paterson refused to stamp the insurance cards of his employees. Paterson was charged under the National Insurance Act and sentenced to pay a fine of £15 plus the arrears of national insurance contributions. Paterson paid the fine, but refused to make up the arrears, resulting in orders on 13 November 1913 for Turriff's Sheriff Officer George Keith to seize property to the value of £7 (equivalent to £870.03 in 2023) from Paterson's farm. However, this was more difficult than it seemed as officers could not move property without local assistance, and the locals refused to help in protest.

== The cow ==
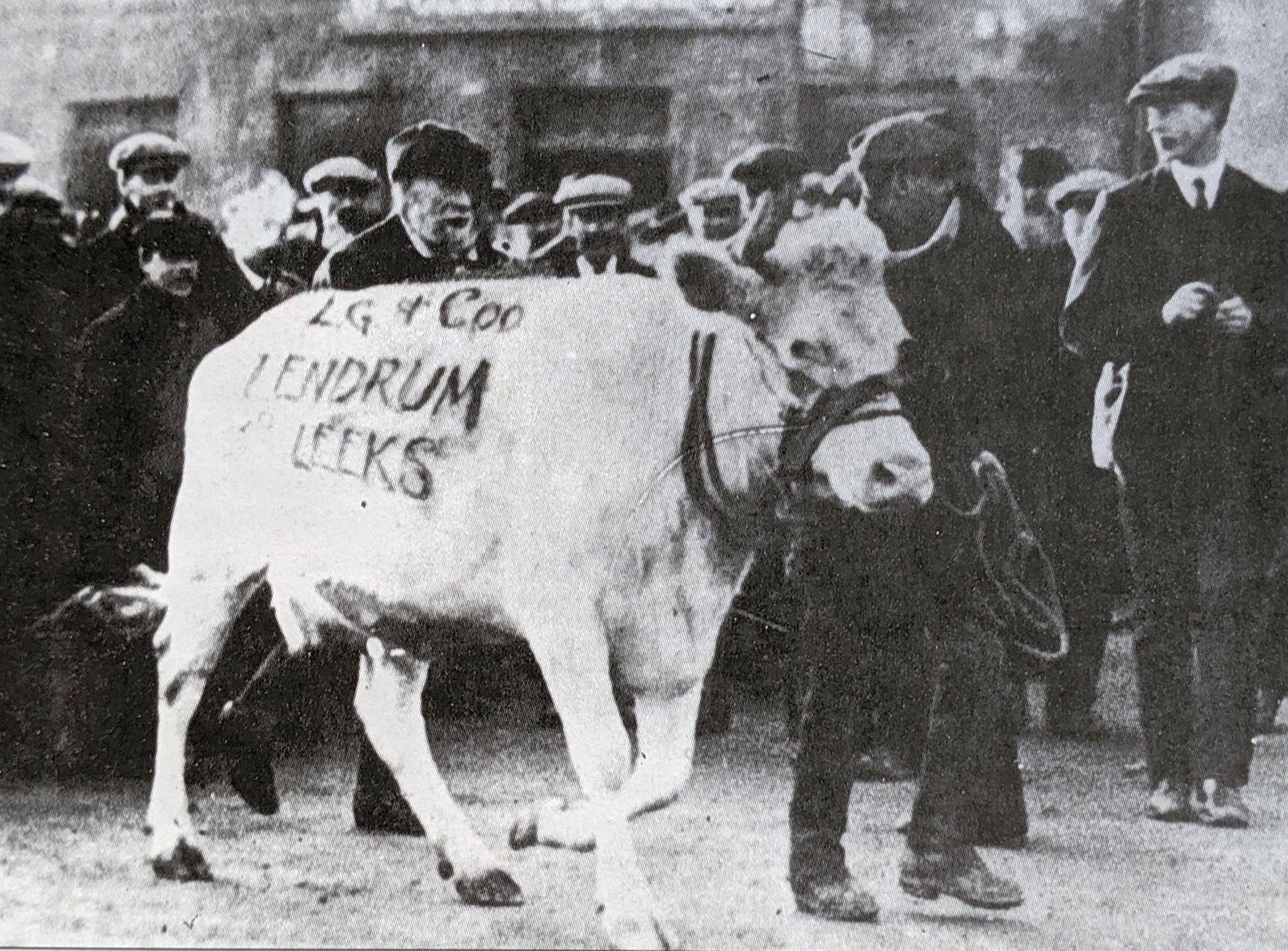
The Turra Coo painted with the slogan "Lendrum to Leeks"

Sheriff Officer George Keith poinded the only piece of property which was easily mobile: Paterson's white milk cow, which was set to be sold in Turriff on 9 December, the delay being due to the fact that both of Turriff's agricultural marts supported Paterson and refused to handle the sale, requiring a special licence to be granted for a public sale and an auctioneer to be brought in from elsewhere.

On the appointed day, the cow was taken from Paterson's farm and led to Turriff on foot. The denizens of Turriff found the cow tied in the village square, decorated in ribbons and painted with the words 'Lendrum to Leeks' in reference to Lloyd George's Welsh origin, and representing the Sheriff Officer's and government's victory over the hostile farmers. The cow was put up for auction. The response was a near riot, and a 100-strong mob proceeded to pelt the sheriff officers with rotten fruit and soot. Amidst the melee, the cow herself escaped from her handler and ran away, later being found in a nearby barn. Eight farm workers, including Paterson, were subsequently put on trial in Aberdeen for disorderly conduct but all were acquitted, having received verdicts of "not proven".

The cow was eventually taken to Aberdeen where it was sold to a farmer, Alexander Craig, for £7, but Bryony Miller, a local girl and wife of the Patersons' farmhand John Miller, with his help, rallied the local community together to buy back the cow for Lendrum. The presentation of the cow back to the Patersons on 20 January 1914 was a major public event; it was estimated that more than 3,000 people turned out to see the cow paraded in triumph through Turriff, adorned with ribbons and garlands of dried flowers, painted with the slogan "Free!! Divn't ye wish that ye were me" and accompanied by a band playing "See the Conquering Hero Comes". The cow returned to the Patersons' farm at Lendrum, where she died six years later and was buried in a corner of the farmland.

== The cow in film ==
A film was made of the cow. This was shown at both The Gaiety and Coliseum cinemas in Aberdeen in February 1914. These were operated by William Dove Paterson "who took the film to Turriff for a special show in aid of the Parish Church renovation scheme, and to the Victoria Hall, Ellon, where great cheers and applause greeted the appearance on screen of several well-known farmers."

== Sculpture and commemoration ==
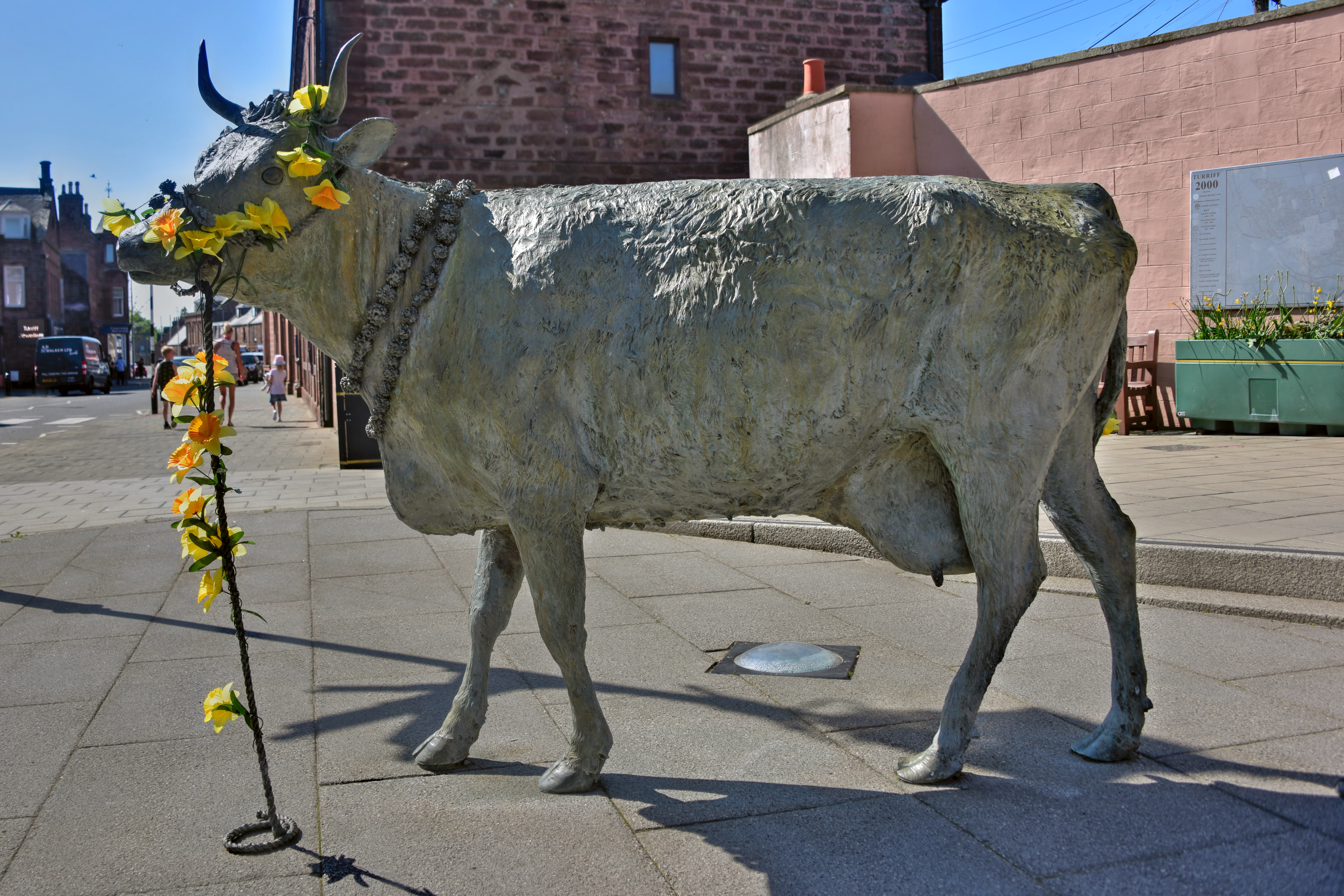
Turra Coo sculpture in Turriff

The case became a cause celebre at the time and numerous souvenir items were produced featuring likenesses of the Coo and frequently adorned with the slogan "Lendrum to Leeks".

The foghorn of Girdle Ness Lighthouse was nicknamed the 'Torry Coo', as an allusion to the cow, and the horn's cow-like bellow.

On 31 October 1971, a roadside monument was unveiled at Lendrum, with a plaque featuring a silhouette of a cow's head and the words "The Famous 'Turra Coo' incident took place in 1913 when Robert Paterson headed resistance to injustice to farm workers in the insurance act."

On 20 November 2010, a sculpture of the Turra Coo by David Blyth, Charles Engebretsen and Ginny Hutchinson was unveiled in Turriff town centre, at the junction of the two major shopping streets, a spot now known locally as "Coo Corner". The sculpture was based on a stuffed cow known as "Alese" and bearing a strong resemblance to photographs of the original Turra Coo. Alese herself is on display at the Aberdeenshire Farming Museum in Mintlaw.

The centenary was officially marked in Turriff on 16 November 2013, with various events revolving around a dramatic re-enactment of the story.

In 2014, the town's Highland League football club, Turriff United F.C., adopted a mascot based on the Turra Coo (though unlike the original, the mascot is usually referred to as male).
