= Turriff RFC =

Rugby union club based in Turriff, Scotland

- Full name: Turriff Rugby Football Club
- Nickname: Turra Coos
- Founded: 2019
- Location: Turriff, Scotland
- Ground: The Haughs Showground
- President: John Hester & Lyndsey Hester
- League: Caledonia North Two
- 2024–25: Caledonia North Non-League
Team kit

Turriff RFC is a rugby union club based in Turriff Scotland.

== History ==
=== Original club ===
The first Turriff rugby club was formed in 1905. It was formed by John Thomas Ralph McKay, a player that later played for Fraserburgh RFC, Aberdeenshire RFC and London Scottish F.C. The Banffshire Journal and General Advertiser of Tuesday 5 December 1905 reporting:

A Rugby Football Club has been formed, under the name Turriff Rugby Football Club (colour, blue), and the under mentioned have consented to become patrons:- Patroness Miss Grant Duff Ainslie of Delgaty Castle; patrons. Sir G. W. Abercrombie Bart. of Forglen. and Mr J. A. Milne of Ardmiddle; president, ex-Baillie J. N. Ritchie. Tbe [sic?] following are office bearers :—Captain, Mr J. T. R. McKay; vice captain, Mr Wm. Bremner; secretary and treasurer, J. F. Thompson. The members held a practice match on Saturday, and made good progress.

At the start of 1906–07 season, McKay had already moved on, and William Bremner took over the role of captain. The Peterhead Sentinel and General Advertiser for Buchan District of Saturday 29 September 1906 stating:

The annual meeting of the Turriff Rugby Football Club was held in the Fife Arms Hotel on Wednesday. The following office-bearers were elected for the season: Captain W. Bremner; vice-captain, F. Maxwell; secretary and treasurer. G. K. McCulloch, North Scotland Bank.

The original club played at Hutcheon Park in Turriff.

It is likely that this original club folded shortly after the 1906–07 season, not surviving the First World War. John Thomas Ralph McKay, a banker and accountant to trade, married Edith Julia Marr in 1910, joined the Bank of India; but on the First World War he enlisted with Vaughan's Rifles in the Indian Army. He died in Palestine on 30 March 1918, whilst trying to seize El Kefr village. He is buried in Ramleh War Cemetery.

=== 21st Century ===
The present club was founded in late 2018. It began when husband and wife John and Lyndsey Hester, who previously played at the Mill Hill club in London, saw an opportunity and demand for a rugby union club in the area. The Hesters became co-presidents of the club, founding the men's and women's sides simultaneously. The club became an associate member of the Scottish Rugby Union in 2019.

Lyndsey Hester, co-president of the Turriff club, explained:

From the outset, we were always adamant that Turriff were not going to be focused on building a men's team first and then eventually a women's team. It's been of equal importance to create the teams together. I think that approach really helped to build strong relationships within the club and means that everyone feels valued.

Turriff are the fourth rugby union team to join the Scottish Rugby Union leagues in the north-east of Scotland (after Banff, Fraserburgh and Peterhead) in recent years; and the area has now been called a 'hot-bed' of rugby union.

Since its founding, the club has, until 2020, been negiotiating with Aberdeenshire Council to find a home. They were holding weekly training sessions at the leisure centre and could not play home matches. The club co-president John Hester explained the process to find a home:

We’ve been working for almost a year with the council and Live Life Aberdeenshire to find a permanent place to play as for the last year we’ve been holding weekly training sessions on the facility at the leisure centre. Now we have been given this space in the showground. It was once used as the cricket ground and now the Turriff Show will use it for six weeks of the year but for the remaining time we can use it. All in all, it is a fantastic opportunity for us and will allow us to work with the Scottish Rugby Union to get into the Caledonian League.

In February 2020, Turriff RFC took over the grounds of the defunct Turriff Cricket Club. The Haughs Showground is also used by the Turiff Show.

Due to the grounds prior use and continued use as a showground, the rugby union club boasts a grandstand.

Turriff RFC co-president John Hester hailed the rugby pitch as one of the best in north-east Scotland:

It's fantastic to physically see it, the hard work has paid off. From our first chats with Stuart [Grant], this is what we wanted, to have a rugby club in the community, and to be here with the posts up and lines painted. To have a grandstand at a new rugby pitch is nothing short of a miracle. Having somewhere where people can watch rugby in all weathers is a good selling factor. There's the play park and boating lake, it's a wonderful area. We don't just want one person to come down and watch rugby, we want several with their friends and families. It's an emotional day for me and the rest of the guys to get to where we are and have arguably the best rugby pitch in the North-east of Scotland.

One of the highlights in the club's short history was the Turriff Women's side winning the Huntly Sevens in 2019. Lyndsay Hester explained the growing success of the Women's side: "To have started off with just five of us at training, to a full team who have successfully competed in a tournament event was just fantastic. Although normal training is off, we're all keeping up our fitness individually and we are really looking forward to entering the development league once rugby resumes. Although it's been on hold it's still been an exciting time, and we're raring to go."

Rugby union - outwith the highest professional and international level - was halted in Scotland due to coronavirus in March 2020. The men's side were accepted into Caledonia North 4 for the season 2021–22.

As rugby union is growing in the north-east of Scotland, there is the prospect of local derbies for new clubs like Turriff. Lyndsay Hester predicts a bright future: "It will be good to go into a league in which we have two local derbies. We believe we are on a winner, the potential of the area is huge. Our costs are minimal, as we have no clubhouse, but we are working towards building one."

== Sides ==
The club runs a men's side, a women's side and youth sides.

Training is on Tuesdays and Thursdays from 7pm to 9pm, but the club asks that you turn up for 6.45pm to ensure a prompt start.

== Sevens ==
The club co-president John Hester has expressed his desire for Turriff RFC to run a Sevens tournament in the future stating "We want to hold fun events like sevens and touch rugby to highlight our new surroundings."

== Honours ==
=== Women's ===
- Huntly Sevens
  - Champions (1): 2019
