= Turriff Advertiser =

Weekly newspaper in Turriff, Aberdeenshire, Scotland

The Turriff Advertiser (nicknamed "The Squeak") is a paid-for weekly newspaper in Turriff, Aberdeenshire, founded in 1933 and published by W. Peters (Print & Design) Ltd. When it was first published, the paper was called the Turriff & District Advertiser. It is published every Thursday, though it bears a Friday cover date.

The paper covers the town itself and a wide rural area. It is noted for its extensive coverage of the local sports scene, particularly the fortunes of the town's Highland Football League club, Turriff United F.C.

The Turriff Advertiser has two sister papers, the Inverurie Advertiser, published in 1952, and Ellon Advertiser, published in 1957. All of these papers are produced at W. Peters' premises in Turriff. News and sport are local to each, though some features such as the reports on local livestock markets, bulletins from the local MP and MSP (currently David Duguid and Gillian Martin, respectively), and the entertainment pages (which mostly focus on forthcoming attractions in the nearest city, Aberdeen), are common to all three.

In June 2019 it was announced that the Turriff Advertiser and its two sister papers, the Inverurie Advertiserand the Ellon Advertiser had been sold to Scottish Provincial Press, with the new owners taking control on 1 July 2019.

On 11 December 2019 it was announced that Scottish Provincial Press had gone into administration briefly on Tuesday 10 December 2019 and that the Iliffe Media Group had taken control of the business and the 18 regional titles including the Turriff Advertiser, the company would now trade as Highland News and Media.

== See also ==
- Jack Webster, former journalist for the newspaper
