= List of listed buildings in Turriff, Aberdeenshire =

This is a list of listed buildings in the parish of Turriff in Aberdeenshire, Scotland.

== List ==
Name	Location	Date Listed	Grid Ref. (Note: Sometimes known as OSGB36, the grid reference (where provided) is based on the British national grid reference system used by the Ordnance Survey. • "Guide to National Grid". Ordnance Survey. • "Get-a-map". Ordnance Survey.)	Geo-coordinates	Notes	LB Number (Note: Historic Environment Scotland assign a unique alphanumeric identifier to each designated site in Scotland, for listed buildings this always begins with "LB", for example "LB12345".)	Image
2-8 (Even Numbers Only) Putachie Path				57°32′16″N 2°27′55″W	Category C(S)	42165	Upload Photo
Castle hill, Deveron country house AKA Buckleys				57°32′16″N 2°27′49″W	Category B	42171	Upload Photo
Hatton Castle Coach House				57°30′41″N 2°24′30″W	Category C(S)	16398	Upload Photo
Bridgend Farmhouse				57°31′57″N 2°27′52″W	Category C(S)	16410	Upload Photo
Old Tollhouse, Turriff Angling Association Shelter (Knockiemill Lodge)				57°32′34″N 2°28′44″W	Category B	16417	Upload Photo
Delgatie Castle				57°32′39″N 2°24′43″W	Category A	16421	Upload Photo
Delgatie Castle, Gates At Garden Cottages				57°32′51″N 2°25′10″W	Category C(S)	16427	Upload Photo
Town Cross Of Turriff, Castle Street				57°32′15″N 2°27′51″W	Category B	42167	Upload another image See more images
19, 21 High Street				57°32′15″N 2°27′42″W	Category C(S)	42169	Upload Photo
White Heather Hotel 14 High Street				57°32′14″N 2°27′40″W	Category C(S)	42173	Upload Photo
Municipal Buildings, High Street				57°32′14″N 2°27′45″W	Category C(S)	42174	Upload Photo
Towie Barclay Castle				57°29′06″N 2°25′41″W	Category A	16405	Upload Photo
Woodhead House (Formerly Woodhead House Hotel)				57°29′46″N 2°27′37″W	Category C(S)	16411	Upload Photo
Ardmiddle Lodge				57°31′28″N 2°31′25″W	Category C(S)	16412	Upload Photo
Delgatie Dovecot Near Delgatie Castle				57°32′43″N 2°24′41″W	Category B	16422	Upload Photo
Greengate Lodge And Gates Delgatie				57°32′34″N 2°26′53″W	Category B	16428	Upload Photo
Clydesdale Bank, 1 Main Street And Balmellie Street				57°32′15″N 2°27′36″W	Category C(S)	42175	Upload Photo
St. Congan's Episcopal Church Deveron Street				57°32′21″N 2°28′09″W	Category C(S)	42181	Upload Photo
St. Congan's Churchyard And Gateway				57°32′16″N 2°27′56″W	Category B	42164	Upload Photo
Hatton Castle Estate Houses				57°30′40″N 2°24′32″W	Category C(S)	16399	Upload Photo
Hatton, Mausoleum				57°30′52″N 2°25′18″W	Category C(S)	16403	Upload Photo
Mill Of Ashogle				57°33′48″N 2°29′45″W	Category C(S)	16408	Upload Photo
Delgatie Castle, Bridge Over Burn Of Burnside At Head Of Fish Pond				57°32′42″N 2°24′37″W	Category B	16425	Upload Photo
Hatton Castle				57°30′44″N 2°24′25″W	Category A	16431	Upload another image See more images
The Lodging And Adjoining Shop (Hutcheon) High Street				57°32′14″N 2°27′50″W	Category B	42176	Upload Photo
3 Manse Terrace				57°32′20″N 2°27′52″W	Category B	42178	Upload Photo
Royal Oak Hotel, Deveron Street				57°32′20″N 2°28′04″W	Category C(S)	42182	Upload Photo
Deveron (Or Eastside) Bridge Over River Deveron Between Knockiemill And Eastside				57°32′32″N 2°28′45″W	Category B	16416	Upload Photo
Knockiemill Farmhouse				57°32′53″N 2°28′54″W	Category B	16419	Upload Photo
Delgatie Castle Laundry (Now Forester's Cottage)				57°32′42″N 2°24′40″W	Category B	16423	Upload Photo
Delgatie Castle, Garden Walls				57°32′50″N 2°24′57″W	Category C(S)	16426	Upload Photo
Craigston Castle, South Lodge With Entrance Gates, Gatepiers And Railings				57°35′01″N 2°24′26″W	Category C(S)	49407	Upload Photo
15 High Street				57°32′15″N 2°27′41″W	Category C(S)	42168	Upload Photo
45, 47 High Street				57°32′16″N 2°27′47″W	Category C(S)	42170	Upload Photo
Fife Arms Hotel Square And Market Street				57°32′23″N 2°27′39″W	Category C(S)	42179	Upload Photo
Turriff Parish Church (St. Ninian's) Church Street				57°32′25″N 2°27′49″W	Category B	42162	Upload Photo
Hatton Castle, Sundial				57°30′44″N 2°24′21″W	Category B	16397	Upload Photo
Hatton, North Lodge				57°30′59″N 2°25′30″W	Category B	16402	Upload Photo
Dulcerstone Bridge Over Burn Of Dulcerstone				57°32′55″N 2°27′53″W	Category C(S)	16409	Upload Photo
Muiresk East Lodge				57°32′01″N 2°29′01″W	Category C(S)	16415	Upload Photo
Muiresk West Lodge				57°31′56″N 2°29′39″W	Category C(S)	16418	Upload Photo
North Lodge (Birkwood) Delgatie				57°32′54″N 2°25′20″W	Category B	16429	Upload Photo
Former North Of Scotland Milling Co. Building				57°31′57″N 2°27′21″W	Category C(S)	42183	Upload Photo
Old Parish Church Of St. Congan (Coav) Castle Street And Putachie Path				57°32′16″N 2°27′56″W	Category A	42163	Upload another image See more images
Hatton Castle Garden Walls Within Policies				57°30′44″N 2°24′21″W	Category C(S)	16400	Upload Photo
Hatton Home Farm				57°30′33″N 2°24′25″W	Category B	16401	Upload Photo
Muiresk House				57°32′10″N 2°29′49″W	Category B	16413	Upload Photo
Muiresk Home Farm (Original Buildings)				57°32′09″N 2°29′43″W	Category C(S)	16414	Upload Photo
15 Putachie Path (At Corner Of Castle Street And Session Close)				57°32′16″N 2°27′54″W	Category C(S)	42166	Upload Photo
British Legion 2 High Street (High Street Section Only)				57°32′14″N 2°27′37″W	Category C(S)	42172	Upload Photo
39-41 Main Street S.E. Corner Of Square				57°32′19″N 2°27′38″W	Category C(S)	42177	Upload Photo
Panton House, Fife Street				57°32′20″N 2°27′34″W	Category B	42180	Upload Photo
Old Toll House Darra Lodge				57°30′48″N 2°25′40″W	Category C(S)	16404	Upload Photo
Towie Barclay Steading East Of Castle				57°29′06″N 2°25′39″W	Category B	16406	Upload Photo
Wrae Farmhouse				57°33′55″N 2°27′40″W	Category C(S)	16407	Upload Photo
Fintry Farmhouse				57°34′50″N 2°24′27″W	Category B	16420	Upload Photo
Delgatie Home Farm At Delgatie Castle				57°32′44″N 2°25′00″W	Category B	16424	Upload Photo
Idoch Dovecot Idoch Farm				57°31′52″N 2°23′16″W	Category B	16430	Upload Photo

== Key ==
The scheme for classifying buildings in Scotland is:

- Category A: "buildings of national or international importance, either architectural or historic; or fine, little-altered examples of some particular period, style or building type."
- Category B: "buildings of regional or more than local importance; or major examples of some particular period, style or building type, which may have been altered."
- Category C: "buildings of local importance; lesser examples of any period, style, or building type, as originally constructed or moderately altered; and simple traditional buildings which group well with other listed buildings."

In March 2016 there were 47,288 listed buildings in Scotland. Of these, 8% were Category A, and 50% were Category B, with the remaining 42% being Category C.

== See also ==
- List of listed buildings in Aberdeenshire
