= Alexander Allan Shand =

Scottish banker (1844–1930)

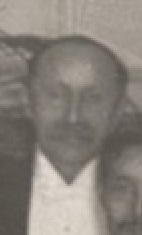
- Born: 11 February 1844; Turriff, Scotland
- Died: 12 April 1930 (aged 86); Parkstone, Dorset, United Kingdom
- Occupation: Banker
- Known for: Oyatoi Gaikokujin Banker in Japan in the 1870s
- Notable work: 銀行簿記精法 (Detailed Accounts of Bank Book-Keeping) (1873)
- Spouse: Emmeline Christmas
- Children: 8

Alexander Allan Shand (11 February 1844 – 12 April 1930) was a British banker most known for his work in the development of accountacy and early proposal of a central bank in the Japanese banking system during the Meiji era.

== Early life ==
Shand was born in the Scottish town of Turriff to James Shand the surgeon, and Margaret Allan. Shand began work first in a Scottish bank in 1859, moving to London to the Chartered Mercantile Bank of India, London and China, which obliged him to move to Hong Kong in 1863.

== Career ==
=== Japanese ministry of finance ===
In 1864 he was promoted to a managerial position and moved again to Yokohama where he also hired Takahashi Korekiyo as an assistant. In August 1872 he was given a position as an Oyatoi in the Japanese Ministry of Finance as a financial advisor, where aspects such as Double-entry bookkeeping were incorporated into the 1872 National Bank Act, which became important later on for Japanese commercial and industrial operations. Here his work Ginkobokiseiho or Detailed Accounts of Bank Book-Keeping was translated in Japanese and published in 1873, which was an important early work in introducing Western Accounting techniques. These techniques were employed early on by the Dai-Ichi Bank and were taught to Eiichi Shibusawa.

=== Introducing British accounting to Japan ===
By 1874, Shand created a public financial course under the Finance Ministry which educated 341 students between 1874 and 1879, with one third of these going on to work in the Ministry, local government or in Japanese banks, heavily influencing how Japanese accountancy; based on the British model; was taught during Japan's period becoming an industrialized nation, being translated by Joseph Heco who also acted as Shand's interpreter.

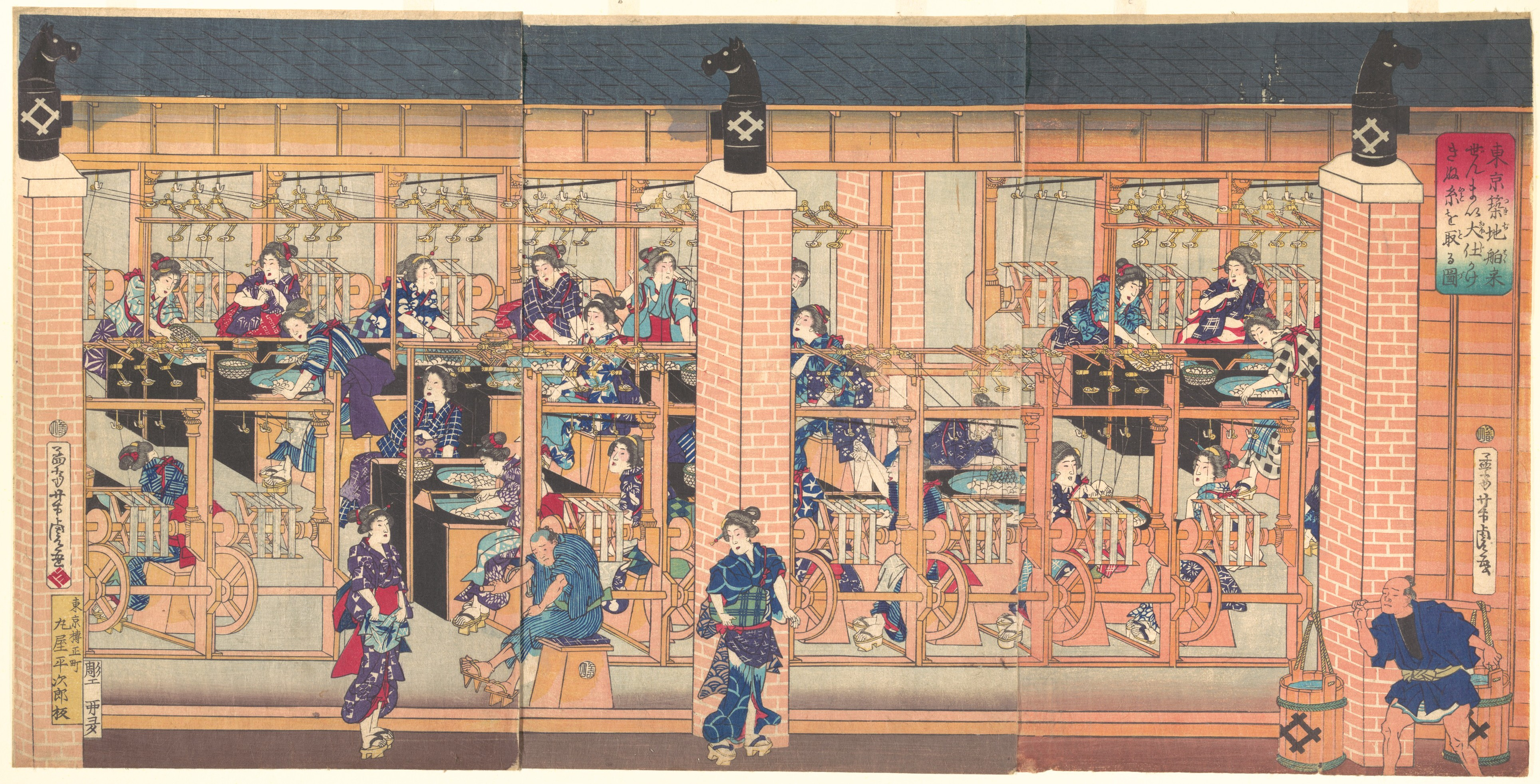
Ono ran from 1871 a silk weaving factory in Nihonbashi before the audit in 1874

In late 1874, Shand also conducted the first western style accounting audit inspection at the failed banking business of the Ono house, a wealthy Omi merchant entrepreneur (近江商人) who went bankrupt, in which he advised the creation of a Japanese central bank, which was formed a decade later. Shand would go on to teach clerks at the newly formed Central Bank. Shand later published Ginkotaii, a manual on national banks; which circulated from 1877 to 1878 in the magazine Ginkozasshi. In 1877 Shand would return to London to work with Alliance Bank which merged to form Parr's Bank in 1892 as manager of its London Lombard and Bartholomew Lane branches, due to the death of his Japanese sponsor Kido Takayoshi.

=== Financing the Russo-Japanese War ===
Principally he assisted Takahashi Korekiya, who was looking to acquire loans for the Russo-Japanese War, in his bid to acquire loans by underwriting them himself through the London market in 1898, and later in finding contacts in Hong Kong for the Yokohama Specie Bank. Indeed, he underwrote a large amount along with Jacob Schiff which funded the 1904–1905 war. During the Edwardian years he also played a central role in assisting a smooth 'succession of loans' on the London market between British and Japanese banks and governments, due to his knowledge of both countries expectations and practices.

== Personal life ==
In about 1870 Alexander Shand married Emmeline Christmas (d.1913), who gave birth to twins in 1871, totalling 8 children (Margaret, Helen, Ida, Winifred, Norman, Evan, and Hubert). Unfortunately his first born son Montague died at Lake Hakone in 1873 of dysentery.

== Recognition ==
For his services to Japan, the emperor awarded Shand the Order of the Sacred Treasure, second class in 1908. Shand was then promoted to director between 1909 and 1918 at Parrs. He left a small figure (around £500,000 in 2020) to his children upon his death as a result of losses sustained in Yokohama and Tokyo in due to the September 1923 Great Kantō earthquake in Japan.

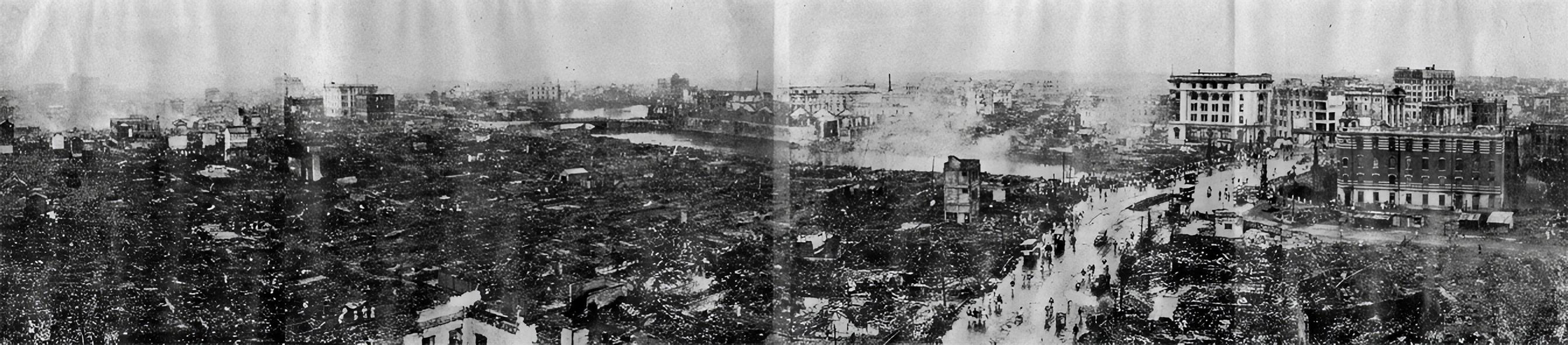
1923 Earthquake Damage in Tokyo
