= Jack Webster (Scottish journalist) =

Scottish journalist (1931–2020)

Jack Webster BEM
- Born: John Barron Webster; 8 July 1931; Maud, Aberdeenshire, Scotland
- Died: 17 March 2020 (aged 88); Glasgow, Scotland
- Education: Robert Gordon's College
- Occupations: Journalist; author
- Spouse: Eden Keith (m. 1956–1990; her death)

John Barron Webster (8 July 1931 – 17 March 2020) was a Scottish journalist and an author. He wrote eighteen books and the BBC television series The Webster Trilogy.

== Early life ==
Webster was born in 1931 in Fedderate Cottages, Maud, Aberdeenshire, to John Sr and Edith Margaret Barron. His father worked as an auctioneer at the local cattle market.

After attending Maud Primary School, Webster graduated from Aberdeen's Robert Gordon's College. He left school at the age of 14, after a combination of rheumatic fever and a dislike of his headmaster. He also survived a heart condition during his teenage years.

== Career ==
In the late 1940s, Webster began working at the Turriff Advertiser. He later moved to Aberdeen and began working at The Press and Journal, before joining the Scottish Daily Express in 1960. He worked for a period in the New York offices of the Express.

In the 1960s, Webster ghost wrote for Muhammad Ali. They met at a hotel in Giffnock, East Renfrewshire, in 1965.

One of Webster's noted meetings was with the elusive Charlie Chaplin, whom he tracked down to a hotel in Banchory, Aberdeenshire. As Chaplin signed a few autographs for Webster, the journalist reminded Chaplin that he once played the Tivoli Theatre in Aberdeen. Webster then convinced him to revisit the theatre one more time.

He wrote and appeared in the award-winning BBC documentary Webster's Roup, after which he returned to his family's farm following the death of his father in 1977.

Webster became a freelance writer for the Glasgow Herald in the 1980s.

In 1996, Webster was named Bank of Scotland Columnist of the Year. He also won UK Speaker of the Year, which earned him additional recognition, made more significant by his having overcome a speech impediment.

== Personal life ==
In 1956, Webster married Eden, with whom he had three sons, each of whom became journalists. Webster became a widower in 1990.

Webster had an affinity for the United States, especially Hollywood, visiting on many occasions. He sailed there on the RMS Queen Mary, initially, then its sister ship, the RMS Queen Elizabeth.

He was awarded an honorary degree by Aberdeen University in 2000.

In 2004, Webster gave the Founder's Day speech at Robert Gordon's College, his alma mater. He received an honorary doctorate from the college four years later.

Webster was awarded the British Empire Medal in 2012 for his services to journalism.

He was a keen ballroom dancer and a supporter of Aberdeen F.C. He wrote a history of the club for its centenary in 2003.

== Death ==
Webster died in Glasgow in 2020, of complications related to Alzheimer's disease, aged 88.

== Bibliography ==
Webster wrote eighteen books, including his three-volume memoir: A Grain of Truth (1981), Another Grain of Truth (1988) and A Final Grain of Truth (2013).
