= Turriff =

Town in Aberdeenshire, Scotland

Coordinates: 57.539031°N 2.461141°W

Turriff: Scottish Gaelic: Torraibh / Baile Thurra; Scots: Turra
- High Street, Turriff

- Location within Aberdeenshire
- Population: 4,700 (2020)
- OS grid reference: NJ725505
  - Edinburgh: 160 miles (257 km) SSW
  - London: 569 miles (916 km) SSE
- Civil parish: Turriff
- Council area: Aberdeenshire
- Lieutenancy area: Aberdeenshire
- Country: Scotland
- Sovereign state: United Kingdom
- Post town: TURRIFF
- Postcode district: AB53
- Dialling code: 01888
- Police: Scotland
- Fire: Scottish
- Ambulance: Scottish
- UK Parliament: Gordon and Buchan
- Scottish Parliament: Aberdeenshire East

Turriff (from Scottish Gaelic Torraibh 'place of round hills') is a town and civil parish in Aberdeenshire in Scotland. It lies on the River Deveron, about 166 feet (51 m) above sea level, and has a population of 5,708. In everyday speech it is often referred to by its Scots name Turra, which is derived from the Scottish Gaelic pronunciation.

== Services and amenities ==
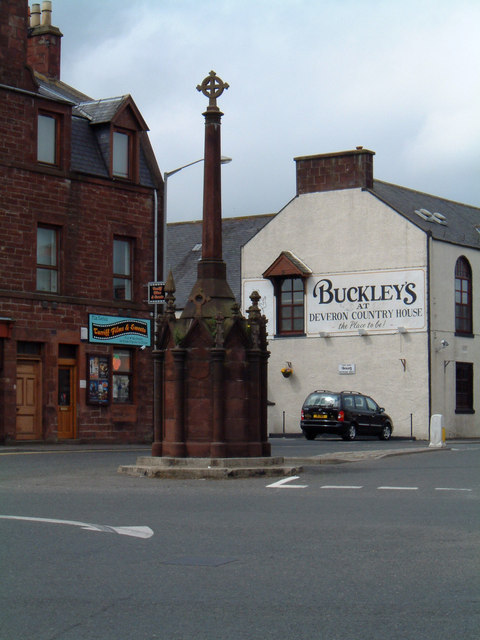
Turriff mercat cross. The local red sandstone used in the cross and the buildings behind it is characteristic of Turriff's older buildings

There are four churches in Turriff: St Ninian's (Church of Scotland, 1794), St Andrew's (Church of Scotland), St Congan's (Episcopal Church, 1862), and a Baptist church.

Turriff has a primary school, Turriff Primary School, and a secondary school, Turriff Academy. Turriff Primary School is a new build which replaced the old Markethill Primary School and opened to pupils on 22 August 2017. People from the surrounding areas, including the villages of Cuminestown, Fyvie and King Edward, attend the secondary school.

Santander UK (formerly Alliance & Leicester) have a branch in the town. This is the only remaining bank in the town. The main supermarket chains are Tesco (whose premises have previously been occupied by Presto, Gateway and Somerfield) and Co-op Food and there are numerous specialist shops including two dispensing pharmacies. The town has a library, a sports centre and swimming pool. It is served by Turriff Cottage Hospital. In October 2013, Aberdeenshire Council approved a licence to occupy the Municipal Building (previously used as council offices) to a volunteer group for use as a general community centre, while they completed their Community Asset Transfer of the building. The group renamed the building Turriff Town House. The official handover was expected to be completed in 2016, but in June 2016 the group announced that they had not been successful in their Stage 2 Community Asset Transfer. The group retained the licence to occupy until 28 October 2016, when the building was returned to Aberdeenshire Council. Turriff and District Heritage Society were granted a Community Asset Transfer of the building and renamed it Turriff Heritage Centre.

Turriff has a senior football club called Turriff United F.C. who now play in the Highland League, having been voted into membership on 26 February 2009. Turriff United Ladies play in the SWFL Second Division and there is also an amateur club, Turriff Thistle, which plays in the AAFA Division Two. There is also a rugby union club, Turriff RFC which has men and women sides.

The "Turriff Show", which is widely accepted as Scotland's largest two-day agricultural show, is held annually on the first Sunday and Monday of August; the Monday is a local holiday in the town. The show marked its 150th anniversary in 2014 with a visit from Queen Elizabeth II.

The town used to have its own weekly newspaper, the Turriff Advertiser, established in 1933 and commonly nicknamed The Squeak. The paper ceased printing in late 2022.

== History ==
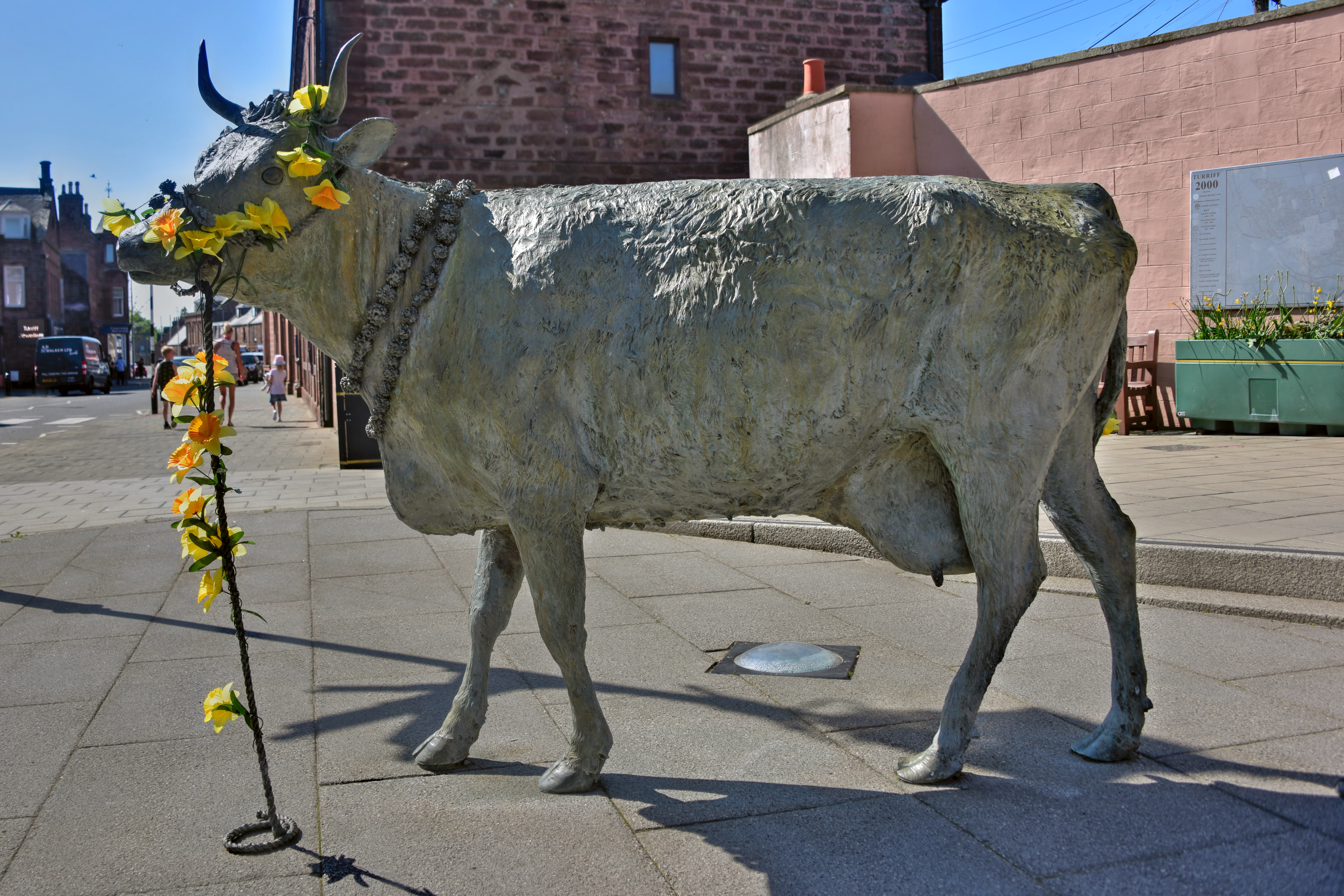
Statue commemorating the Turra Coo

The Knights Templar appear to have had a base in the area, and a nearby site is still known as "Temple Brae".

In 1273, the Earl of Buchan founded the Hospital of St Congan for a master, six chaplains and thirteen poor husbandmen of Buchan, though it is believed to have been in ruins before the time of the Reformation. These can be seen in the east gable of today's Episcopal church.

In 1512, Turriff became Burgh of Barony with two fairs — Lammas Fair and St Congan's Fair — and founded a grammar school.

Turriff's mercat cross, a red sandstone octagonal pillar, was built before 1557. Its base was widened by James Duncan in 1865, with sculpture by Thomas Goodwillie. It had an iron railing around it in the 19th century.

An earlier St Congan's church, now ruined, is medieval in date. Its eastern tower remains, capped with a richly-carved 1635 double bellcote. The kirk's bell is dated 1556, and the clock (made in Carnoustie) dates from 1797. It was still working as of 1990. Demolition in the 19th century exposed a brightly coloured fresco of St Ninian on a white background in the splay of a window in the southern wall of the church.

There is a record of a courtyard house (probably of the 17th century), known as Castle Rainy, which was used for a time as the town hall, in Castlegate until the late 19th century.

Turriff was notable as the scene of the first engagements of the Wars of the Three Kingdoms (1639–51). Early in 1639, the Marquis of Huntly assembled his forces here, and thereafter went to Kintore in lower Aberdeenshire, eventually marching from there to Aberdeen itself. The Marquis — being informed shortly after his arrival in Aberdeen that a meeting of Covenanters was to be held in Turriff on the fourteenth of February — resolved to disperse them, by occupying the town with 2000 men. The incident was known as the "Raid of Turriff" and was followed a few days later by a minor engagement at nearby Towie Barclay Castle known as the "Trot of Turriff".

By 1796, said historian Charles McKean, "the character of the town was set". "There were over double the number of ale and whisky houses than there were butchers," he added.

Turriff prospered in the Victorian era through agriculture, as evidenced by its solid red sandstone suburbs, and became known for its role as the centre of feeing for Buchan farm labourers.

More recently, the 1913 Turra Coo incident in the parish was the result of a local refusal to pay National Insurance when this was introduced by Lloyd George's government. Sheriff's officers seized a cow from a local farmer who refused to pay National Insurance contributions for his workers. The officers had difficulty selling the cow, as locals were sympathetic toward the farmer. Eventually they brought in an outside auctioneer, but the auction was disrupted by protesters and the cow escaped. A statue of the "coo" was erected in 2010 in the town centre at the junction of High Street and Main Street and has become a popular emblem for the town.

Historically, Turriff was an important centre for agricultural trade, with its mart being mentioned in the mid-19th century Second Statistical Account of Scotland as one of the largest in the country. The mart finally ceased operation in December 1989, having been eclipsed by the newer Thainstone Mart at Inverurie. At one time the town was served by Turriff station on Banff, Macduff and Turriff Junction Railway.

The town was never fortified.

== Geography ==
The town is enclosed by the rivers or burns of Putachie, Knockie and Turriff.

== Notable residents ==
- Gordon Duncan, composer and bagpiper
- George Findlater, recipient of the Victoria Cross
- Charles Reid, photographer
- Alexander Allan Shand was born in Turriff
- Turra Coo, cow involved in National Insurance protests in 1913
- Archie Mair, Norwich City goalkeeper who has also played for EFL League Two team, Notts County.

== See also ==
- List of listed buildings in Turriff, Aberdeenshire

== Bibliography ==
- McKean, Charles (1990), Banff & Buchan, Royal Incorporation of Architects in Scotland, ISBN 978-1-85158-231-0
