= List of listed buildings in Macduff, Aberdeenshire =

This is a list of listed buildings in the parish of Macduff in Aberdeenshire, Scotland.

== List ==
Name	Location	Date Listed	Grid Ref. (Note: Sometimes known as OSGB36, the grid reference (where provided) is based on the British national grid reference system used by the Ordnance Survey. • "Guide to National Grid". Ordnance Survey. • "Get-a-map". Ordnance Survey.)	Geo-coordinates	Notes	LB Number (Note: Historic Environment Scotland assign a unique alphanumeric identifier to each designated site in Scotland, for listed buildings this always begins with "LB", for example "LB12345".)	Image
18, 19 Shore Street, Clydesdale Bank, Walled Garden And Rear Outbuilding				57°40′11″N 2°29′53″W	Category B	37635	Upload Photo
2 Crook O'Ness Street				57°40′16″N 2°29′51″W	Category C(S)	37620	Upload Photo
7, 9, 11 Union Road And Rear Yard With Outbuildings				57°40′07″N 2°30′11″W	Category B	37640	Upload Photo
Doune, Fairs Cottage				57°39′36″N 2°30′41″W	Category B	37623	Upload Photo
31 Duff Street				57°40′12″N 2°29′46″W	Category B	37625	Upload Photo
Nicol's Brae				57°40′13″N 2°29′52″W	Category C(S)	37633	Upload Photo
The Knowes, War Memorial				57°40′04″N 2°29′48″W	Category B	37631	Upload Photo
Skene Street, Manor House Including Summerhouse, Boundary Walls And Railings				57°40′14″N 2°29′31″W	Category C(S)	50913	Upload Photo
5 West Skene Street				57°40′19″N 2°29′40″W	Category C(S)	37643	Upload Photo
Church Street, Doune Church Of Scotland, Church Cottage And Burial Ground				57°40′05″N 2°30′08″W	Category B	37616	Upload Photo
41 Duff Street, Craigdhu And Garden Walls				57°40′12″N 2°29′44″W	Category B	37626	Upload Photo
61 Duff Street, Gardner Church Of Scotland (Former Free Church)				57°40′10″N 2°29′40″W	Category B	37627	Upload Photo
75, 77, 79 Duff Street				57°40′07″N 2°29′35″W	Category C(S)	37629	Upload Photo
Manner Street Mill				57°40′16″N 2°29′23″W	Category B	37632	Upload Photo
17 Shore Street, Town Hall				57°40′10″N 2°29′54″W	Category B	37634	Upload another image
Tarlair Wellhouse, Well Of Tarlair				57°40′16″N 2°28′30″W	Category C(S)	37636	Upload Photo
Church Street, Burgh Cross				57°40′06″N 2°30′09″W	Category B	37617	Upload Photo
27 Crook O'Ness Street, Yard And Office				57°40′19″N 2°29′42″W	Category B	37618	Upload Photo
4 Crook O'Ness Street, Macduff Arms				57°40′17″N 2°29′50″W	Category C(S)	37621	Upload Photo
30, 32 Crook O'Ness Street				57°40′17″N 2°29′43″W	Category C(S)	37622	Upload Photo
1, 2, 3 West Skene Street				57°40′19″N 2°29′42″W	Category C(S)	37641	Upload Photo
Duff Street, Bodie Fountain				57°40′09″N 2°29′37″W	Category C(S)	37628	Upload Photo
10 High Shore				57°40′18″N 2°29′29″W	Category B	37630	Upload Photo
1 Union Road				57°40′08″N 2°30′06″W	Category B	37637	Upload Photo
3 Union Road				57°40′08″N 2°30′07″W	Category B	37638	Upload Photo
4 West Skene Street				57°40′19″N 2°29′41″W	Category C(S)	37642	Upload Photo
29 Crook O'Ness Street, Rosedale And Walled Gardens				57°40′18″N 2°29′41″W	Category B	37619	Upload Photo
Doune, Hill Of Doune, Temple Of Venus				57°39′46″N 2°30′30″W	Category B	37624	Upload Photo

== Key ==
The scheme for classifying buildings in Scotland is:

- Category A: "buildings of national or international importance, either architectural or historic; or fine, little-altered examples of some particular period, style or building type."
- Category B: "buildings of regional or more than local importance; or major examples of some particular period, style or building type, which may have been altered."
- Category C: "buildings of local importance; lesser examples of any period, style, or building type, as originally constructed or moderately altered; and simple traditional buildings which group well with other listed buildings."

In March 2016 there were 47,288 listed buildings in Scotland. Of these, 8% were Category A, and 50% were Category B, with the remaining 42% being Category C.

== See also ==
- List of listed buildings in Aberdeenshire
