= Macduff Town Hall =

Municipal building in Macduff, Scotland

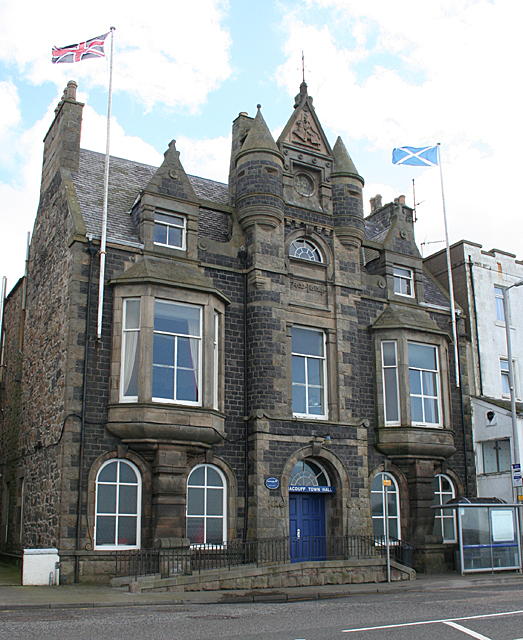
- Macduff Town Hall

- Shown in Aberdeenshire
- 57.6696°N 2.4984°W
- Location: Shore Street, Macduff

History
- Built: 1885; 141 years ago

Site notes
- Architect(s): John Bridgeford Pirie and Arthur Clyne
- Architectural style: Scottish baronial style

Listed Building – Category B
- Official name: 17 Shore Street, Town Hall
- Designated: 22 February 1972
- Reference no.: LB37634

Macduff Town Hall is a municipal building in Shore Street, Macduff, Aberdeenshire, Scotland. The structure, which was the meeting place of Macduff Burgh Council, is a Category B listed building.

== History ==
The first municipal building in Macduff was an early 19th century townhouse in Shore Street. Following significant population growth, largely associated with the fishing industry, the town became a police burgh in 1853. In the 1880s, the police commissioners decided to demolish the old townhouse and erect a new building in its place.

The new building was designed by John Bridgeford Pirie and Arthur Clyne in the Scottish baronial style, built in ashlar stone and completed in 1885. The design involved a symmetrical main frontage with three bays facing onto Shore Street; the central bay, which slightly projected forward, featured a doorway with a fanlight on the ground floor, a sash window on the first floor and a Diocletian window with a blind oculus above at attic level. The central bay was flanked at attic level by bartizans with conical-shaped roofs and surmounted with a gable containing a carving of a knight on horseback. The outer bays featured pairs of round headed windows on the ground floor, oriel windows on the first floor and gabled dormer windows at attic level. The carving of a knight on horseback was a reproduction of an image which had been carved on the local market cross when it was erected in 1783. Internally, the principal rooms were the council chamber and the main assembly hall.

The town was advanced to the status of small burgh with the town hall as its headquarters in 1930. The building continued to serve as the headquarters of the burgh council for much of the 20th century but ceased to be the local seat of government when the enlarged Banff and Buchan District Council was formed in 1975. The town hall continued to function as an events venue and performers on tour in the 1990s included the celtic music band The Boys of the Lough. The town hall has also seen important political events: on 6 May 1999, in the first elections to the Scottish Parliament, Alex Salmond spent much of the night at the town hall with his wife, Moira, before being elected Member of the Scottish Parliament for Banff and Buchan.

== See also ==
- List of listed buildings in Macduff, Aberdeenshire
