= Banff Sheriff Court =

Courthouse in Banff, Scotland

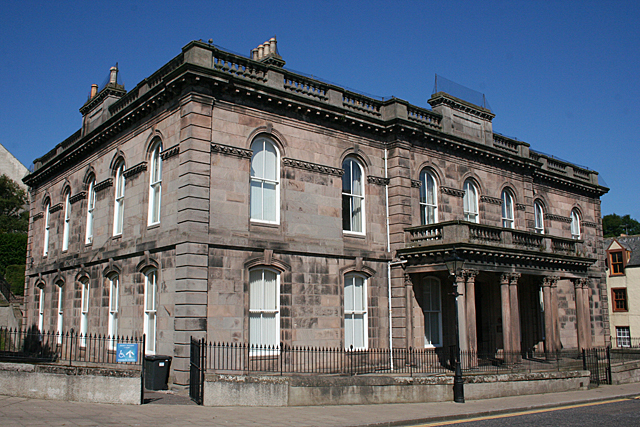
- Banff Sheriff Court

- Shown in Aberdeenshire
- 57.6631°N 2.5219°W
- Location: Low Street, Banff

History
- Built: 1871

Site notes
- Architect: James Matthews
- Architectural style: Italianate style

Listed Building – Category B
- Official name: Banff Sheriff Court and Justice of the Peace Court, including boundary walls and railings, Low Street, Banff
- Designated: 22 February 1972
- Reference no.: LB22039

Banff Sheriff Court is a judicial structure in Low Street, Banff, Aberdeenshire, Scotland. The structure, which was the meeting place of Banffshire County Council and was also used as a courthouse, is a Category B listed building.

== History ==
Originally, court hearings in Banffshire were held in a tolbooth which was built on the west side of Low Street, on the corner with Strait Path, in the early 16th century. From the late 18th century, court hearings were held in the newly-built Town House. In the mid-19th century it became necessary to commission a dedicated courthouse: the site the sheriff selected was occupied by a private house known as "Little Fillicap", which had been the home of Katharine Innes, Lady Gight, who was periodically visited there by her grandson, George Gordon Byron, who later became Lord Byron.

The courthouse was designed by James Matthews in the Italianate style, built by John Drysdale and Sons in ashlar stone at a cost of £7,214 and was officially opened by sheriff-substitute, James Gordon, on 28 January 1871. The design involved a symmetrical main frontage with seven bays facing onto Low Street. The central section of three bays, which was slightly projected forward, featured a three-bay single-storey portico formed by four pairs of Corinthian order columns supporting an entablature surmounted by a balustrade. On the first floor, the central section featured three round headed windows with keystones and architraves, while the outer bays were fenestrated with segmental headed windows on the ground floor and by round headed windows on the first floor, all with keystones and architraves. Internally, the principal room was a double-height courtroom.

Following the implementation of the Local Government (Scotland) Act 1889, which established county councils in every county, the new county leaders needed to identify a meeting place for Banffshire County Council. A large room on the first floor of the building served as the council chamber.

The county council initially established its offices at 8 Low Street, opposite the sheriff court. In 1934 they bought St Leonard's House on Sandyhill Road, converting that to be their main offices instead. Council meetings continued to be held at the sheriff court.

Banffshire County Council was abolished in 1975. The council chamber within the sheriff court then served as the meeting place of Banff and Buchan District Council from 1975 until its abolition in 1996. Between 1996 and 2020 the council chamber was also used for area committees of Aberdeenshire Council; area committee meetings since 2020 have been held virtually.

The building's primary function remains as a courthouse. The courtroom continues to be used for hearings of the sheriff's court and, on one day a month, for hearings of the justice of the peace court.

== See also ==
- List of listed buildings in Banff, Aberdeenshire
