= Macduff Marine Aquarium =

Aquarium in Aberdeenshire, Scotland

Coordinates: 57.6720°N 2.4917°W

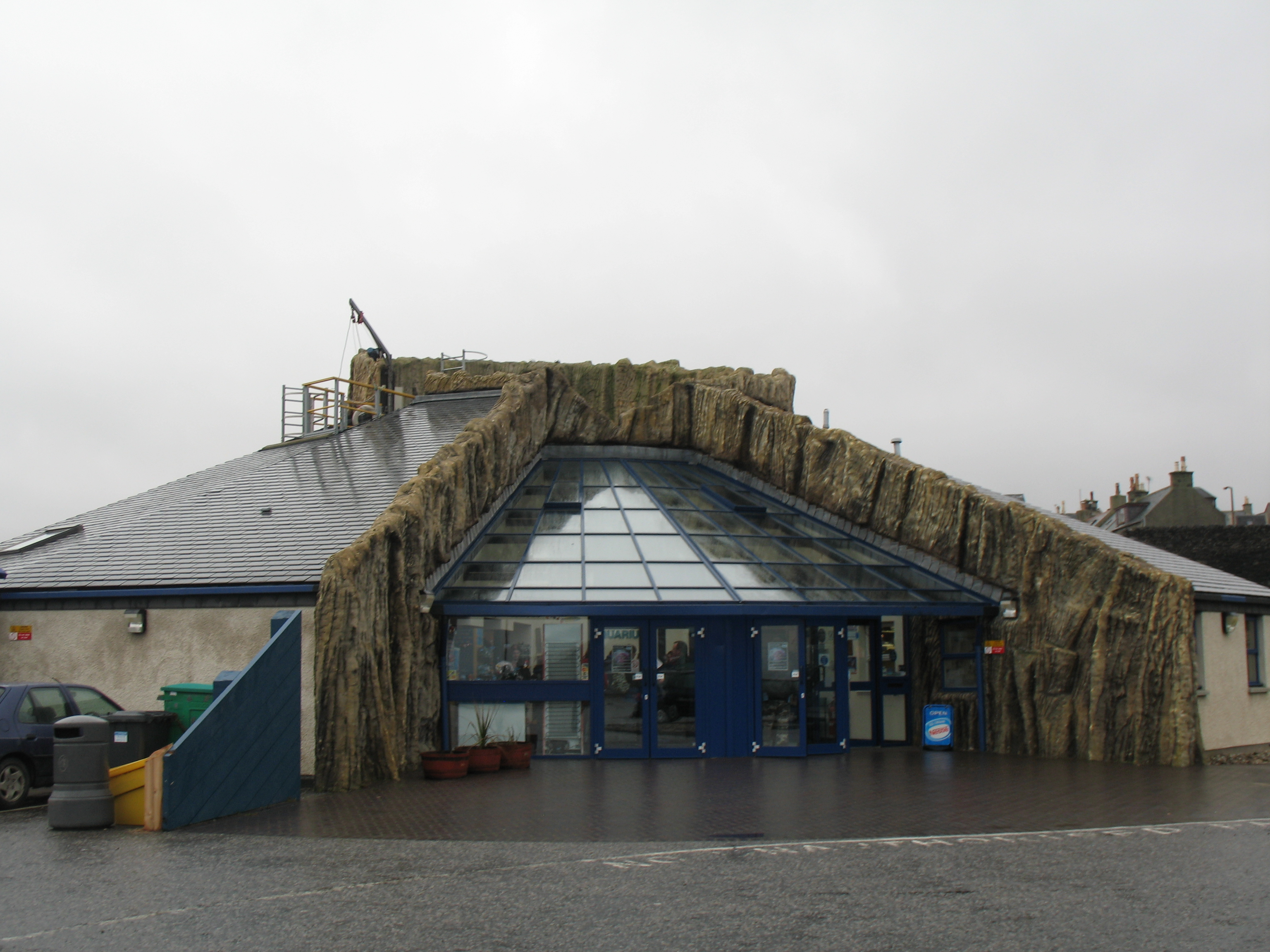
The aquarium in 2007

Macduff Marine Aquarium is an aquarium in Macduff, Scotland. It opened on 18 April 1997.

In 2017, the aquarium closed to allow the main tank to be drained and repaired. In 2023, Aberdeenshire Council announced that its bid for funding from the Levelling Up Fund had been successful. The aquarium was due to be expanded with a second storey added containing a cafe.

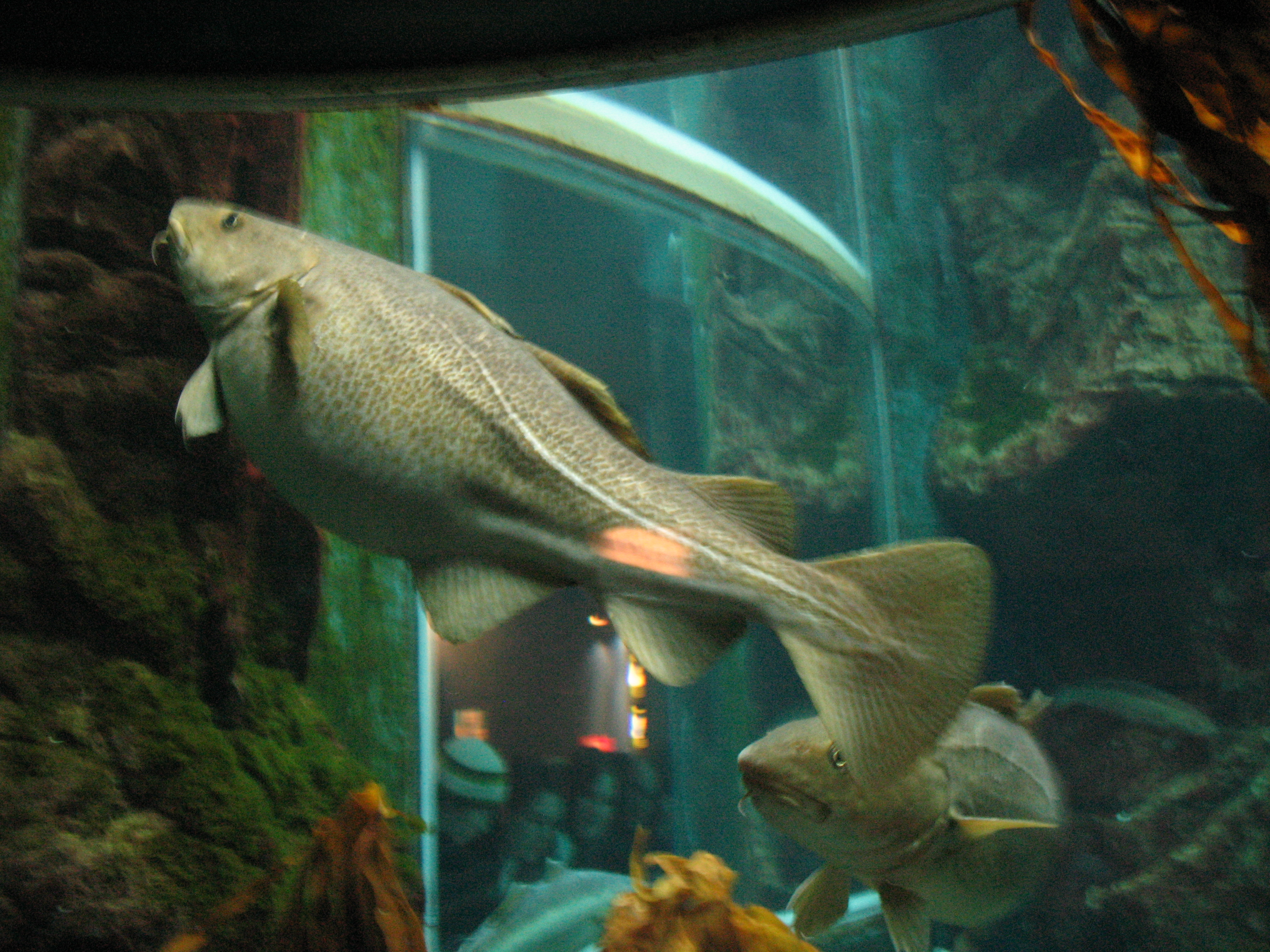
Cod
