= List of listed buildings in Banff, Aberdeenshire =

This is a list of listed buildings in the parish of Banff in Aberdeenshire, Scotland.

== List ==
Name	Location	Date Listed	Grid Ref. (Note: Sometimes known as OSGB36, the grid reference (where provided) is based on the British national grid reference system used by the Ordnance Survey. • "Guide to National Grid". Ordnance Survey. • "Get-a-map". Ordnance Survey.)	Geo-coordinates	Notes	LB Number (Note: Historic Environment Scotland assign a unique alphanumeric identifier to each designated site in Scotland, for listed buildings this always begins with "LB", for example "LB12345".)	Image
11, 12 Sandyhill Road				57°39′42″N 2°31′28″W	Category C(S)	22085	Upload Photo
13 Sandyhill Road and Rear Garden Wall				57°39′42″N 2°31′28″W	Category C(S)	22086	Upload Photo
1, 3 Strait Path				57°39′53″N 2°31′19″W	Category C(S)	22105	Upload Photo
Water Path, Path House Garden Walls				57°39′56″N 2°31′21″W	Category B	22110	Upload Photo
3 Water Path				57°39′55″N 2°31′17″W	Category B	22112	Upload Photo
68, 70 Castle Street and Rear Courtyard Walls				57°40′06″N 2°31′25″W	Category C(S)	21963	Upload Photo
19 Clunie Street, former Free School				57°40′07″N 2°31′31″W	Category B	21975	Upload Photo
11 Deveronside				57°40′00″N 2°31′15″W	Category B	21983	Upload Photo
Duff House Walled Garden				57°39′45″N 2°31′13″W	Category B	21989	Upload Photo
1 George Street and Garden Walls				57°40′04″N 2°31′25″W	Category B	21996	Upload Photo
High Street, The Cottage, St Brandon's Close				57°39′48″N 2°31′22″W	Category C(S)	22026	Upload Photo
40 High Street, Royal Bank Of Scotland				57°39′54″N 2°31′23″W	Category B	22034	Upload Photo
Low Street, Court				57°39′47″N 2°31′19″W	Category B	22039	Upload another image
31, 33 Low Street				57°39′51″N 2°31′20″W	Category C(S)	22045	Upload Photo
43, 45, 47 Low Street and Rear Garden Walls				57°39′52″N 2°31′20″W	Category B	22047	Upload Photo
49, 51 Low Street, Clydesdale Bank				57°39′52″N 2°31′20″W	Category B	22048	Upload Photo
28 Low Street (with 48 Bridge Street)				57°39′50″N 2°31′17″W	Category C(S)	22059	Upload Photo
3 Old Castlegate				57°39′54″N 2°31′24″W	Category C(S)	22065	Upload Photo
7 Old Castlegate				57°39′55″N 2°31′23″W	Category C(S)	22067	Upload Photo
Old Market Place, Former Smithy				57°39′52″N 2°31′04″W	Category B	22072	Upload Photo
5, 6 Sandyhill Road and Rear Garden Wall				57°39′44″N 2°31′27″W	Category C(S)	22081	Upload Photo
6 Back Path and Garden Walls				57°39′48″N 2°31′22″W	Category B	21878	Upload Photo
4, 6 Boyndie Street				57°39′54″N 2°31′26″W	Category B	21887	Upload Photo
13, 15 Bridge Street				57°39′51″N 2°31′10″W	Category C(S)	21898	Upload Photo
41-47 (Odd Nos) Bridge Street				57°39′50″N 2°31′15″W	Category C(S)	21900	Upload Photo
8 Bridge Street				57°39′52″N 2°31′09″W	Category C(S)	21903	Upload Photo
13 Campbell Street				57°40′09″N 2°31′41″W	Category C(S)	21916	Upload Photo
5 Carmelite Street				57°39′54″N 2°31′17″W	Category C(S)	21928	Upload Photo
29 Castle Street and rear Garden Walls				57°39′59″N 2°31′26″W	Category B	21940	Upload Photo
37 Castle Street, Seafield House				57°40′01″N 2°31′27″W	Category B	21942	Upload Photo
47 Castle Street, Castle Bar and Garden Walls				57°40′03″N 2°31′26″W	Category C(S)	21945	Upload Photo
South Colleonard with Urns, Gates and Gatepiers				57°39′10″N 2°33′39″W	Category A	6662	Upload Photo
17 Sandyhill Road				57°39′41″N 2°31′30″W	Category C(S)	22088	Upload Photo
Seafield Street, Methodist Church				57°40′01″N 2°31′31″W	Category C(S)	22093	Upload Photo
1 St Catherine Street, St Catherine's				57°40′04″N 2°31′26″W	Category A	22098	Upload Photo
4 Water Path				57°39′55″N 2°31′16″W	Category B	22113	Upload Photo
62, 64 Castle Street				57°40′05″N 2°31′25″W	Category C(S)	21961	Upload Photo
27 Clunie Street				57°40′07″N 2°31′34″W	Category C(S)	21977	Upload Photo
Clunie Street, Chalmers Hospital (original building only)				57°40′08″N 2°31′28″W	Category B	21978	Upload another image
Duff House				57°39′31″N 2°31′12″W	Category A	21985	Upload another image
Duff House Mausoleum				57°39′15″N 2°32′14″W	Category A	21988	Upload another image
11 Fife Street and rear Garden Walls				57°40′05″N 2°31′33″W	Category B	21993	Upload Photo
13 Fife Street and Rear Garden Walls				57°40′06″N 2°31′33″W	Category B	21994	Upload Photo
3 George Street				57°40′04″N 2°31′23″W	Category C(S)	21998	Upload Photo
Harbour Place, The Vaults				57°40′05″N 2°31′21″W	Category C(S)	22001	Upload Photo
1 High Shore				57°39′54″N 2°31′16″W	Category A	22004	Upload Photo
High Shore, Banff Police Station and Garden Wall				57°39′57″N 2°31′16″W	Category B	22009	Upload Photo
29, 31 High Street				57°39′49″N 2°31′24″W	Category B	22018	Upload Photo
High Street, Banff Museum and Library				57°39′49″N 2°31′23″W	Category C(S)	22024	Upload Photo
High Street, Episcopal Rectory and Front Railings				57°39′51″N 2°31′23″W	Category B	22030	Upload Photo
30, 32 High Street				57°39′51″N 2°31′23″W	Category B	22032	Upload Photo
1 Institution Terrace				57°39′46″N 2°31′26″W	Category B	22036	Upload Photo
15, 17 Low Street				57°39′49″N 2°31′18″W	Category B	22042	Upload Photo
6 Low Street				57°39′47″N 2°31′16″W	Category C(S)	22055	Upload Photo
8-16 (Even Nos) Low Street, (former Fife Arms), Fife House				57°39′48″N 2°31′17″W	Category A	22056	Upload Photo
20, 22 Low Street				57°39′49″N 2°31′17″W	Category C(S)	22057	Upload Photo
34 Low Street, Townhouse				57°39′52″N 2°31′17″W	Category A	22063	Upload another image
8 Sandyhill Road				57°39′43″N 2°31′27″W	Category C(S)	22082	Upload Photo
1 Back Path, Trevona				57°39′48″N 2°31′18″W	Category C(S)	21875	Upload Photo
3, 4, 5 Back Path and Garden Walls				57°39′48″N 2°31′20″W	Category B	21877	Upload Photo
8 Back Path and 18 High Street				57°39′48″N 2°31′23″W	Category B	21880	Upload Photo
8 And 9 Braeheads				57°40′08″N 2°31′25″W	Category C(S)	21892	Upload Photo
42, 44 Bridge Street				57°39′51″N 2°31′16″W	Category C(S)	21908	Upload Photo
17 Campbell Street				57°40′08″N 2°31′42″W	Category C(S)	21918	Upload Photo
9 Carmelite Street				57°39′54″N 2°31′16″W	Category B	21929	Upload Photo
41, 43 Castle Street				57°40′02″N 2°31′26″W	Category C(S)	21944	Upload Photo
83 Castle Street Old Brewery				57°40′10″N 2°31′27″W	Category B	21952	Upload Photo
6 Castle Street				57°40′02″N 2°31′26″W	Category B	21954	Upload Photo
Beechgrove, (Former Ord Church Of Scotland) and War Memorial				57°36′47″N 2°37′57″W	Category C(S)	3047	Upload Photo
Eagles Gate Lodge, Gatepiers and Quadrant Walls				57°38′36″N 2°33′07″W	Category C(S)	3048	Upload Photo
Inchdrewer Castle				57°38′06″N 2°34′40″W	Category A	3049	Upload another image
Lower Inchdrewer				57°38′19″N 2°34′26″W	Category B	3051	Upload Photo
Seafield Street, Kingswell Nursery School				57°40′02″N 2°31′45″W	Category C(S)	22097	Upload Photo
7 St Catherine Street				57°40′04″N 2°31′29″W	Category B	22101	Upload Photo
11 St Catherine Street				57°40′04″N 2°31′31″W	Category C(S)	22103	Upload Photo
8,10 Strait Path				57°39′53″N 2°31′21″W	Category C(S)	22108	Upload Photo
3 Church Street				57°39′55″N 2°31′11″W	Category C(S)	21970	Upload Photo
1 Clunie Street				57°40′07″N 2°31′27″W	Category C(S)	21972	Upload Photo
5 Clunie Street, Royston				57°40′07″N 2°31′28″W	Category B	21974	Upload Photo
6 Deveronside, 30A, 32A High Shore				57°39′58″N 2°31′15″W	Category C(S)	21980	Upload another image
7, 8 Deveronside, Ship Inn				57°39′59″N 2°31′15″W	Category C(S)	21981	Upload Photo
Duff House, Fife Gates				57°39′27″N 2°31′32″W	Category B	21986	Upload Photo
Duff House Icehouse				57°39′16″N 2°31′45″W	Category C(S)	21987	Upload another image
1 Fife Street				57°40′04″N 2°31′33″W	Category B	21990	Upload Photo
5, 7 Fife Street				57°40′05″N 2°31′33″W	Category C(S)	21992	Upload Photo
16 Fife Street and 21 Clunie Street				57°40′07″N 2°31′32″W	Category C(S)	21995	Upload Photo
High Shore, Old St Mary's Burial Ground and Railings				57°39′55″N 2°31′14″W	Category A	22003	Upload Photo
21 High Shore, Shore House and Garden Walls				57°39′57″N 2°31′16″W	Category C(S)	22010	Upload Photo
39 High Street				57°39′50″N 2°31′25″W	Category B	22020	Upload Photo
High Street, St Brandon's Close				57°39′49″N 2°31′22″W	Category B	22025	Upload Photo
Low Street, Collie Lodge with Lamp Standards				57°39′46″N 2°31′21″W	Category B	22038	Upload Photo
4, 4A Low Street				57°39′47″N 2°31′17″W	Category B	22054	Upload Photo
36, 38 Low Street and 2 Carmelite Street				57°39′52″N 2°31′17″W	Category B	22064	Upload Photo
8 Old Castlegate, St Ninians and Garden Walls				57°39′55″N 2°31′22″W	Category B	22070	Upload Photo
9 Boyndie Street, Boyndie House				57°39′54″N 2°31′26″W	Category B	21884	Upload Photo
13 Boyndie Street				57°39′54″N 2°31′28″W	Category B	21886	Upload Photo
49, 51, 53 Bridge Street				57°39′50″N 2°31′16″W	Category B	21901	Upload Photo
11 Campbell Street				57°40′09″N 2°31′41″W	Category C(S)	21915	Upload Photo
15 Campbell Street				57°40′08″N 2°31′41″W	Category C(S)	21917	Upload Photo
1, 1A Carmelite Street				57°39′53″N 2°31′17″W	Category C(S)	21927	Upload Photo
16, 18 Carmelite Street				57°39′53″N 2°31′15″W	Category B	21932	Upload Photo
39 Castle Street, Winston House				57°40′02″N 2°31′26″W	Category C(S)	21943	Upload Photo
49, 51 Castle Street				57°40′04″N 2°31′26″W	Category C(S)	21946	Upload Photo
12, 14, 16 Castle Street Elm Bank				57°39′57″N 2°31′23″W	Category C(S)	21956	Upload Photo
14, 15 Sandyhill Road				57°39′41″N 2°31′29″W	Category C(S)	22087	Upload Photo
Seafield Street, Mansefield				57°40′01″N 2°31′31″W	Category C(S)	22094	Upload Photo
St Catherine Street, Jail Walls				57°40′04″N 2°31′34″W	Category C(S)	22104	Upload Photo
2 Water Path, Ingleneuk House Garden Walls and Garden Summer House				57°39′55″N 2°31′18″W	Category A	22111	Upload Photo
66, 66A Castle Street				57°40′05″N 2°31′25″W	Category C(S)	21962	Upload Photo
86 Castle Street				57°40′08″N 2°31′25″W	Category B	21967	Upload Photo
94 Castle Street and Rear Garden Wall				57°40′10″N 2°31′25″W	Category C(S)	21968	Upload Photo
Church Street, House incorporated into Banff Tyre Service Premises				57°39′54″N 2°31′06″W	Category C(S)	21971	Upload Photo
7 Coldhome Street, Chapelhome including Garden Wall				57°40′07″N 2°31′39″W	Category C(S)	21979	Upload Photo
5 George Street				57°40′05″N 2°31′22″W	Category C(S)	22000	Upload Photo
5 High Street				57°39′47″N 2°31′25″W	Category B	22017	Upload Photo
33, 35 High Street				57°39′50″N 2°31′25″W	Category B	22019	Upload Photo
41, 43, 45, 47 High Street and Rear Garden Walls				57°39′50″N 2°31′25″W	Category B	22021	Upload Photo
High Street, St Brandon's and Garden Walls				57°39′49″N 2°31′22″W	Category B	22027	Upload Photo
23, 25, 27 Low Street				57°39′50″N 2°31′19″W	Category B	22043	Upload Photo
55, 57, 59 Low Street				57°39′53″N 2°31′19″W	Category B	22050	Upload Photo
Low Street, Biggar Fountain				57°39′53″N 2°31′19″W	Category B	22051	Upload Photo
5 Old Castlegate				57°39′55″N 2°31′23″W	Category C(S)	22066	Upload Photo
14 Old Castlegate and Garden Walls				57°39′55″N 2°31′22″W	Category B	22071	Upload Photo
1 Old Market Place, Front Wall and Gatepiers				57°39′53″N 2°31′08″W	Category B	22073	Upload Photo
9 Old Market Place				57°39′54″N 2°31′06″W	Category B	22075	Upload Photo
11 Old Market Place				57°39′53″N 2°31′05″W	Category C(S)	22076	Upload Photo
Quayside, Banff Harbour and Pillbox				57°40′12″N 2°31′24″W	Category A	22077	Upload Photo
2 Back Path				57°39′48″N 2°31′18″W	Category C(S)	21876	Upload Photo
7 Bridge Street				57°39′51″N 2°31′09″W	Category C(S)	21896	Upload Photo
38, 40 Bridge Street				57°39′51″N 2°31′15″W	Category C(S)	21907	Upload Photo
1 Campbell Street				57°40′11″N 2°31′39″W	Category C(S)	21910	Upload Photo
5 Campbell Street				57°40′11″N 2°31′40″W	Category C(S)	21912	Upload Photo
4 Campbell Street				57°40′11″N 2°31′38″W	Category C(S)	21920	Upload Photo
12 Campbell Street				57°40′09″N 2°31′39″W	Category C(S)	21924	Upload Photo
Castle Street, Manse Of Trinity and Alvah				57°39′58″N 2°31′26″W	Category C(S)	21937	Upload Photo
31, 33, 35 Castle Street and 2 Seafield Street, Town Hall				57°40′00″N 2°31′26″W	Category A	21941	Upload Photo
53, 55 Castle Street				57°40′05″N 2°31′26″W	Category C(S)	21947	Upload Photo
57, 59 Castle Street				57°40′05″N 2°31′26″W	Category C(S)	21948	Upload Photo
77 Castle Street				57°40′07″N 2°31′26″W	Category B	21950	Upload Photo
Sandyhills Dovecote				57°39′27″N 2°32′04″W	Category B	6661	Upload Photo
22 Seafield Street, Chattonville				57°40′00″N 2°31′31″W	Category B	22096	Upload Photo
5 St Catherine Street				57°40′04″N 2°31′29″W	Category B	22100	Upload Photo
9 St Catherine Street				57°40′04″N 2°31′30″W	Category B	22102	Upload Photo
78 Castle Street				57°40′07″N 2°31′25″W	Category B	21966	Upload Photo
3 Fife Street				57°40′05″N 2°31′33″W	Category B	21991	Upload Photo
5 High Shore, Market Arms				57°39′54″N 2°31′16″W	Category B	22006	Upload Photo
11 High Shore				57°39′55″N 2°31′16″W	Category B	22008	Upload Photo
High Street, St Andrew's Episcopal Church and Front Railings				57°39′50″N 2°31′23″W	Category B	22028	Upload Photo
High Street, St Mary's Church Of Scotland				57°39′47″N 2°31′23″W	Category B	22029	Upload another image
24 High Street, Oakbank				57°39′50″N 2°31′23″W	Category C(S)	22031	Upload Photo
32 High Street, County Hotel				57°39′52″N 2°31′23″W	Category B	22033	Upload Photo
9, 11, 13 Low Street				57°39′49″N 2°31′19″W	Category B	22041	Upload Photo
6 Old Castlegate				57°39′55″N 2°31′22″W	Category B	22069	Upload Photo
3, 4 Sandyhill Road, Seafield Hotel				57°39′44″N 2°31′27″W	Category B	22080	Upload Photo
10 Sandyhill Road				57°39′42″N 2°31′28″W	Category C(S)	22084	Upload Photo
1 Braeheads				57°40′05″N 2°31′22″W	Category C(S)	21889	Upload Photo
Bridge Road, Bridge Gates House				57°39′47″N 2°30′54″W	Category B	21894	Upload Photo
2 Campbell Street				57°40′11″N 2°31′38″W	Category C(S)	21919	Upload Photo
10 Campbell Street				57°40′10″N 2°31′39″W	Category C(S)	21923	Upload Photo
19 Castle Street				57°39′56″N 2°31′26″W	Category C(S)	21934	Upload Photo
Castle Street, Banff Castle, with Flanking Pavilions, Well and Old Castle Walls				57°40′00″N 2°31′20″W	Category A	21957	Upload another image
Castle Street, Banff Castle Gate Lodges Gatepiers and Gates				57°39′59″N 2°31′24″W	Category B	21959	Upload Photo
Manse Of Ord, Strathord				57°36′52″N 2°38′01″W	Category C(S)	6660	Upload Photo
The Wrack, former Industrial Building				57°38′57″N 2°32′20″W	Category C(S)	6663	Upload Photo
Scotstown, Banff Links, former Store Building				57°40′09″N 2°32′37″W	Category C(S)	47126	Upload Photo
18 Sandyhill Road and Rear Yard Wall				57°39′40″N 2°31′31″W	Category C(S)	22089	Upload Photo
21 Seafield Street, Cape House				57°40′01″N 2°31′33″W	Category B	22095	Upload Photo
9 Strait Path, The Broken Fiddle				57°39′53″N 2°31′21″W	Category C(S)	22106	Upload another image
6 Strait Path				57°39′53″N 2°31′21″W	Category B	22107	Upload Photo
76 Castle Street				57°40′07″N 2°31′25″W	Category B	21965	Upload Photo
23, 25 Clunie Street				57°40′07″N 2°31′34″W	Category C(S)	21976	Upload Photo
10 Deveronside				57°40′00″N 2°31′15″W	Category C(S)	21982	Upload Photo
16 High Shore				57°39′56″N 2°31′15″W	Category B	22013	Upload Photo
1 High Street				57°39′46″N 2°31′25″W	Category B	22015	Upload Photo
77, 79, 81 High Street, Forbes House				57°39′53″N 2°31′25″W	Category B	22022	Upload Photo
Institution Terrace, Banff Primary School (former Banff Academy) with Lamp Standards				57°39′46″N 2°31′28″W	Category A	22035	Upload Photo
Low Street, Former New Market Archway				57°39′53″N 2°31′18″W	Category B	22052	Upload Photo
30 Low Street, Carmelite House and Front Garden Wall				57°39′51″N 2°31′17″W	Category B	22060	Upload Photo
7 Back Path				57°39′48″N 2°31′22″W	Category B	21879	Upload Photo
Bellevue Road, St Ann's Hill Garden Walls and Gatepiers				57°39′42″N 2°31′34″W	Category B	21882	Upload Photo
11 Boyndie Street, Banff Town and Country Club and Enclosing Walls				57°39′54″N 2°31′27″W	Category A	21885	Upload Photo
2 Braeheads				57°40′05″N 2°31′22″W	Category C(S)	21890	Upload Photo
1, 3, 5 Bridge Street				57°39′51″N 2°31′08″W	Category C(S)	21895	Upload Photo
2, 4 and 6 Bridge Street				57°39′52″N 2°31′08″W	Category B	21902	Upload Photo
7 Campbell Street				57°40′10″N 2°31′40″W	Category C(S)	21913	Upload Photo
16 Campbell Street				57°40′09″N 2°31′40″W	Category C(S)	21925	Upload Photo
18 Campbell Street				57°40′08″N 2°31′40″W	Category C(S)	21926	Upload Photo
2 Castle Lane				57°39′56″N 2°31′23″W	Category B	21933	Upload Photo
Castle Street Trinity and Alvah Church Halls				57°39′57″N 2°31′27″W	Category C(S)	21936	Upload Photo
61, 63 Castle Street				57°40′05″N 2°31′26″W	Category C(S)	21949	Upload Photo
Sandyhill Road, Our Lady of Mount Carmel RC Church				57°39′39″N 2°31′34″W	Category B	22090	Upload Photo
Seafield Street, Ymca Hall				57°40′01″N 2°31′28″W	Category C(S)	22092	Upload Photo
72, 74 Castle Street				57°40′06″N 2°31′25″W	Category C(S)	21964	Upload Photo
3 Clunie Street				57°40′07″N 2°31′27″W	Category C(S)	21973	Upload Photo
12 Deveronside and Garden Walls				57°40′01″N 2°31′15″W	Category B	21984	Upload Photo
2 George Street				57°40′04″N 2°31′24″W	Category C(S)	21997	Upload Photo
4 George Street				57°40′04″N 2°31′23″W	Category C(S)	21999	Upload Photo
Harbour Place, Old Customs House				57°40′06″N 2°31′21″W	Category C(S)	22002	Upload Photo
9 High Shore, Fernlee and Garden Walls				57°39′55″N 2°31′17″W	Category B	22007	Upload Photo
12 High Shore				57°39′55″N 2°31′15″W	Category C(S)	22011	Upload Photo
High Shore, Gordons Granaries				57°39′56″N 2°31′14″W	Category B	22014	Upload Photo
High Street, St Mary's Church Hall				57°39′47″N 2°31′23″W	Category C(S)	22023	Upload Photo
2 Institution Terrace				57°39′47″N 2°31′27″W	Category B	22037	Upload Photo
3, 5, 7 Low Street				57°39′48″N 2°31′19″W	Category B	22040	Upload Photo
29 Low Street, Bank of Scotland				57°39′50″N 2°31′19″W	Category B	22044	Upload Photo
35, 37, 41 Low Street				57°39′51″N 2°31′20″W	Category B	22046	Upload Photo
53 Low Street, Tolbooth Hotel and Old Jail				57°39′53″N 2°31′20″W	Category B	22049	Upload another image
2 Old Market Place, Panton House				57°39′50″N 2°31′10″W	Category B	22074	Upload Photo
7 Quayside				57°40′09″N 2°31′23″W	Category C(S)	22078	Upload Photo
9 Sandyhill Road				57°39′43″N 2°31′28″W	Category C(S)	22083	Upload Photo
Bellevue Road, Bellevue With Garden Walls, Gates and Gatepiers				57°39′40″N 2°31′33″W	Category B	21881	Upload Photo
10 Boyndie Street				57°39′53″N 2°31′28″W	Category C(S)	21888	Upload Photo
4 Braeheads, St John's Masonic Hall including Boundary Walls				57°40′06″N 2°31′23″W	Category C(S)	21891	Upload Photo
9 Bridge Street				57°39′51″N 2°31′09″W	Category C(S)	21897	Upload Photo
46 Bridge Street				57°39′51″N 2°31′16″W	Category C(S)	21909	Upload Photo
3 Campbell Street				57°40′11″N 2°31′39″W	Category C(S)	21911	Upload Photo
6 Campbell Street				57°40′10″N 2°31′39″W	Category C(S)	21921	Upload Photo
8 Campbell Street				57°40′10″N 2°31′39″W	Category C(S)	21922	Upload Photo
23, 25 Castle Street				57°39′59″N 2°31′26″W	Category B	21938	Upload Photo
79, 81 Castle Street				57°40′07″N 2°31′26″W	Category C(S)	21951	Upload Photo
8, 10 Castle Street				57°39′55″N 2°31′24″W	Category B	21955	Upload Photo
Sandyhill Road, Rc Presbytery				57°39′39″N 2°31′34″W	Category C(S)	22091	Upload Photo
3 St Catherine Street				57°40′04″N 2°31′28″W	Category B	22099	Upload Photo
Water Path, Path House and Path Cottage				57°39′56″N 2°31′21″W	Category B	22109	Upload Photo
Castle Street, War Memorial				57°40′01″N 2°31′25″W	Category B	21960	Upload Photo
96 Castle Street, Railway Inn				57°40′10″N 2°31′25″W	Category B	21969	Upload another image
3 High Shore				57°39′54″N 2°31′16″W	Category B	22005	Upload Photo
14 High Shore				57°39′55″N 2°31′15″W	Category B	22012	Upload Photo
3 High Street				57°39′47″N 2°31′25″W	Category B	22016	Upload Photo
2 Low Street				57°39′46″N 2°31′17″W	Category B	22053	Upload Photo
24 And 26 Low Street and 55 Bridge Street				57°39′50″N 2°31′17″W	Category C(S)	22058	Upload Photo
32 Low Street				57°39′51″N 2°31′17″W	Category C(S)	22061	Upload Photo
Low Street, Tolbooth Steeple				57°39′52″N 2°31′17″W	Category A	22062	Upload another image
2 Old Castlegate and Rear Garden Wall				57°39′54″N 2°31′23″W	Category B	22068	Upload Photo
Quayside, Warehouse				57°40′10″N 2°31′24″W	Category C(S)	22079	Upload Photo
5, 7, 7A Boyndie Street				57°39′54″N 2°31′26″W	Category B	21883	Upload Photo
Bridge Of Banff over River Deveron				57°39′46″N 2°30′48″W	Category A	21893	Upload another image
39 Bridge Street				57°39′50″N 2°31′15″W	Category C(S)	21899	Upload Photo
10 Bridge Street, Royal Oak Hotel				57°39′51″N 2°31′11″W	Category C(S)	21904	Upload Photo
28, 30, 32 Bridge Street				57°39′51″N 2°31′14″W	Category C(S)	21905	Upload Photo
36 Bridge Street				57°39′51″N 2°31′14″W	Category B	21906	Upload Photo
9 Campbell Street				57°40′10″N 2°31′40″W	Category C(S)	21914	Upload Photo
4, 6 Carmelite Street				57°39′53″N 2°31′17″W	Category B	21930	Upload Photo
10 Carmelite Street, Former Post Office				57°39′53″N 2°31′16″W	Category B	21931	Upload Photo
Castle Street, Trinity and Alvah Church, Church Of Scotland				57°39′57″N 2°31′26″W	Category B	21935	Upload Photo
27, 27A Castle Street				57°39′59″N 2°31′26″W	Category C(S)	21939	Upload Photo
4 Castle Street				57°40′07″N 2°31′26″W	Category B	21953	Upload Photo
Castle Street, Banff Castle Enclosing Walls surrounding Policies				57°40′00″N 2°31′21″W	Category B	21958	Upload Photo
Inverboyndie, Jandar and Brandon View with Garden Walls				57°40′07″N 2°33′22″W	Category C(S)	3050	Upload Photo

== Key ==
The scheme for classifying buildings in Scotland is:

- Category A: "buildings of national or international importance, either architectural or historic; or fine, little-altered examples of some particular period, style or building type."
- Category B: "buildings of regional or more than local importance; or major examples of some particular period, style or building type, which may have been altered."
- Category C: "buildings of local importance; lesser examples of any period, style, or building type, as originally constructed or moderately altered; and simple traditional buildings which group well with other listed buildings."

In March 2016 there were 47,288 listed buildings in Scotland. Of these, 8% were Category A, and 50% were Category B, with the remaining 42% being Category C.

== See also ==
- List of listed buildings in Aberdeenshire
