= Banff Town House =

Municipal Building in Banff, Scotland

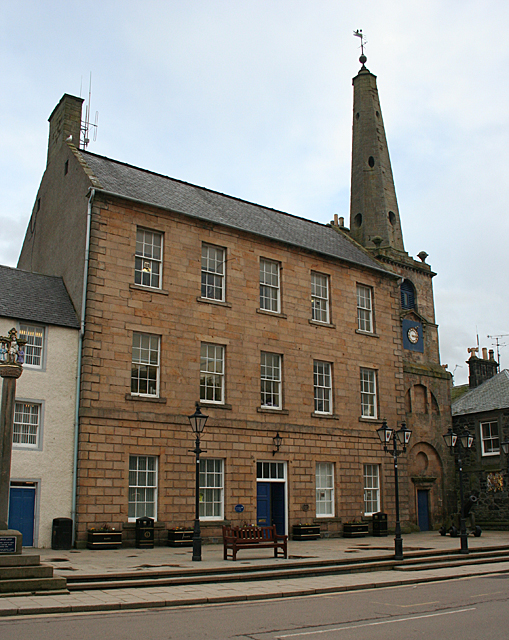
- The building in 2011

- Shown in Aberdeenshire
- 57°39′52″N 2°31′17″W
- Location: 34 Low Street, Banff, Aberdeenshire, Scotland

History
- Built: 1767 (259 years ago) (steeple); 1797 (229 years ago) (town house)

Site notes
- Architect(s): John Adam (steeple); James Reid (town house)
- Architectural style: Neoclassical style

Listed Building – Category A
- Official name: Low Street, Tolbooth Steeple
- Designated: 22 February 1972
- Reference no.: LB22062

Listed Building – Category A
- Official name: 34 Low Street, Townhouse
- Designated: 22 February 1972
- Reference no.: LB22063

Banff Town House is a municipal building in Low Street, Banff, Aberdeenshire, Scotland. The building, which is used as a customer service point and job centre, forms part of a complex consisting of a steeple, completed in 1767, which is a Category A listed building, and a town house, completed in 1797, which is also a Category A listed building.

== History ==
The first municipal building in the town was a tolbooth which was built of the west side of Low Street, on the corner with Strait Path, in the early 16th century. After the tolbooth became dilapidated the burgh leaders decided to construct a new building, the steeple, on the east side of Low Street. There were strong objections from Rear-Admiral William Gordon, who was concerned that the steeple might collapse on his property, Carmelite House, located to the south.

The steeple was designed by John Adam in the neoclassical style, built in ashlar stone by a master mason, John Marr, and was completed in 1767. The design involved a symmetrical main frontage with just one bay facing onto Low Street; the first stage involved a doorway with a cornice and a blind oculus above, the second stage incorporated a blind Diocletian window, the third stage involved a clock with a pediment, the fourth stage incorporated a round headed louvered opening and the fifth stage took the form of a hexagonal spire. The bell in the steeple was designed and cast by Lester and Pack of London.

In the late 18th century, the burgh leaders decided to augment the structure with a town house on a site to the north of the steeple. The town house was financed by public subscription and amounts subscribed included a donation of 100 guineas from the local member of parliament, Sir William Grant. The town house was designed by James Reid in the neoclassical style, built in ashlar stone at a cost of £1,700 and was completed in 1797. The design involved a symmetrical main frontage with five bays facing onto Low Street; the central bay featured a doorway with a four-light rectangular window above; the building was fenestrated with sash windows in the other bays on the ground floor and in the bays on the first and second floors. Internally, the principal rooms were a reception room on the first floor and a ballroom on the second floor. There was also an office for the sheriffs' clerk and some prison cells.

The Banff Museum was established in the town house in 1828 but then relocated to Banff Academy in 1838. Following significant population growth, largely associated with the fishing industry, Banff became a police burgh with the town house as its headquarters in 1840. The town's mercat cross was moved several times before finding a permanent home on the Plainstones, the elevated stone pavement in front of the town house, in June 1900. A Russian cannon, captured at the Siege of Sevastopol during the Crimean War and presented to the town after the war, was relocated to the Plainstones in 1901.

The town house continued in the role of burgh headquarters for much of the 20th century and continued to be the meeting place of the enlarged Banff and Buchan District Council after it was formed in 1975. It ceased to be the local seat of government after the new unitary authority, Aberdeenshire Council, was formed in Aberdeen in 1996. However, it continued to serve as the local area office of the new council. An extensive programme of refurbishment works, which created improved facilities for the local customer service point and job centre, was completed by Morrison Construction at a cost of £1.75 million in July 2015.

== Gallery ==
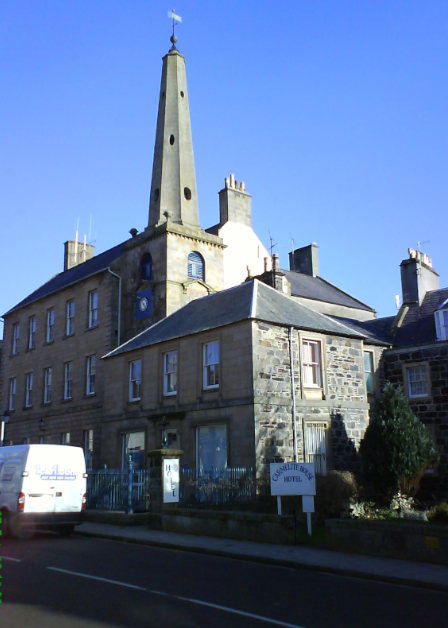
The steeple and Carmelite House

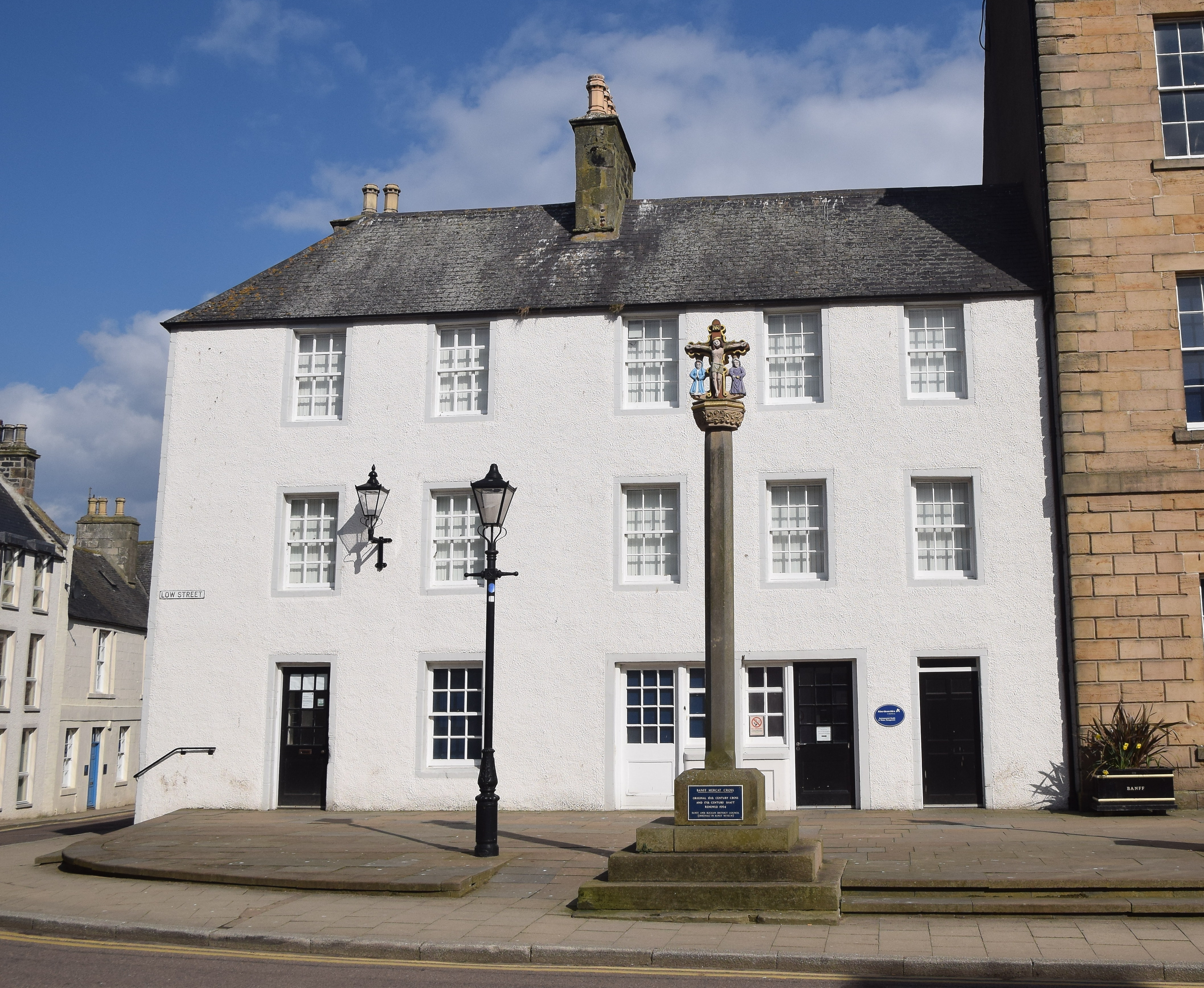
The town's mercat cross. The edge of the town house is on the right

== See also ==
- List of listed buildings in Banff, Aberdeenshire
