= Macduff, Aberdeenshire =

Town in Aberdeenshire, Scotland

Coordinates: 57.671°N 2.497°W

Macduff: Scottish Gaelic: An Dùn
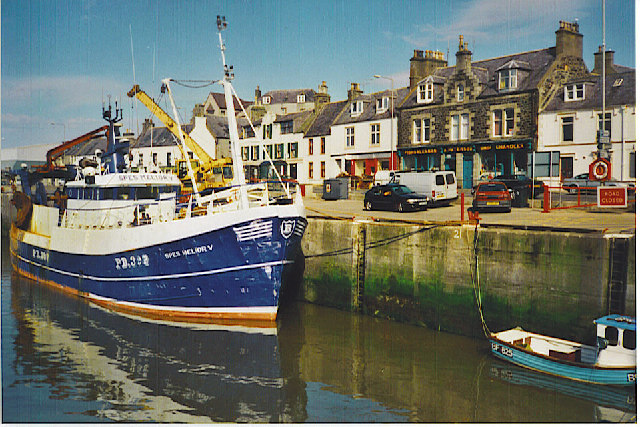
- Macduff harbour

- Location within Aberdeenshire
- Population: 3,830 (2020)
- OS grid reference: NJ704646
- Council area: Aberdeenshire
- Lieutenancy area: Banffshire
- Country: Scotland
- Sovereign state: United Kingdom
- Post town: MACDUFF
- Postcode district: AB44
- Dialling code: 01261
- Police: Scotland
- Fire: Scottish
- Ambulance: Scottish
- UK Parliament: Aberdeenshire North and Moray East
- Scottish Parliament: Banffshire and Buchan Coast

Macduff (Scottish Gaelic: An Dùn) is a town in the Banff and Buchan area of Aberdeenshire, Scotland. It is situated on Banff Bay and faces the town of Banff across the estuary of the River Deveron. Macduff is a former burgh and was the last place in the United Kingdom where deep-water wooden fishing boats were built.

== History ==
Early area prehistory is manifested by the nearby ancient monument at Longman Hill, a large long barrow somewhat to the southeast of Macduff.

The settlement of Doune (from the Scottish Gaelic dùn, "hill fort") was purchased in 1733 by William Duff, who became the first Earl Fife. In 1760, James Duff, the second earl, built a harbour there and in 1783 succeeded in raising Doune to the status of a burgh of barony, renaming it "Macduff" after his supposed ancestor. The 2nd Earl Fife appointed his factor, William Rose, as the first Provost of Macduff in 1783. The town celebrated its bicentenary in 1983, and the signs erected in that year still stand on the main approaches to the town (most visibly, a large sign next to the Banff Bridge on the Macduff side).

Banff and Macduff are separated by the valley of the River Deveron. This unpredictable river was finally tamed by the seven-arched bridge completed in 1799 by John Smeaton. An earlier bridge had been built in 1765, but was swept away in 1768. The old ferry was brought back into use, until it was lost in a flood in 1773.

In 1901 the Annual Report of the Fishery Board for Scotland states that "the much-needed harbour improvements have commenced and it is to be hoped that these, when completed, will enable fishermen to prosecute herring fishing successfully at home without having to resort to other ports. The works were completed in June 1903. In 1912, the Annual Report states: "The landings show an increase. A falling off in haddocks was made up by an increase in cod. There was an addition of three steam drifters."".

Fishery Statistics

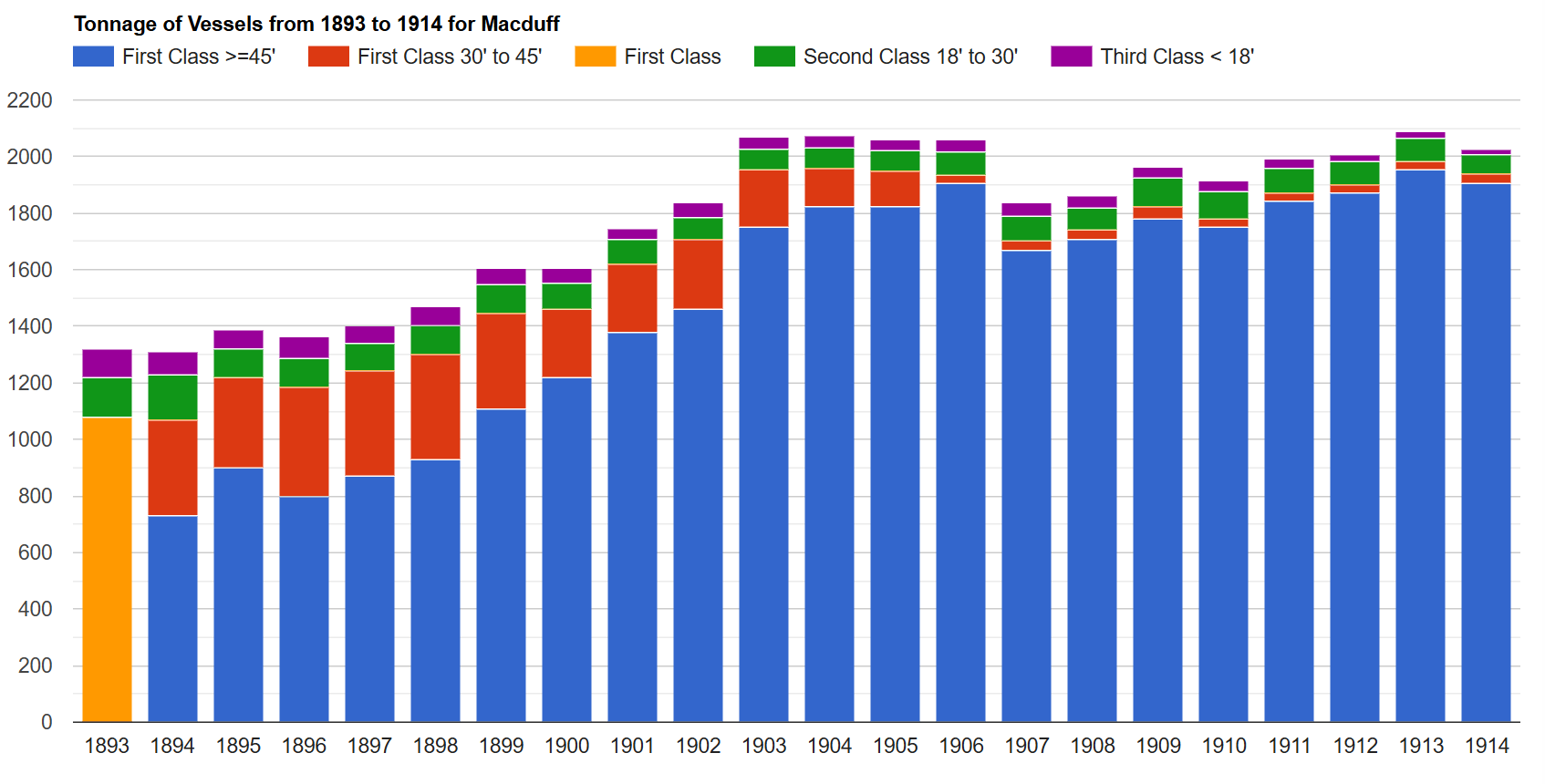
Tonnage of vessels

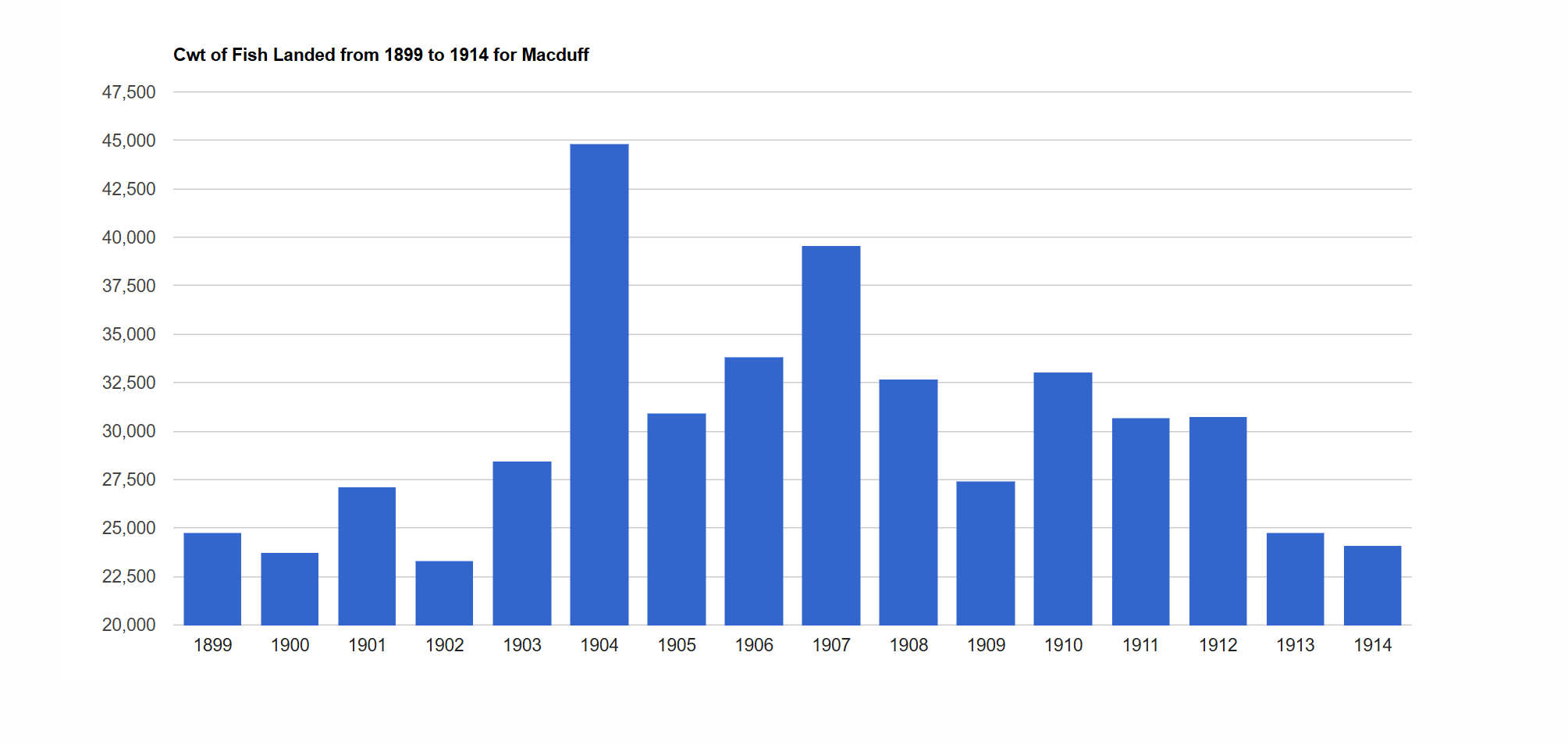
Cwt of fish landed

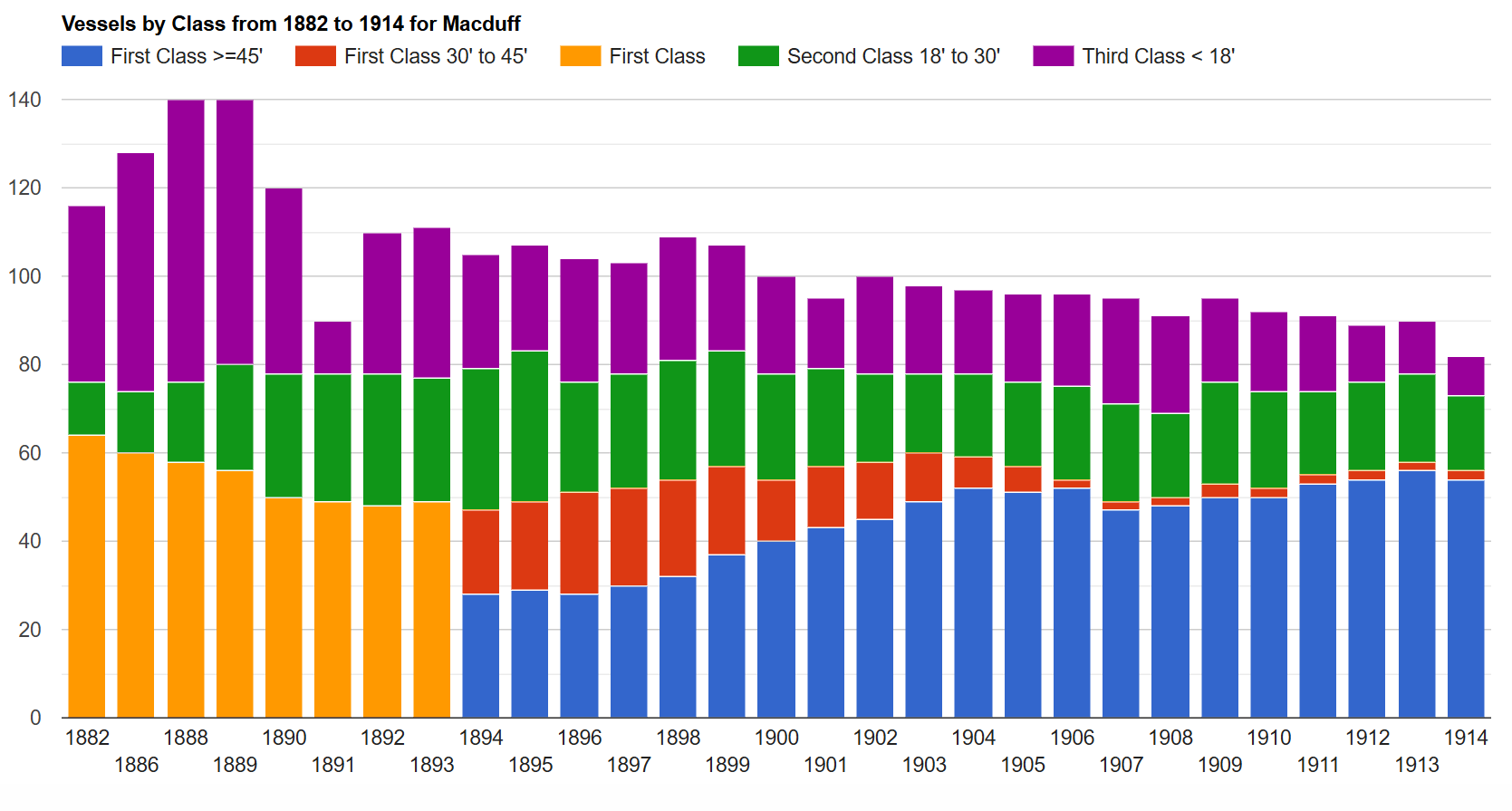
Vessels by class

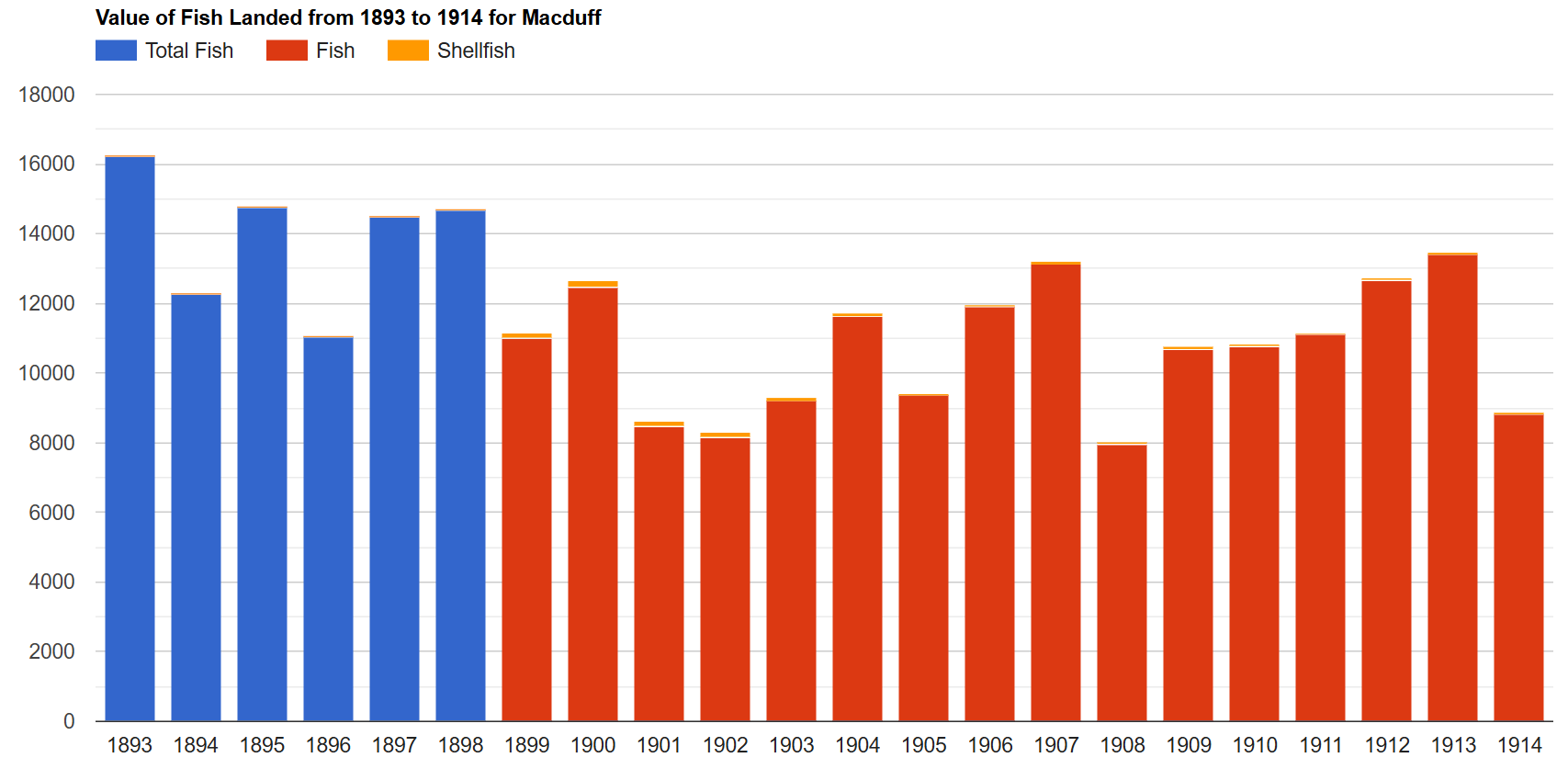
Value (£) of fish landed

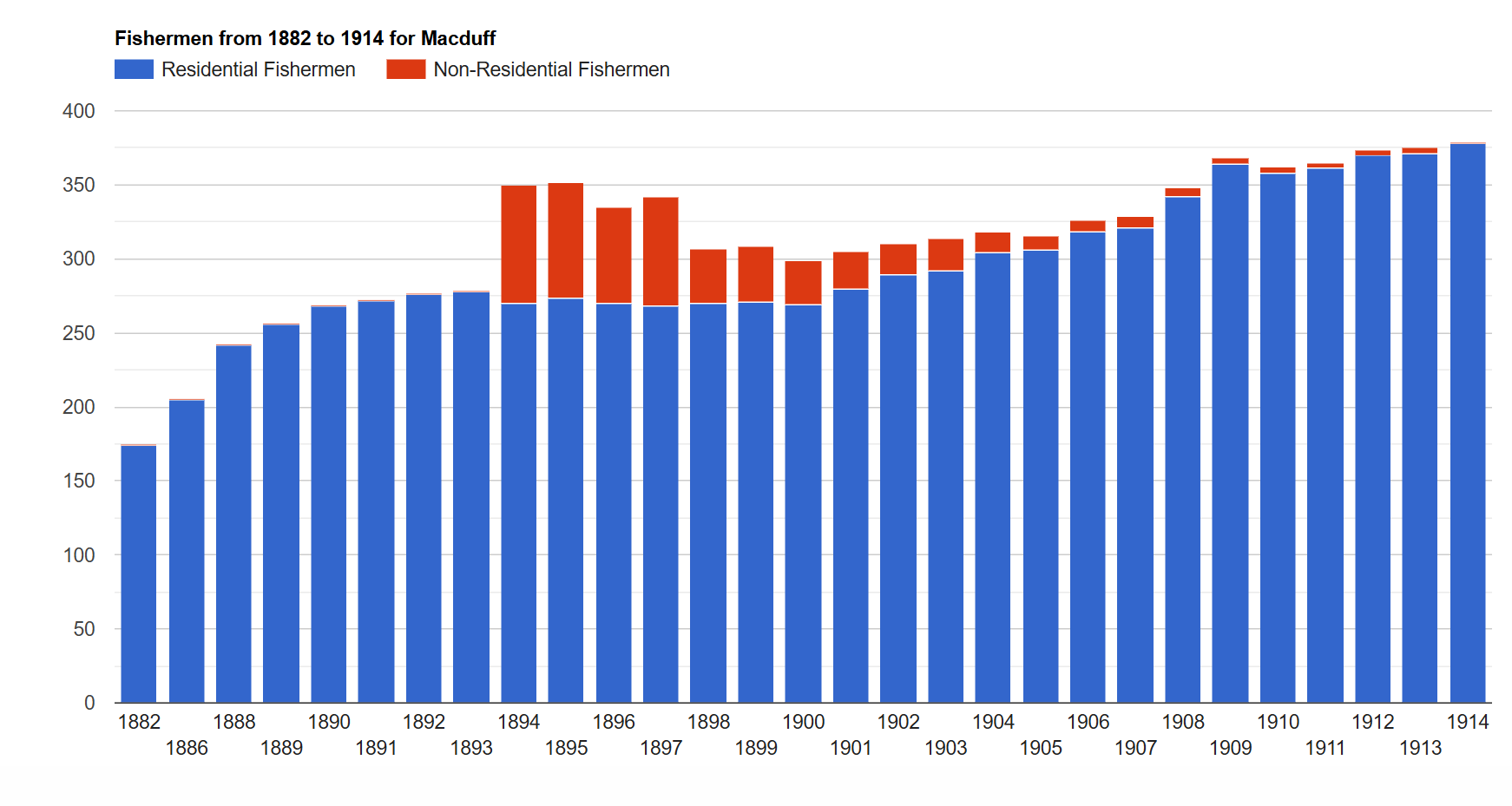
Fishermen

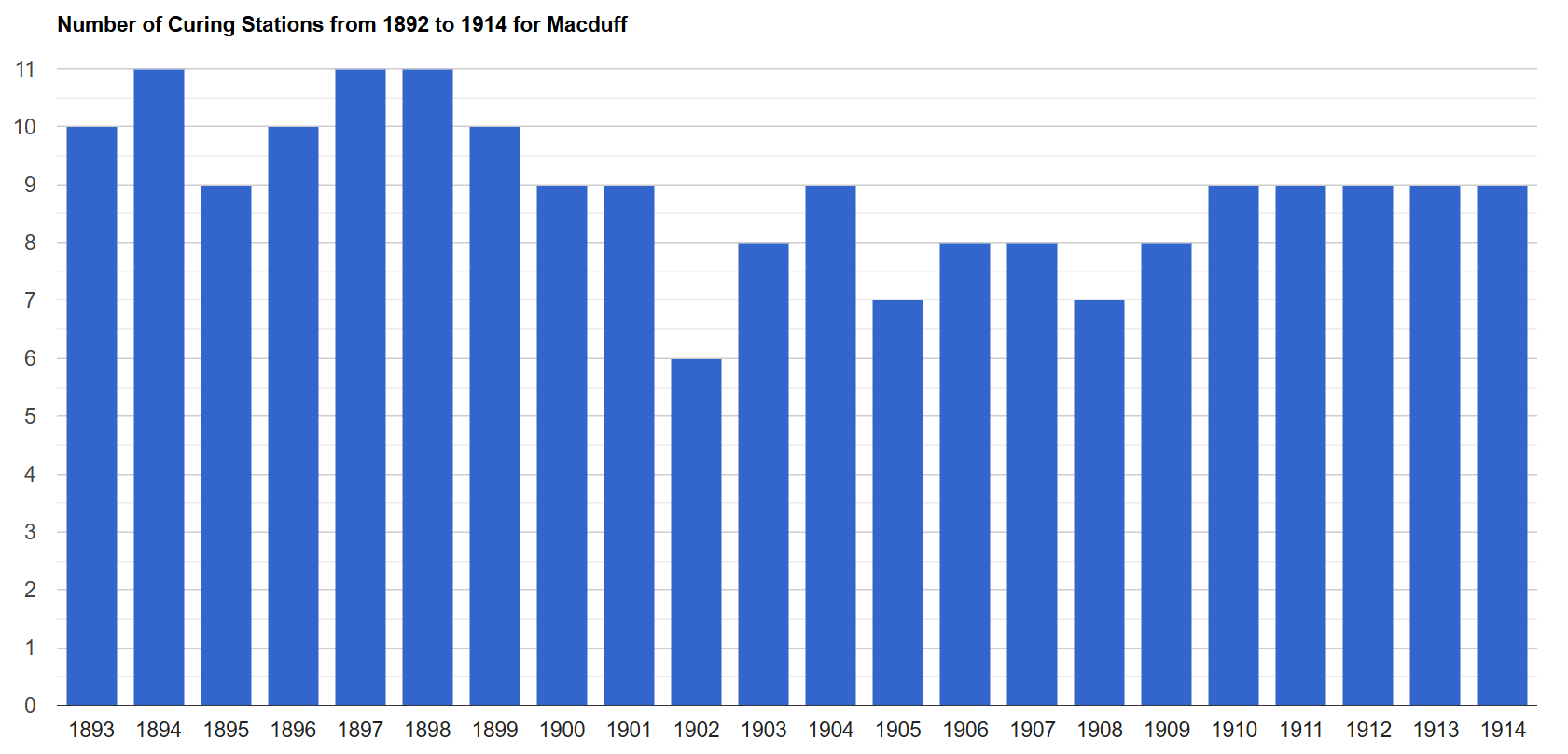
Number of curing stations

== Attractions ==
The town has an aquarium, a maritime heritage centre and a golf course (Royal Tarlair). COAST Festival of the Visual Arts is an annual festival of weekend-long events and attractions in both Banff and Macduff. It runs over the bank holiday weekend at the end of May each year. The town once had an outdoor swimming pool, which has fallen into disuse, but is intended to be restored. Many of the nearby villages also contribute to tourism in the area; in particular Gardenstown and Pennan.

== Architecture ==
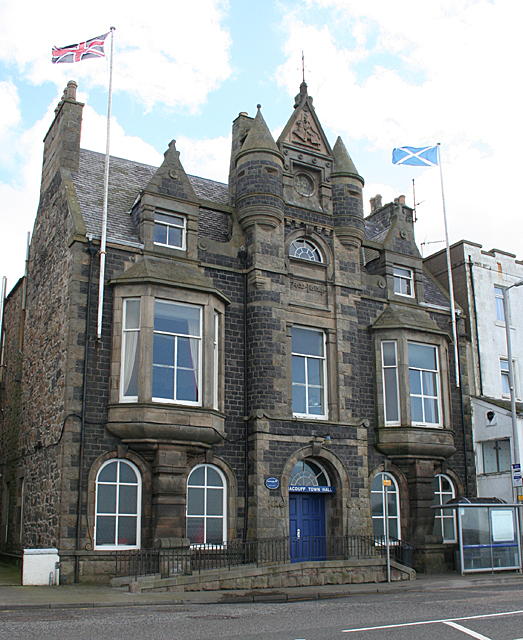
Macduff's Town Hall

Macduff Town Hall, on Shore Street, is a Category B listed building constructed in 1884.

== Lifeboat ==
Macduff has an RNLI lifeboat station which is equipped with an Atlantic 85 inshore lifeboat, Lydia Macdonald. The Macduff lifeboat is unique within the Royal National Lifeboat Institution, being the only inshore lifeboat that is stored on, launched and recovered from a LGV fitted with its own crane. This allows the lifeboat to be launched and recovered from different locations along the coast should the need arise.

== Railways ==
Macduff was served from 1860 by the Banff, Macduff and Turriff Junction Railway, later absorbed by the Great North of Scotland Railway (GNSR) which at first ran to Banff & Macduff station, almost one mile (1.5 kilometres) from the town. In 1872 the line to Banff & Macduff station benefited from a replacement station closer to the town centre; Macduff railway station opened, and the original station closed on 1 July 1872. The preceding station before the terminus in Macduff was Banff Bridge railway station, placed near the bridge between Banff and Macduff. Banff itself was served by another station, Banff Harbour (later just Banff), and since this was on a separate line (originally belonging to the Banff, Portsoy and Strathisla Railway, though later absorbed by the GNSR), it also provided an alternative route that came close to Macduff.

All the lines suffered from mid-20th century railway cuts, with Macduff station closing by the end of 1961.

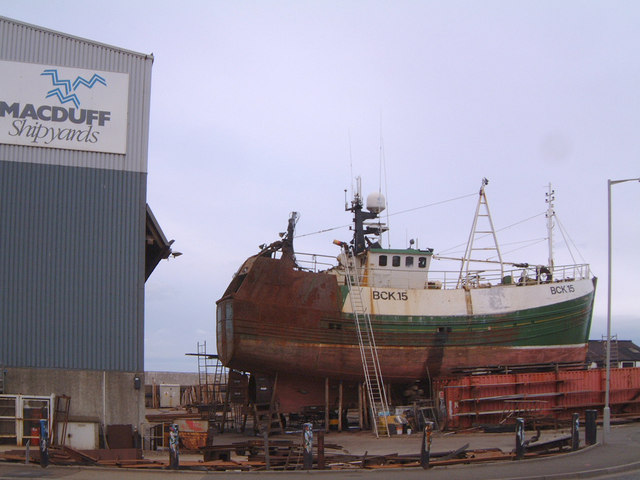
Boatyard in Macduff

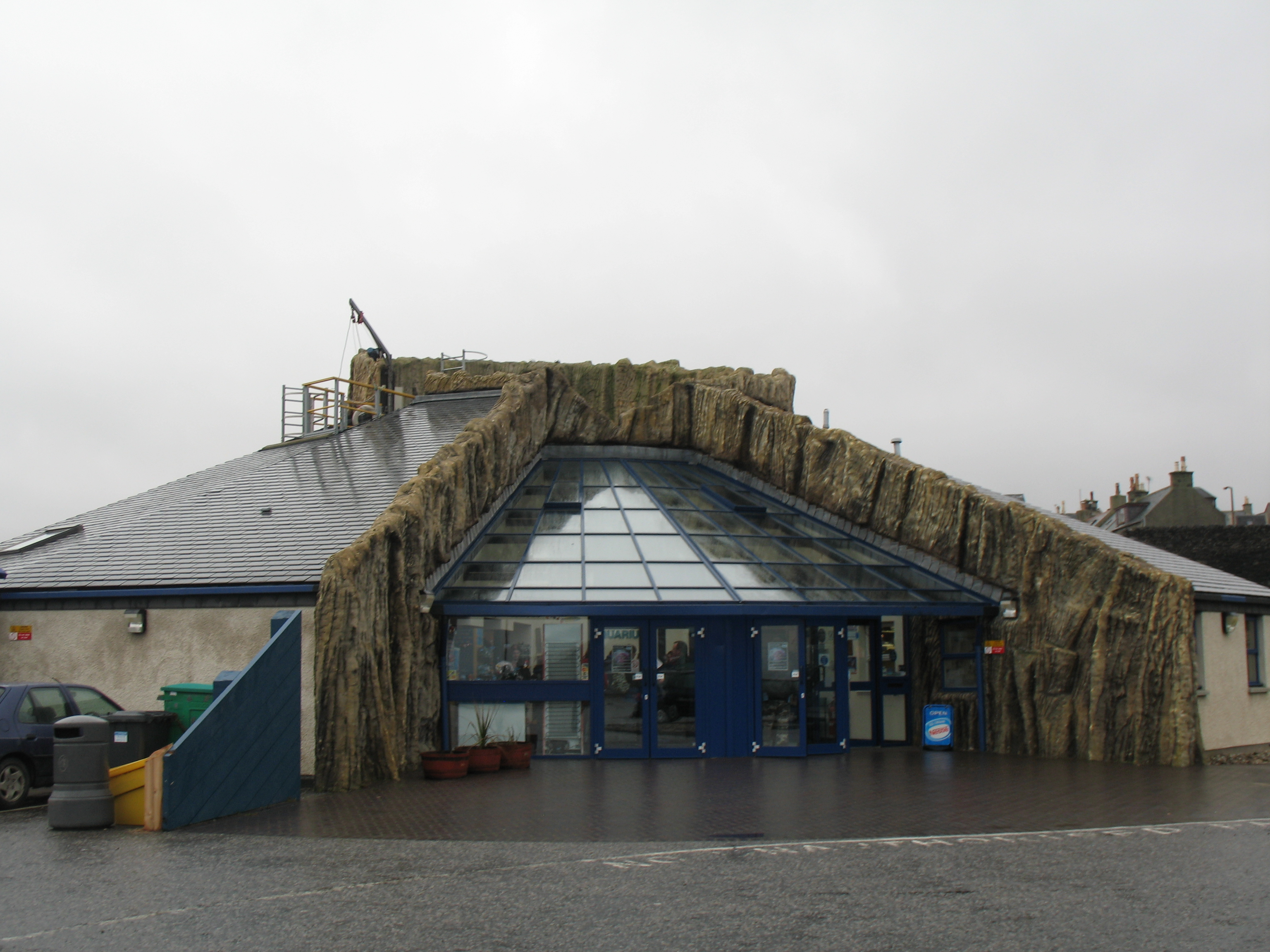
The sea life centre

== Sport ==
Macduff has a golf course known as Royal Tarlair which was built on land which ends on precipitous cliffs so lost balls really are lost. It is home to the famous 13th hole called The Clivet.

In 2016 the Macduff Sports and Community Centre was opened. It houses a 4G AstroTurf pitch with an indoor tennis court sized hall.

Macduff have a new welfare football club called Macduff AFC. They play their home games at the new Macduff Sports Centre.

== See also ==
- B9031 road
- Burn of Myrehouse
- William Duff's Duff House (across the River Deveron in neighbouring Banff)

== Notable residents ==
- Colin Newton (born 1977), a drummer
- Sandi Thom (born 1981), a singer-songwriter
- Matthew Cooper (born 1994), a professional footballer
- Dr Eilidh Whiteford (born 1969), SNP politician. Member of the UK Parliament for Banff and Buchan from 2010 to 2017
- Walford Bodie (1869–1939), magician and showman, Manor House Macduff 1905 to 1939
