= Banff and Buchan =

Modern committee area in Aberdeenshire

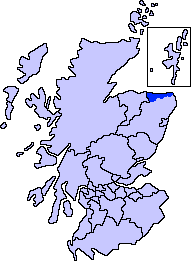
Map of Scotland showing the present-day committee area of Banff and Buchan

Banff and Buchan is a committee area of the Aberdeenshire Council, Scotland, covering an area along the northern coast of the council area. The main towns are Banff and Fraserburgh. Fishing and agriculture are important industries, together with associated processing and service activity.

Banff and Buchan was also the name of a district of Grampian Region between 1975 and 1996. The district covered a much larger area than the modern committee area. Its council was based in Banff.

== History ==
The area has a long history of human occupation. Prehistoric features include a large long barrow at Longman Hill south-east of Macduff, as well as Cairn Lee to the west of Longman Hill.

== Local government district ==
Banff and Buchan
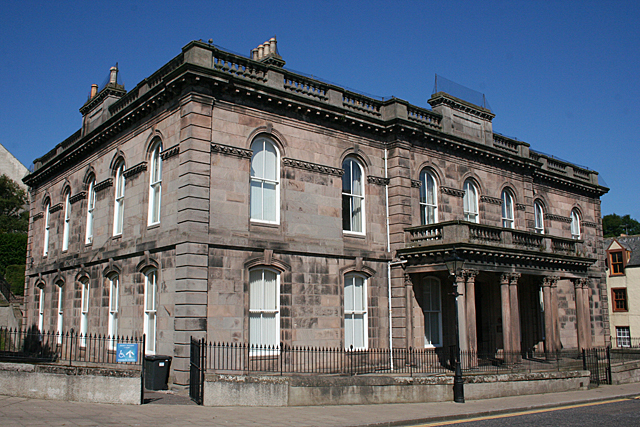
- Banff Sheriff Court, Low Street, Banff: Council's meeting place

- Banff and Buchan district within Scotland
- History
  - Created: 16 May 1975
  - Abolished: 31 Mar 1996
  - Succeeded by: Aberdeenshire
- Status: District
  - HQ: Banff

The Banff and Buchan local government district was created on 16 May 1975 under the Local Government (Scotland) Act 1973, which established a two-tier structure of local government across Scotland comprising upper-tier regions and lower-tier districts. Banff and Buchan was one of five districts created within the Grampian region. The new district covered parts of the historic counties of Aberdeenshire and Banffshire. It covered the whole area of twelve former districts and parts of another two, which were all abolished at the same time:

From Aberdeenshire

- Deer district
- Ellon district (parish of Cruden only)
- Fraserburgh burgh
- Peterhead burgh
- Rosehearty burgh
- Turriff burgh
- Turriff district

From Banffshire

- Aberchirder burgh
- Aberchirder district
- Banff burgh
- Banff district
- Cullen district (Fordyce electoral division only) (Note: The Fordyce electoral division covered the part of the parish of Fordyce outside the burgh of Portsoy.)
- Macduff burgh
- Portsoy burgh

The rest of Banffshire became part of the Moray district of the Grampian region. The new district was named Banff and Buchan, combining the names of the former county and town of Banff and the ancient province of Buchan, which had covered the parts of the district from Aberdeenshire.

The regions and districts created in 1975 were abolished in 1996, being replaced by council areas. The area of Banff and Buchan was merged with the Gordon and Kincardine and Deeside districts to become the new Aberdeenshire council area.

=== Political control ===
The first election to the district council was held in 1974, initially operating as a shadow authority alongside the outgoing authorities until it came into its powers on 16 May 1975. Throughout the council's existence, a majority of the seats were held by independent councillors:

Party in control	Years
Independent	1975–1996

=== Premises ===
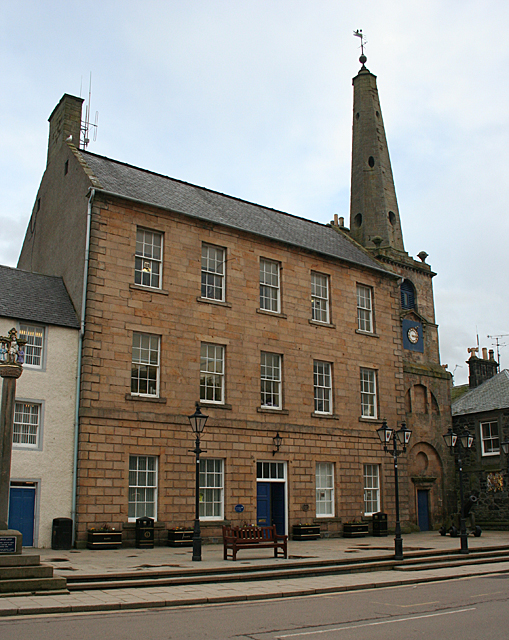
Banff Town House, 34 Low Street, Banff: One of the council's offices

The district council met at Banff Sheriff Court, the courthouse (built 1871) which had also served as the meeting place of the old Banffshire County Council. The district council had its main offices at St Leonard's House on Sandyhill Road in Banff, which had also been the main offices of the former Banffshire County Council since 1934. It also used other offices inherited from its predecessors, notably including Banff Town House at 34 Low Street, formerly offices of Banff Town Council, and Arbuthnot House on Broad Street in Peterhead, formerly offices of Peterhead Town Council.

The offices passed to Aberdeenshire Council on local government reorganisation in 1996. St Leonard's House and Banff Town House continue to be used as area offices.

== Committee area ==
The successor Aberdeenshire Council established a number of area committees to discuss local matters. One is called Banff and Buchan, but covers a smaller area than the pre-1996 district. The committee area just covers the wards of Banff and District, Fraserburgh and District and Troup. Other parts of the pre-1996 district are included in the committee areas of Buchan (the area around Peterhead) and Formartine (the area around Turriff).

== Parliamentary constituencies ==
The name is also used for the Banff and Buchan constituency of the House of Commons of the Parliament of the United Kingdom (at Westminster). From 1999 to 2011 Banff and Buchan was also used as a constituency of the Scottish Parliament (at Holyrood). Despite sharing the same name, the boundaries of the two constituencies differed after 2005.

== See also ==
- Subdivisions of Scotland
