= Blair Atholl railway station =

Railway station in Perth and Kinross, Scotland

Blair Atholl Scottish Gaelic: Blàr Athall
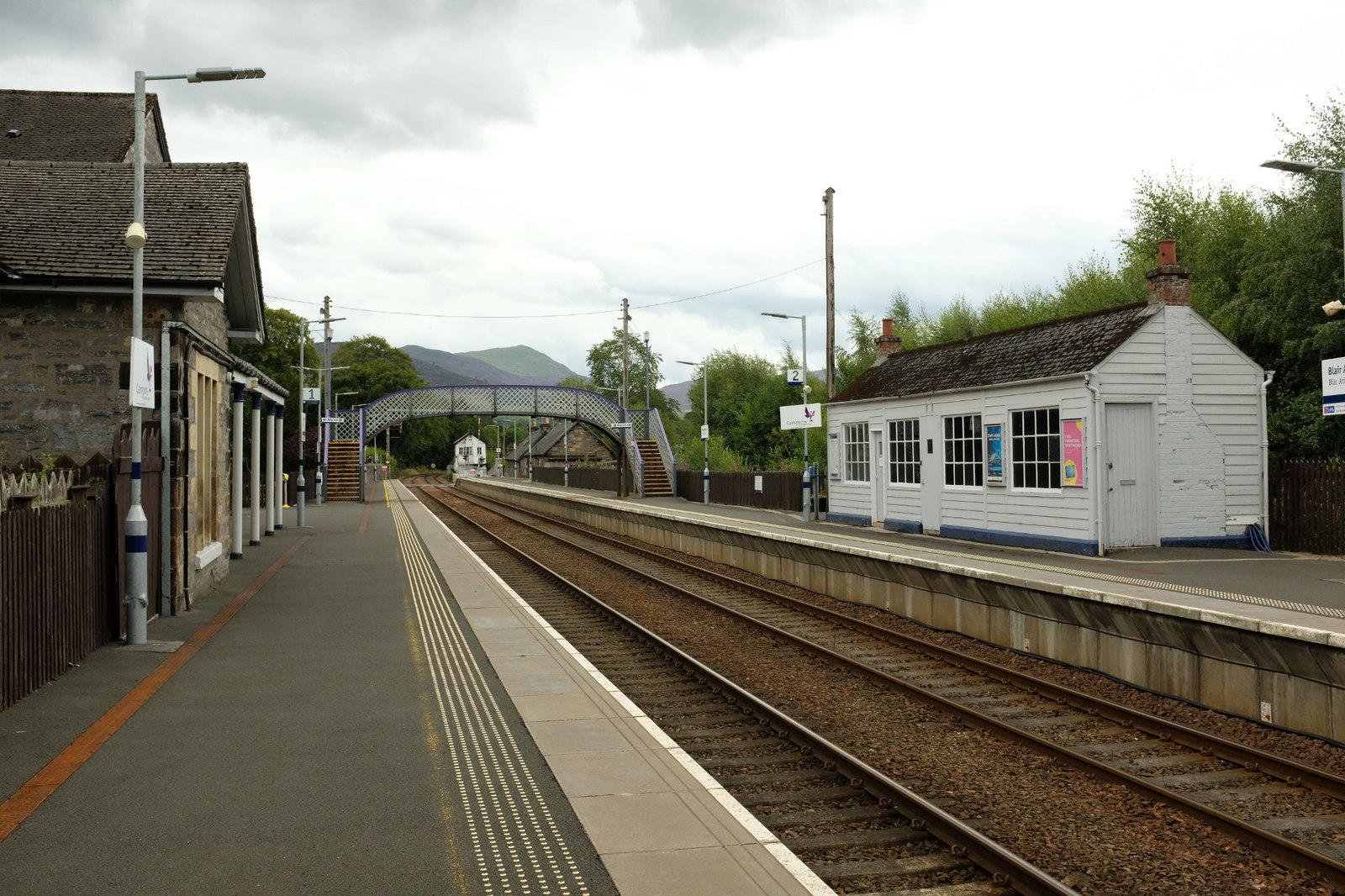
- General view, looking south

General information
- Location: Blair Atholl, Perth and Kinross; Scotland
- Coordinates: 56.7653°N 3.8496°W
- Grid reference: NN870652
- Manager: ScotRail
- Platforms: 2

Other information
- Station code: BLA

Key dates
- 9 September 1863: Opened as Blair Athole
- 1872: Possibly renamed to Blair Athol
- 1893 or 1894: Renamed to Blair Atholl

Passengers
- 2021/22: ▲11,870
- 2022/23: ▲13,402
- 2023/24: ▲15,126
- 2024/25: ▲16,446
- 2025/26: ▲18,162
Location
Notes
- Passenger statistics from the Office of Rail and Road

Blair Atholl railway station is a railway station serving the village of Blair Atholl, Perth and Kinross, Scotland. The station is managed by ScotRail and is on the Highland Main Line, 35 miles 9 chains (56.5 km) from Perth, between Pitlochry and Dalwhinnie. There is a crossover at the north end of the station to allow trains to turn back if the line south to Pitlochry is closed.

== History ==
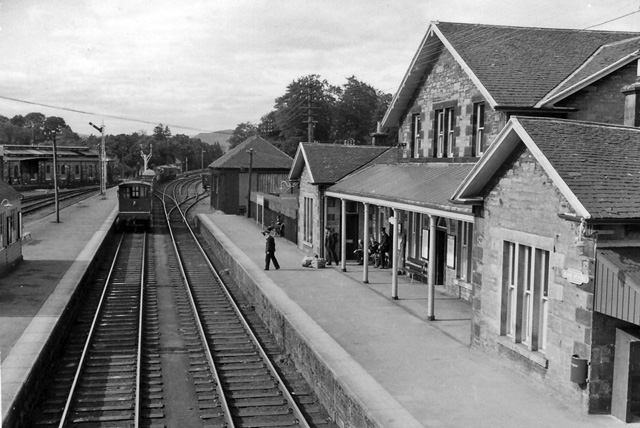
Looking north from the station in 1962

The station was opened by the Inverness and Perth Junction Railway on 9 September 1863.

One of the first visitors to the station was Queen Victoria, who arrived in a Royal Train on 15 September 1863 during a visit to Blair Castle to see George Murray, 6th Duke of Atholl, who was very ill. For its first thirty years until 1893, the station was named 'Blair Athole'; the present station was renamed to its current name in the 1890s.

It originally had a 770-yard (700 m) long passing loop, which was flanked by the two platforms, but this has since been extended northwards as double track as far as Dalwhinnie. The redoubling was completed between 1976 and 1977.

== Facilities ==
There are benches on both platforms, with a waiting shelter on platform 2 and natural shelter from the station buildings on platform 1, with a small car park and bike racks adjacent to the latter. As well as the footbridge between the platforms, there is also step-free access to both platforms (from the car park to platform 1 and from the level crossing to platform 2). As there are no facilities to purchase tickets, passengers must buy one in advance, or from the guard on the train.

In 2022, the station building became vacant. In 2025, ScotRail and Network Rail began a feasibility study into whether or not the station building could be converted into affordable housing.

== Platform layout ==
The station has a passing loop 35 chains (700 m) long, with two platforms. Platform 1 on the southbound line can accommodate trains having seven coaches, whereas platform 2 on the northbound line can hold eleven. Beyond here the line is double track as far as Dalwhinnie.

== Passenger volume ==
Passenger Volume at Blair Atholl
	2004–05	2005–06	2006–07	2007–08	2008–09	2009–10	2010–11	2011–12	2012–13	2013–14	2014–15	2015–16	2016–17	2017–18	2018–19	2019–20	2020–21	2021–22	2022–23	2023–24	2024–25
Entries and exits	11,708	11,896	10,491	10,443	10,580	11,572	13,948	12,608	14,280	14,084	16,062	16,652	17,598	19,802	21,008	18,388	3,688	11,870	13,402	15,126	16,446

The statistics cover twelve month periods that start in April.

== Services ==
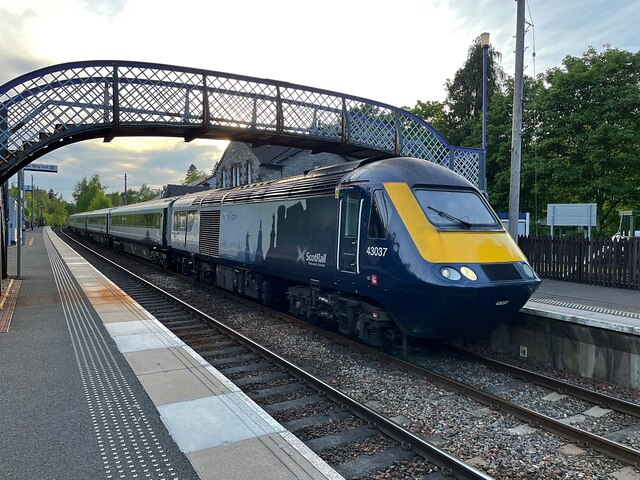
A ScotRail High Speed Train at the station

As of the May 2026 timetable, on weekdays and Saturdays there are 6 trains per day northbound (all going to Inverness), and 5 trains per day southbound (three to Glasgow Queen Street, two to Edinburgh. On Sundays, there are 3 trains per day to Inverness (1 of which extends to Elgin), and 2 trains to Glasgow and 2 trains to Edinburgh, including the Highland Chieftain to London Kings Cross. In addition to these, the Caledonian Sleeper operates six nights per week to London Euston.

Preceding station	National Rail	Following station
Pitlochry	Caledonian Sleeper; Highland Caledonian Sleeper; Southbound only	Dalwhinnie
Pitlochry	ScotRail; Highland Main Line	Dalwhinnie
Pitlochry	ScotRail; Highland Main Line	Kingussie
Pitlochry	ScotRail; Highland Main Line	Newtonmore
Pitlochry	London North Eastern Railway; Sundays, Southbound Only; Highland Main Line	Newtonmore
	Historical railways	
Killiecrankie; Line open; station closed	Highland Railway; Inverness and Perth Junction Railway	Black Island Platform; Line open; station closed

== See also ==
- Public transport in Perth and Kinross

== Bibliography ==
- Quick, Michael (2022). Railway Passenger Stations in Great Britain: A Chronology (PDF) (5th ed.). London: Railway and Canal Historical Society. Archived from the original (PDF) on 15 March 2023.
