= Public transport in Perth and Kinross =

The location of Perth and Kinross in Scotland

Public transport in Perth and Kinross is available for two main modes of transport—bus and rail—assisting residents of and visitors to the Perth and Kinross council area to travel around much of its 2,041 square miles (5,290 km^{2}).

As of 2026, nine operators provide bus and coach services in Perth and Kinross, the largest being Stagecoach South Scotland.

Perth and Kinross is home to five railway stations: Perth, Gleneagles, Pitlochry, Dunkeld & Birnam and Blair Atholl.

Although Perth has an airport—Perth Airport—it is not used for commercial flights.

== Bus ==
=== Local ===
Perth and Kinross Council (PKC) has divided the council area (plus a couple of adjoining areas) into six regions:

- Auchterarder and Crieff
- Carse and Scone
- Kinross-shire and Bridge of Earn
- Blairgowrie
- Highland Perthshire and Stanley
- City of Perth

Local buses are operated by Stagecoach South Scotland, Docherty's Midland Coaches (seven routes), Glenfarg Community Transport Group (two routes), Elizabeth Yule (two routes) and Bay Travel (one route).

Stagecoach launched Perth's fleet of fully electric buses, for its routes 1 and 2, in 2022. It is part of the company's commitment to achieve a zero-emissions bus fleet by 2035. Scotland, as a whole, is targeting net zero by 2045.

In June 2024, residents of Perth and Kinross were permitted to travel on select bus services at no charge on the first Saturday of each month. The programme ran until June 2025, with the participating companies being Stagecoach East Scotland, Docherty's Midland Coaches, Elizabeth Yule, Sweeney's Garage and Glenfarg Community Transport Group. A similar programme was launched in February 2026 for a month.

The public transport routes given below are for Stagecoach East Scotland, unless otherwise noted.

=== Auchterarder and Crieff ===
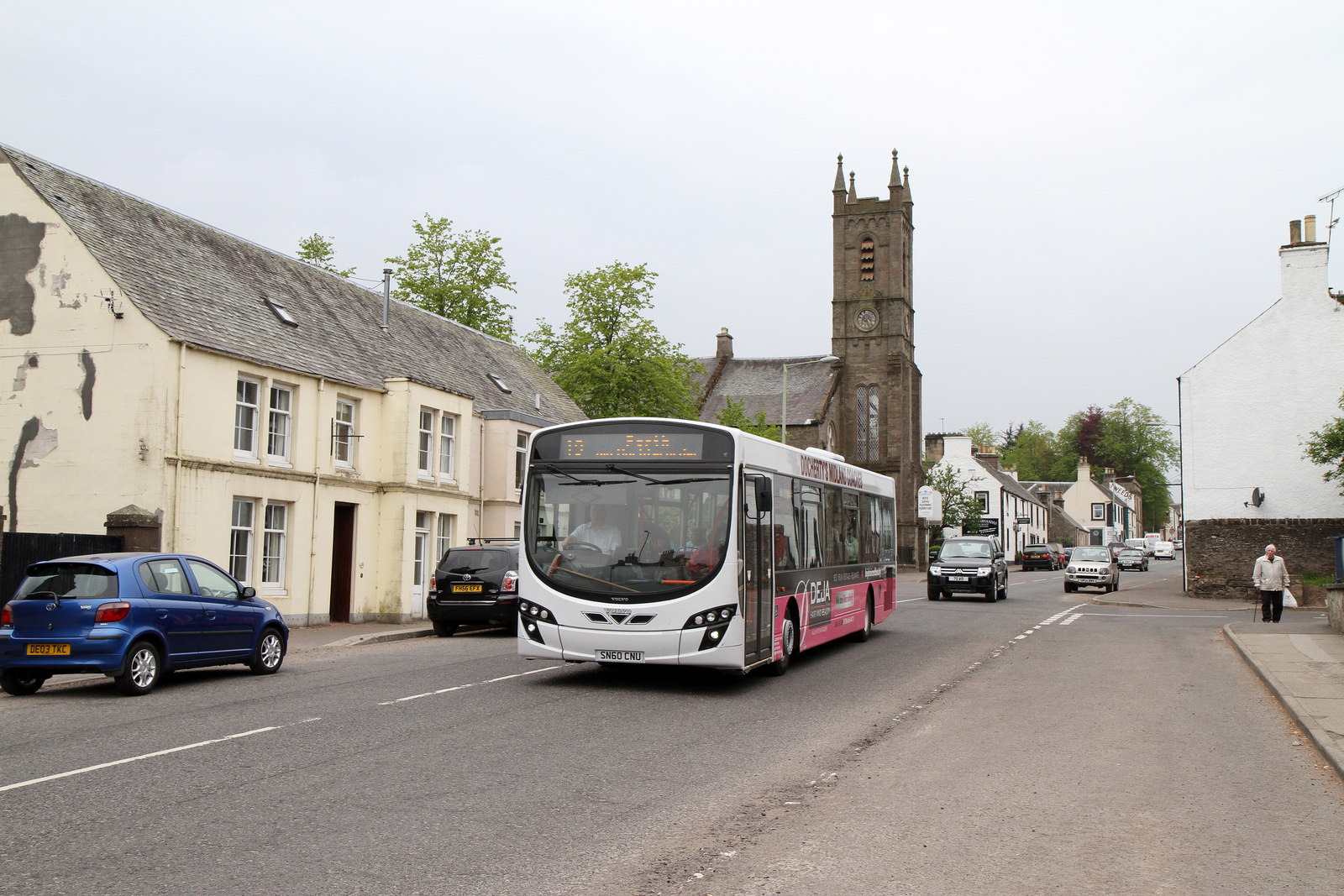
The number 19 on Auchterarder's High Street (2011), operated by Docherty's Midland Coaches

There are fourteen routes in Auchterarder and Crieff. Six services begin in Perth: the 14 (from Kinnoull Street to Almondbank and Pitcairngreen), 15 (from Perth bus station to Crieff, Comrie and St Fillans), 15A (from Perth bus station to Crieff, Braco, Dunblane and Stirling) and 17 (from Aviva to Bridge of Earn, Dunning and Auchterarder). Docherty's Midland Coaches' numbers 19 and 20, originating at Perth bus station, stop in Auchterarder, Gleneagles, Blackford, Braco and Stirling.

The 115 serves Comrie and St Fillans.

The centre of Crieff is served by the number 45, while the 46 loops between Madderty, Fowlis Wester and Crieff.

Auchterarder's town service is Docherty's number 49.

Docherty's number 601 runs between Balgowan, Madderty, Gilmerton and the Crieff schools. Balgowan's route 155 service from Docherty's was withdrawn in July 2023 (during Scottish Bus Week) due to a decline in usage. This left residents of Tibbermore with no bus service.

Docherty's 613 and 618 both serve Auchterarder and Dunning, while their 890 runs from Crieff to Comrie, St Fillans, Lochearnhead and Killin. The 892 serves Aberfeldy and Coshieville.

=== Carse and Scone ===
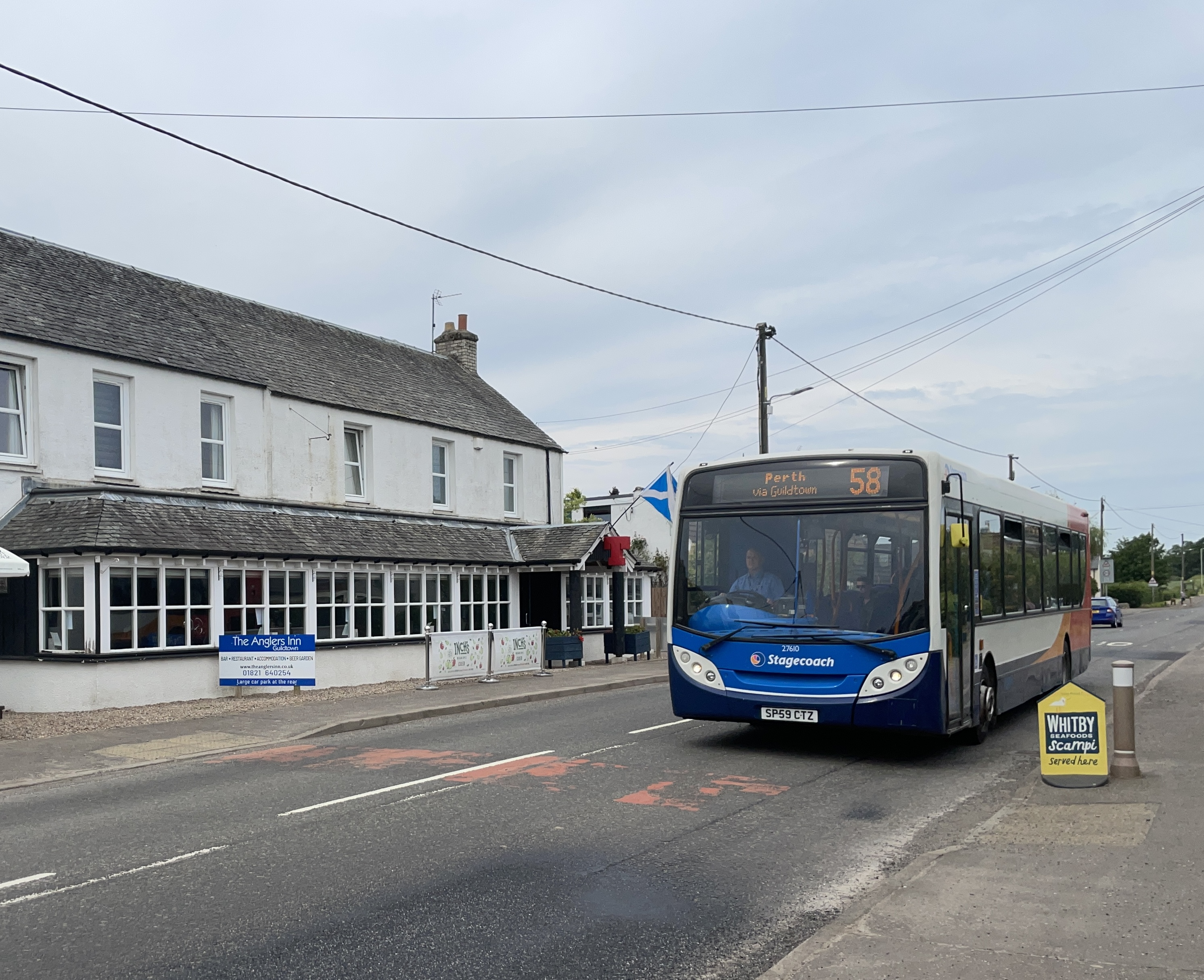
The route 58 outside the Anglers Inn in Guildtown (2023)

Nine routes serve Carse of Gowrie and Scone, four of which originate in Perth. Route 3 picks up at South Street and loops through Goshen, Catmore and Scone. The 7 begins at Broxden park and ride and travels to the Hillend park and ride via Perth city centre. Route 11 circles between Kinnoull Street and Kinnoull, while the 12 begins in Gannochy and travels to Viewlands on the Glasgow Road via Perth city centre.

Route 16 begins in Dundee and travels west along the River Tay to Perth bus station. The 51 runs between Abernyte and Perth Royal Infirmary. Route 57 runs between Dundee and Perth's Hillyland via Blairgowrie, Coupar Angus and Scone, while the 58 begins in Blairgowrie and serves Meikleour, Wolfhill, Guildtown, Scone and terminates at Perth Academy in Viewlands.

=== Kinross-shire and Bridge of Earn ===
Seven routes serve this area, four of which originate in Perth: the number 17 Bridge of Earn, Dunning and Auchterarder circular; the 36 Bridge of Earn, Newburgh and Glenrothes route; and the 56A Perth–to–Halbeath route.

The 66 originates in Glenrothes and terminates at Perth bus station.

Glenfarg is the starting point of the 55, run by Glenfarg Community Transport Group (GCTG), which stops in Milnathort and Kinross. It replaced a service run by Earnside Coaches. In 2024, GCTG added new route between Kinross and Perth.

The 201 runs between Glenrothes, Scotlandwell, Milnathort and Kinross, while the 202 is a circular between Kinross and Tillicoultry, operated by Bay Travel. This replaced the First Bus X53 service, which was withdrawn in 2022.

=== Blairgowrie ===
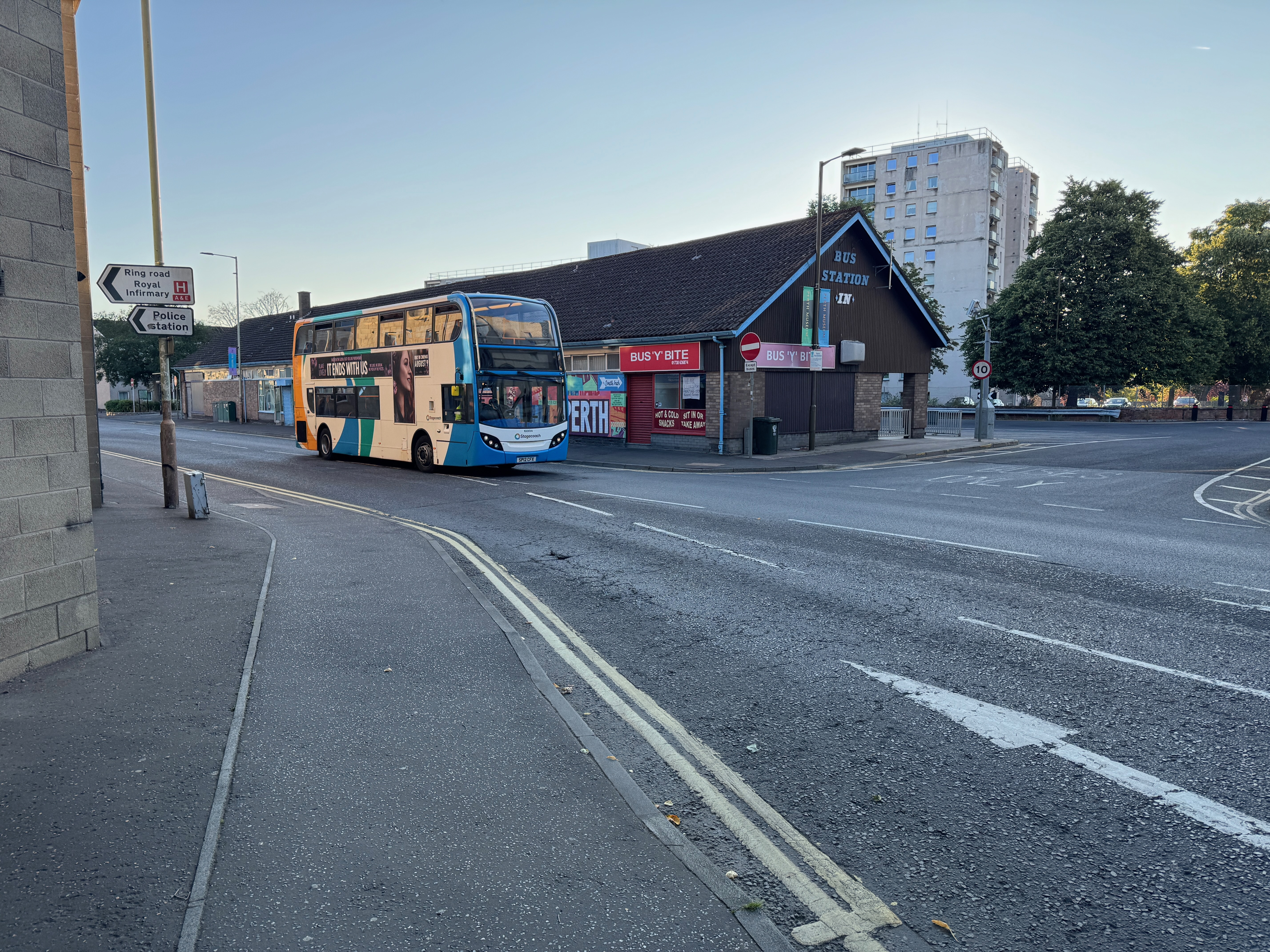
The number 57 arriving at Perth bus station (2024)

Ten routes serve the Blairgowrie and Rattray area.

The number 34(A), which sets out from Perth's Mill Street, serves Luncarty, Stanley, Spittalfield before reaching Blairgowrie.

The 51 originates in Abernyte and terminates at Perth Royal Infirmary.

Dundee is the starting point for the 57, which passes through Blairgowrie en route to Perth's South Street. The 6:30 am service terminates at Perth College UHI in Hillyland.

The 58 originates in Blairgowrie and passes through Scone before terminating at Perth Academy.

A Blairgowrie–Coupar Angus–Dundee circular is served by the 59.

The 60 runs from Blairgowrie to Aberfeldy via Dunkeld.

The 63 is a Blairgowrie town service.

Tarvie is the destination of the number 71, which runs between Blairgowrie, Bridge of Cally and Kirkmichael.

The 125, from Forfar, stops in Glamis, Eassie, Meigle en route to Newtyle in Angus.

Finally, the 128 is a Kirriemuir–Alyth circular.

=== Highland Perthshire and Stanley ===
Two Stagecoach buses in Ballinluig (2016)

An Elizabeth Yule coach in Pitlochry (2014)

Thirteen services in rural Perth and Kinross are available.

The 23 begins at Mill Street in Perth and makes its way to Aberfeldy.

Ballinluig is the starting point for the 24, which loops through Pitlochry and Moulin.

The 34, originating from Mill Street in Perth, passes through Inveralmond, Stanley and Blairgowrie.

Blairgowrie's number 60 serves Dunkeld and Aberfeldy.

Elizabeth Yule's route 82 departs from Pitlochry and serves Faskally, Tummel Bridge and Kinloch Rannoch. Its 87 serves Pitlochry, Faskally, Killiecrankie, Blair Atholl, Bruar and Calvine.

Aberfeldy is the origination of the 83, which stops in Grandtully, Ballinluig, Pitlochry, Blair Atholl and Calvine. Aberfeldy Motor Services, established in 1976, went out of business in 2023.

The 91A is a circular service between Aberfeldy and Kenmore, while the 91B is an Aberfeldy town service.

The 893 runs between Killin, Lawers, Fearnan, Kenmore, Acharn and Aberfeldy.

Aberfeldy is the origin of Docherty's 896, which serves Amulree and Crieff.

=== City of Perth ===
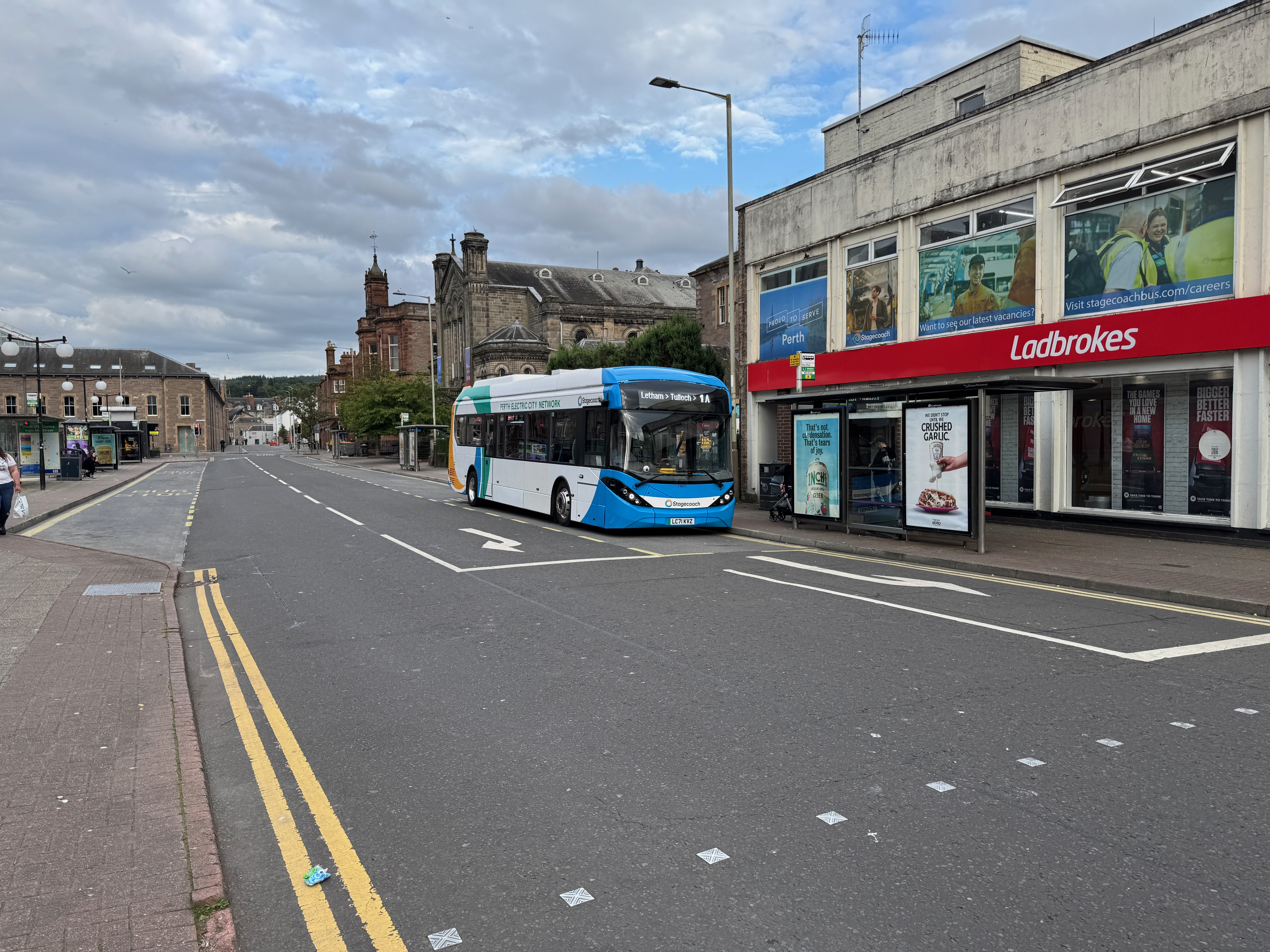
Stagecoach's route 1A on Mill Street in Perth (2024)

Perth has fifteen local routes, most of which originate from the city centre. Route 1 loops between Mill Street exchange in the city centre, Perth Royal Infirmary, Letham and Tulloch. Route 2 runs from Mill Street to Tulloch, Letham and Perth Royal Infirmary. Route 3 runs from South Street to Goshen, Catmoor and Scone. Route 4 begins at Perth bus station and serves Inveralmond and Bertha Park. Routes 5 and 6, originating at Mill Street, both serve Moncreiffe and Craigie. The Broxden park and ride is the origin of route 7; it travels to Scone's park and ride. Route 8 begins at Mill Street in the city centre and runs to Hillend. Route 9, beginning from Mill Street, serves Muirton and North Muirton. Route 11, originating from Kinnoull Street, crosses the River Tay to Bridgend and Kinnoull Hill. Route 12 begins in Gannochy and runs to Viewlands via the city centre. Route 13 runs from Kinnoull Street to Dobbies Garden Centre in East Huntingtower via Perth Royal Infirmary. Routes 14 and 14A run from Kinnoull Street to Almondbank and Pitcairngreen. Route 18 runs between Mill Street and Aviva in Pitheavlis. Finally, route 70 runs between Inveralmond, Moncreiffe, the city centre and North Muirton.

== Inter-city ==
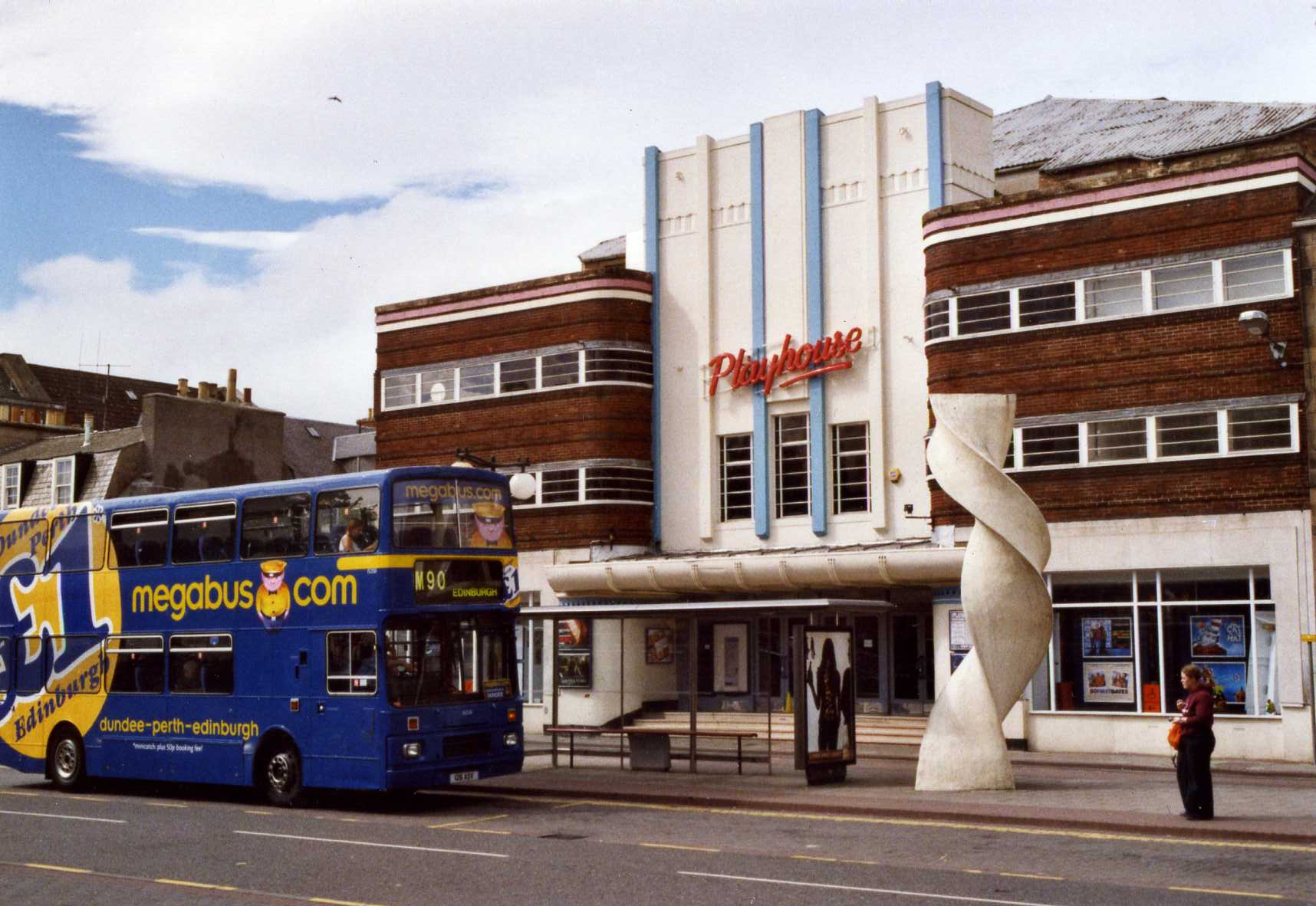
The route M90 Megabus on Perth's Mill Street (2004)

Inter-city bus travel can be made from Perth's Leonard Street bus station, which provides connections to most major destinations in Scotland, including FlixBus's number 93 service to and from Glasgow and their 94 to and from Edinburgh.. There is a park and ride service from the services at Broxden to the city centre.

Scottish Citylink provides journeys to Dundee, Aberdeen, Inverness, Glasgow and Edinburgh from Broxden.

Fishers Tours' service 276 runs from Dundee to Ayr via Perth, Gleneagles and Dunblane.

The E1 service runs between Dundee and Edinburgh via Inchture, while the E3 runs between Dundee and Glasgow via Perth.

FlixBus's UK91 service runs between Glasgow Buchanan bus station and Aberdeen via the Broxden park and ride.

Ember began running a fully electric service between Dundee and Edinburgh in 2020. As of 2025, it provides services from Perth to Stirling, Cumbernauld, Dunblane, Dundee, Glasgow and St Madoes.

In May 2025, Stagecoach East Scotland began running a "Jet 787" route, connecting Kinross with Edinburgh Airport as part of a route from St Andrews.

The weekday-only X7 Coastrider formerly ran between Aberdeen bus station and Perth Royal Infirmary. In 2024, the Carse leg between Dundee and Perth was stopped. An extended Stagecoach East Scotland service 39 and new services 39A/39B replaced it. The Carse route was reinstated in 2025. In 2024, The Grange, near Errol, was removed from the service area "due to excess foliage on the roadside", with the route instead diverting to the A90 temporarily. The X8, which ran between Perth Royal Infirmary and Dundee's Ninewells Hospital, was axed in 2018 after having run for less than a year.

== Defunct services ==
A bus service, started in the 1930s, of Stanley-based Allan & Scott, used to run the five miles between Stanley and Bankfoot twice a day on Sundays. The service was taken over in 1946 by A&C McLennan of Spittalfield. Permission to use double-decker buses was granted in 1950. In 1952, the fare was 5 1/2 shillings single and 10 shillings return, with gradual increases to 8 shillings single and one farthing return by 1963. By 1966, the service operated only on the first Sunday of each month. Service was withdrawn in 1967, although A&C McLennan was still in operation in 1969.

Until 2026, Megabus provided services to Edinburgh (city and airport), Glasgow, Inverness, Dundee, Aberdeen and Stirling.

Stagecoach's X56 route to Edinburgh via Kinross, Halbeath and Ferrytoll was withdrawn in August 2026 due to sustainability challenges.

== Future ==
PKC formed the Tayside Bus Alliance with neighbouring authorities, Tactran and local bus operators to focus on prioritising bus projects. A bid was made to Transport Scotland to receive its £500 million Bus Partnership Fund. The funding was secured in June 2021.

In 2026, PKC loaned, for an indeterminate length of time, three eight-seat multipurpose vehicles at no charge, with the aim of assisting rural communities to improving their local transportation options. Kirkmichael Community Transport Group, Muthill Community Transport Group and the Tay Valley Connections Community Group in Aberfeldy were the recipients.

In late 2026, PKC began discussions about developing its own municipal bus operation, with its fleet filling in as and when other operators withdraw their services or they become cost-prohibitive. The project would be phased in over five years.

== Rail ==
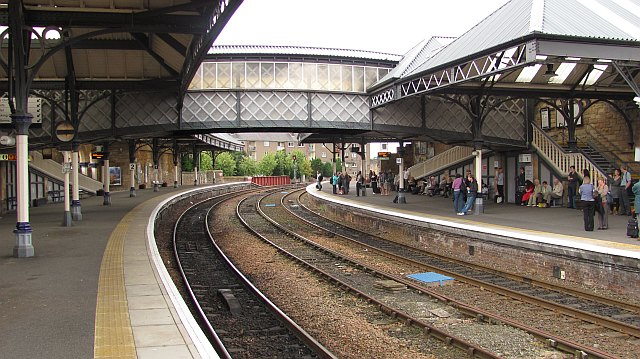
Perth railway station's platforms 1 and 2 (2010)

Perth railway station, which is on the East Coast Main Line, the Highland Main Line and the Glasgow–Dundee Line, has regular services to Fife and Edinburgh Waverley via the Forth Bridge, east to Dundee and Aberdeen, south to Stirling and Glasgow Queen Street, and north to Inverness. There are two direct trains per day to London: the Highland Chieftain, operated by London North Eastern Railway to King's Cross (from Inverness), while the Caledonian Sleeper runs overnight to Euston.

Perth and Kinross is home to four other stations (from south to north): Gleneagles, Dunkeld & Birnam, Pitlochry and Blair Atholl.
