= Newtonmore railway station =

Railway station in the Highlands of Scotland

Newtonmore Scottish Gaelic: Baile Ùr an t-Slèibh
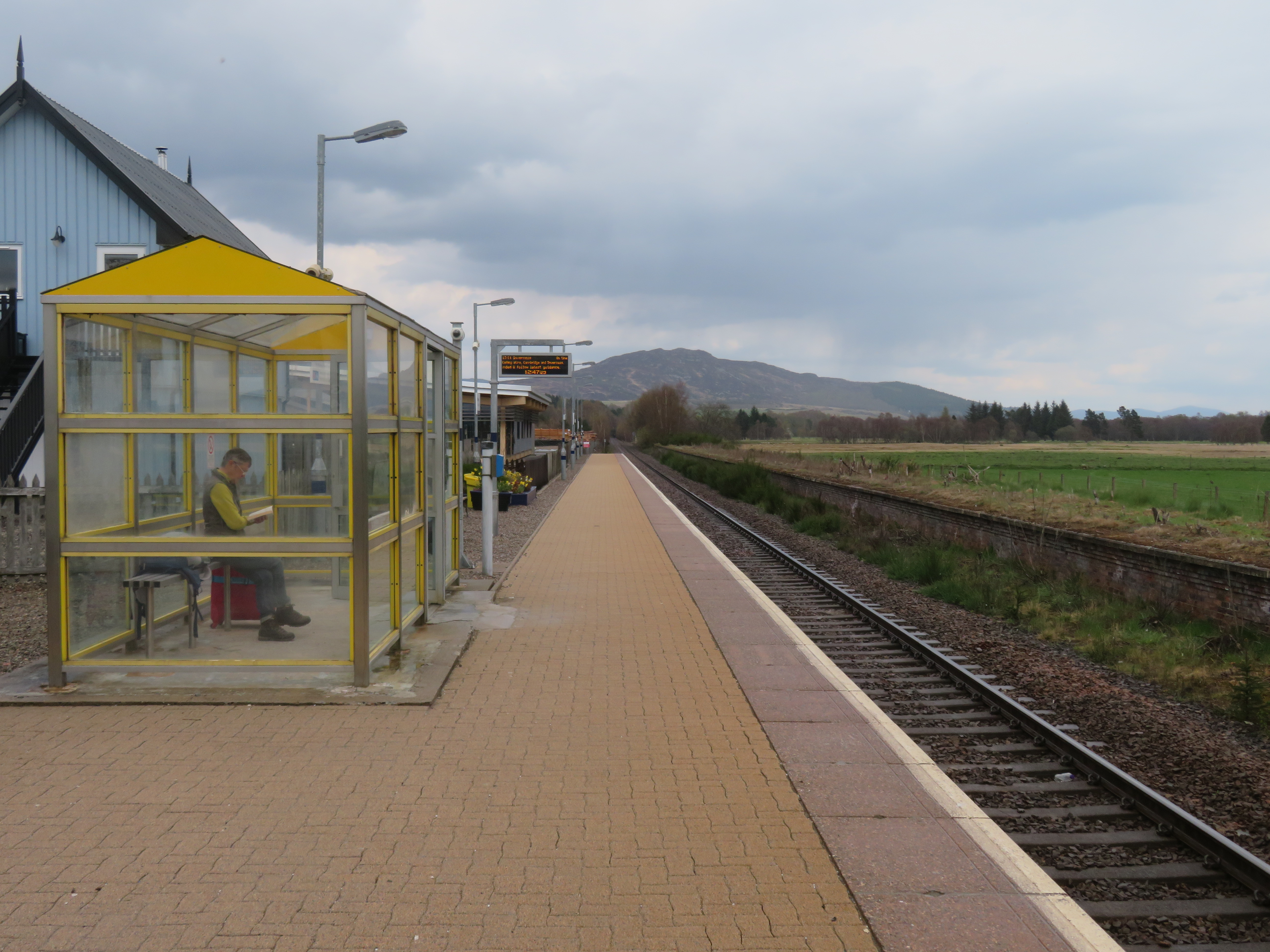
- View north towards Kingussie

General information
- Location: Newtonmore, Highland; Scotland
- Coordinates: 57.0595°N 4.1184°W
- Grid reference: NN715984
- Manager: ScotRail
- Platforms: 1

Other information
- Station code: NWR

History
- Original company: Inverness and Perth Junction Railway
- Pre-grouping: Highland Railway
- Post-grouping: London, Midland and Scottish Railway

Key dates
- 9 September 1863: Opened

Passengers
- 2021/22: ▲5,400
- 2022/23: ▲6,470
- 2023/24: ▲8,484
- 2024/25: ▼8,454
- 2025/26: ▲9,136

Listed Building – Category B
- Designated: 20 December 1979
- Reference no.: LB7673
Location
Notes
- Passenger statistics from the Office of Rail and Road

Newtonmore railway station serves the village of Newtonmore, Highland, Scotland. The station is managed by ScotRail and is on the Highland Main Line. The station is 68 miles 62 chains (110.7 km) from Perth, between Dalwhinnie and Kingussie, and has a single platform which is long enough for a ten-coach train. It is currently the only station on the Highland Main Line to have one platform, although the former second platform can still be seen adjacent to the first platform.

== History ==
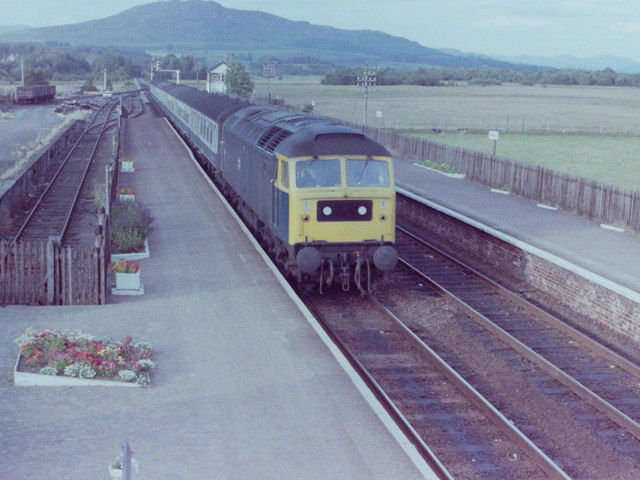
The station seen in 1981, with both platforms in situ

The station was opened on 9 September 1863 by the Inverness and Perth Junction Railway (I&PJn) when the I&PJn opened the section from Aviemore to Pitlochry.

The station had two platforms, connected with a footbridge, either side of a passing loop, there was a goods yard to the north that was able to accommodate most types of goods including live stock, it was equipped with a five-ton crane. There were two signal boxes and a turntable.

A camping coach was positioned here by the Scottish Region from 1964 to 1967.

The station was listed for closure in the 1980s but was saved.

=== Accidents and incidents ===
The original station buildings were constructed of wood and were destroyed in a fire in April 1893. A replacement station building in stone was erected in 1893.

A serious accident occurred on 2 August 1894 when the morning passenger train from Perth to Inverness collided with a goods train. One passenger was killed and several were badly injured.

On 13 September 1900, James Ormiston, a brakesman was killed in a shunting accident at the station.

== Facilities ==
The station has very basic facilities, including a modern waiting shelter, a help point, a small car park and bike racks. As there are no facilities to purchase tickets, passengers must buy one in advance, or from the guard on the train.

== Passenger volume ==
Passenger Volume at Newtonmore
	2004–05	2005–06	2006–07	2007–08	2008–09	2009–10	2010–11	2011–12	2012–13	2013–14	2014–15	2015–16	2016–17	2017–18	2018–19	2019–20	2020–21	2021–22	2022–23	2023–24	2024–25
Entries and exits	5,396	6,815	6,631	7,060	7,446	7,972	9,484	9,406	8,958	8,326	8,636	9,432	8,770	9,194	7,848	7,456	1,498	5,400	6,470	8,484	8,454

The statistics cover twelve month periods that start in April.

== Services ==
In the May 2026 timetable, on weekdays and Saturdays, the station is served by 5 trains per day northbound to Inverness; and 4 southbound to Glasgow Queen Street and 1 to Edinburgh. On Sundays, it is served by 3 trains northbound to Inverness (including 1 extended to Elgin), and 1 train to Glasgow and Edinburgh each, as well as a southbound LNER train service to London King's Cross. The Caledonian Sleeper serves the station six nights per week.

Preceding station	National Rail	Following station
Blair Atholl	London North Eastern Railway; Sunday, Southbound Only; East Coast Main Line	Kingussie
Dalwhinnie or Blair Atholl or Pitlochry	ScotRail; Highland Main Line	Kingussie
Dalwhinnie	Caledonian Sleeper; Highland Caledonian Sleeper	Kingussie
	Historical railways	
Dalwhinnie; Line and station open	Highland Railway; Inverness and Perth Junction Railway	Kingussie; Line and station open
