= Dalwhinnie railway station =

Railway station in Highland, Scotland

Dalwhinnie Scottish Gaelic: Dail Chuinnidh
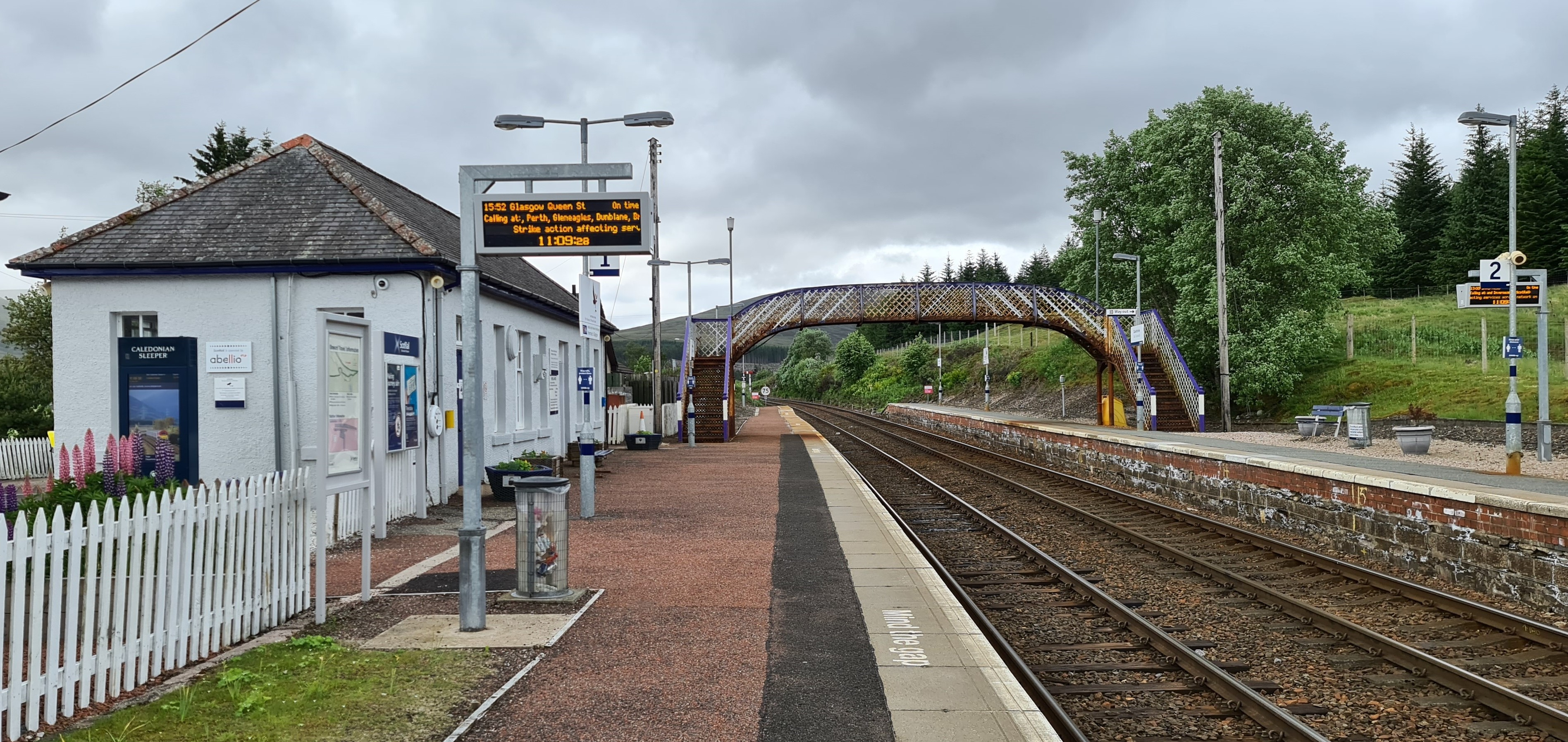
- The footbridge and station buildings at Dalwhinnie

General information
- Location: Dalwhinnie, Highland; Scotland
- Coordinates: 56.9351°N 4.2463°W
- Grid reference: NN634848
- Manager: ScotRail
- Platforms: 2

Other information
- Station code: DLW

History
- Original company: Inverness and Perth Junction Railway
- Pre-grouping: Highland Railway
- Post-grouping: LMS

Key dates
- 9 September 1863: Opened

Passengers
- 2021/22: ▲1,960
- 2022/23: ▲2,832
- 2023/24: ▲3,340
- 2024/25: ▲3,356
- 2025/26: ▼3,254
Location
Notes
- Passenger statistics from the Office of Rail and Road

Dalwhinnie railway station is a railway station serving the village of Dalwhinnie, Highland, Scotland. The station is managed by ScotRail and is on the Highland Main Line, 58 miles 47 chains (94.3 km) from Perth, between Blair Atholl and Newtonmore. There is a crossover at the south end of the station to allow trains to turn back if the line north to Newtonmore is closed.

== History ==
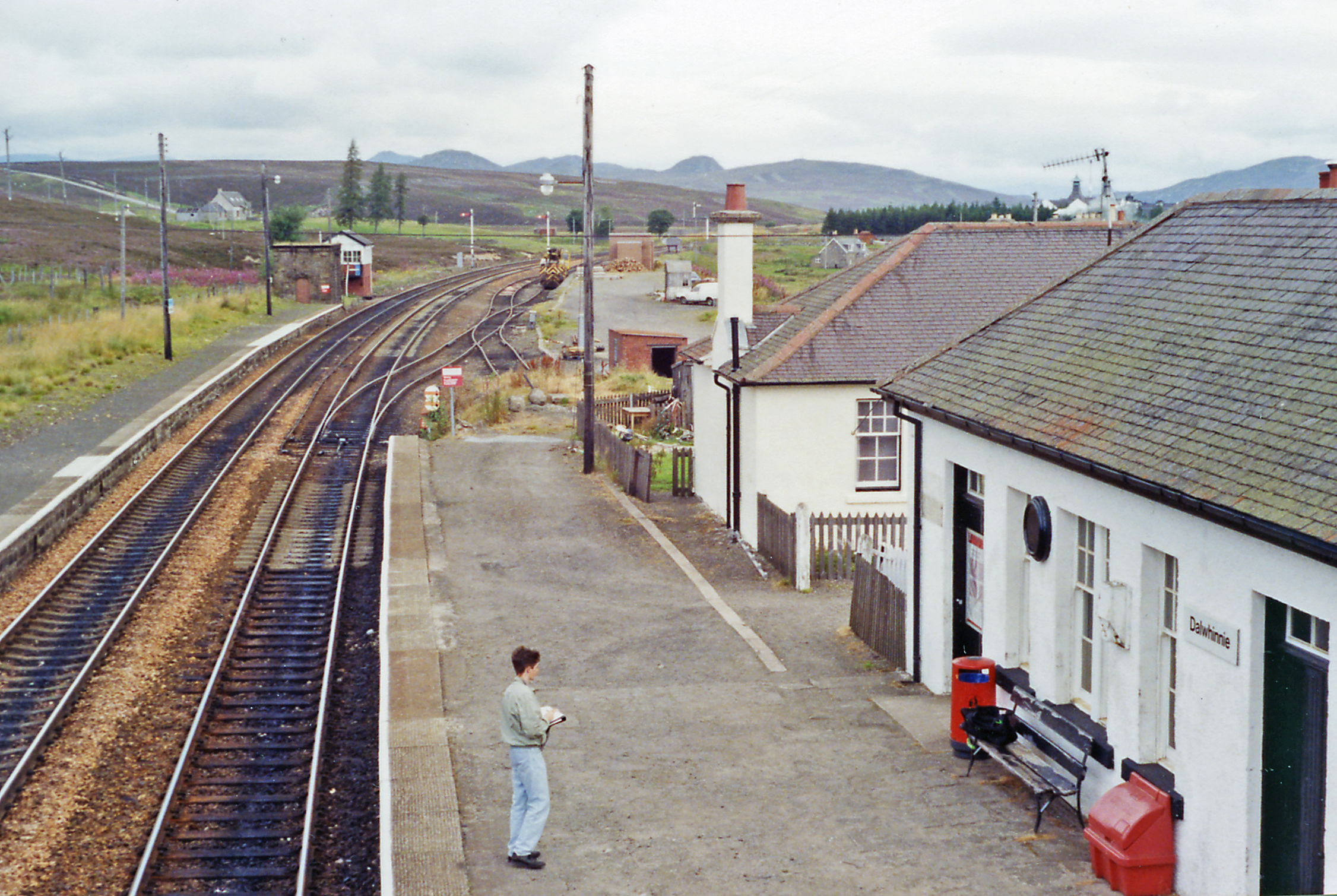
Looking north from the station footbridge in 1991

The station opened in 1863. The station buildings were completed in 1864 by Joseph Mitchell & Company.

Although the line was reduced to a single track under the Beeching cuts, redoubling was completed between 1976 and 1977.

=== Accidents and incidents ===
In early March 1881, during a severe snow storm a passenger train was stranded for 20 hours two miles from Dalwhinnie. Employees of the railway company were dispatched to the Dalwhinnie Hotel to procure food and refreshments for the passengers, but the gale and drift were so severe that the effort failed. In the darkness the employees failed to reach the hotel. Eventually the employees escorted the 15 passengers in daylight two miles to the hotel but it took them two hours. Some passengers chose to remain on the train but as there was no relief in the weather, and the train being completely covered by snow by the next day, they too were escorted to the hotel.

On 4 July 1927 the body of the station master, William Maclaren was found in the burned out station buildings. He had sustained a bullet wound to the head.

In 1938, John Ross joined a train from Dalwhinnie. He leaned out of the window and waved to friends on the platform. He failed to observe a water tank at the side of the line and the protruding hose hanging from the tank struck him and he was pulled out of the carriage window and fell onto the line. He suffered a fractured leg and other injuries and was treated at the Royal Northern Infirmary.

On 10 April 2021, an HST derailed near Dalwhinnie. The line between Aviemore and Pitlochry was closed.

== Facilities ==
Dalwhinnie has very basic facilities, being a small car park and bike racks adjacent to platform 1, benches on both platforms and a waiting shelter (within which there is also a payphone) on platform 1. There is step-free access to platform 1 only: platform 2 can only be accessed from the footbridge. As there are no facilities to purchase tickets, passengers must buy one in advance, or from the guard on the train.

== Platform layout ==
It has a passing loop 35 chains (700 m) long, flanked by two platforms. Platform 1 on the southbound line can accommodate trains having five coaches, whereas platform 2 on the northbound line can hold nine. The passing loop continues south towards Blair Atholl as double-track line.

== Passenger volume ==
Passenger Volume at Dalwhinnie
	2004–05	2005–06	2006–07	2007–08	2008–09	2009–10	2010–11	2011–12	2012–13	2013–14	2014–15	2015–16	2016–17	2017–18	2018–19	2019–20	2020–21	2021–22	2022–23	2023–24	2024–25
Entries and exits	1,619	2,013	1,774	1,975	2,296	2,208	1,894	1,984	2,172	2,472	2,460	2,392	3,188	3,372	3,368	3,226	614	1,960	2,832	3,340	3,356

The statistics cover twelve month periods that start in April.

== Services ==
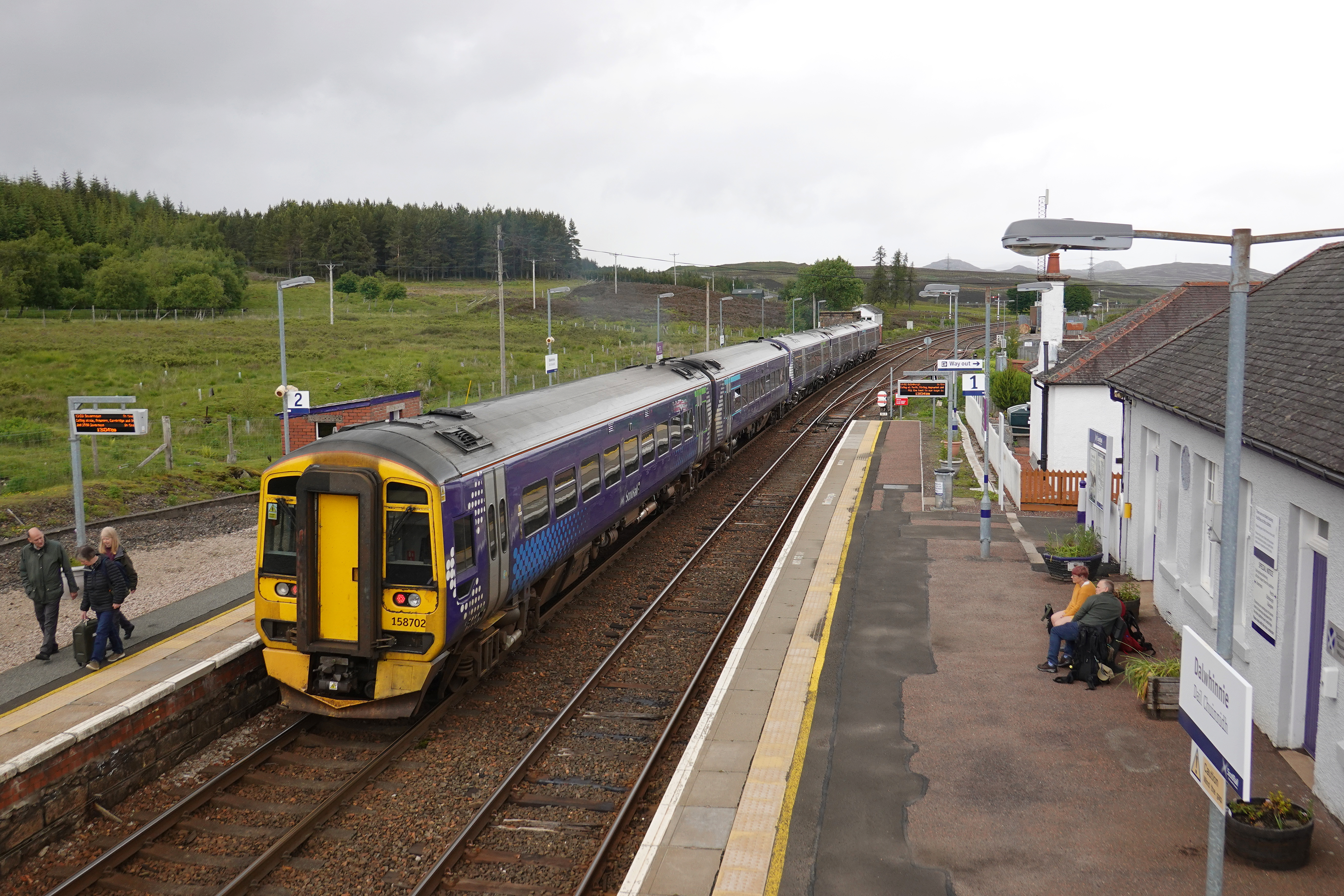
A ScotRail service leaving the station

As of May 2026, there are five daily departures in each direction on weekdays and Saturdays to Inverness, and 5 southbound (1 to Edinburgh and 4 to Glasgow Queen Street). On Sundays, there are only three trains northbound to Inverness (one of which extends to Elgin), and two south to Edinburgh. The Caledonian Sleeper between Inverness and London Euston also calls here six nights per week.

Preceding station	National Rail	Following station
Blair Atholl or Pitlochry	ScotRail; Highland Main Line	Newtonmore or Kingussie
Blair Atholl	Caledonian Sleeper (Highland Caledonian Sleeper)	Newtonmore
	Historical railways	
Dalnaspidal; Line open; station closed	Highland Railway; Inverness and Perth Junction Railway	Newtonmore; Line and station open

== Bibliography ==
- Brailsford, Martyn, ed. (December 2017) [1987]. Railway Track Diagrams 1: Scotland & Isle of Man (6th ed.). Frome: Trackmaps. ISBN 978-0-9549866-9-8.
- Butt, R. V. J. (October 1995). The Directory of Railway Stations: details every public and private passenger station, halt, platform and stopping place, past and present (1st ed.). Sparkford: Patrick Stephens Ltd. ISBN 978-1-85260-508-7. OCLC 60251199. OL 11956311M.
- Jowett, Alan (March 1989). Jowett's Railway Atlas of Great Britain and Ireland: From Pre-Grouping to the Present Day (1st ed.). Sparkford: Patrick Stephens Ltd. ISBN 978-1-85260-086-0. OCLC 22311137.
