= The Old Mill Inn =

Public house in Perth, Scotland

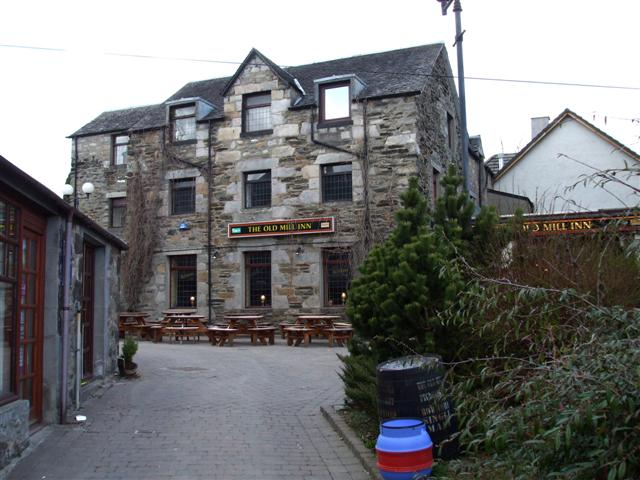
- The building in 2008
- Interactive map of the The Old Mill Inn area

General information
- Type: Public house
- Location: Mill Lane, Pitlochry; Perth and Kinross, Scotland
- Coordinates: 56°42′13″N 3°44′03″W
- Completed: 18th century
- Owner: Angus John MacLellan; Fiona MacLellan (since June 2012)

Other information
- Public transit: Pitlochry

Website
- https://www.theoldmillpitlochry.co.uk/

The Old Mill Inn is a public house and country inn in Pitlochry, Perth and Kinross, Scotland. A former gristmill dating to the 18th century, it won the Scottish Inn of the Year in 2016. It has won several other awards.

The building still has a functioning water wheel.
