= Pitlochry railway station =

Railway station in Perth and Kinross, Scotland

Pitlochry Scottish Gaelic: Baile Chloichridh
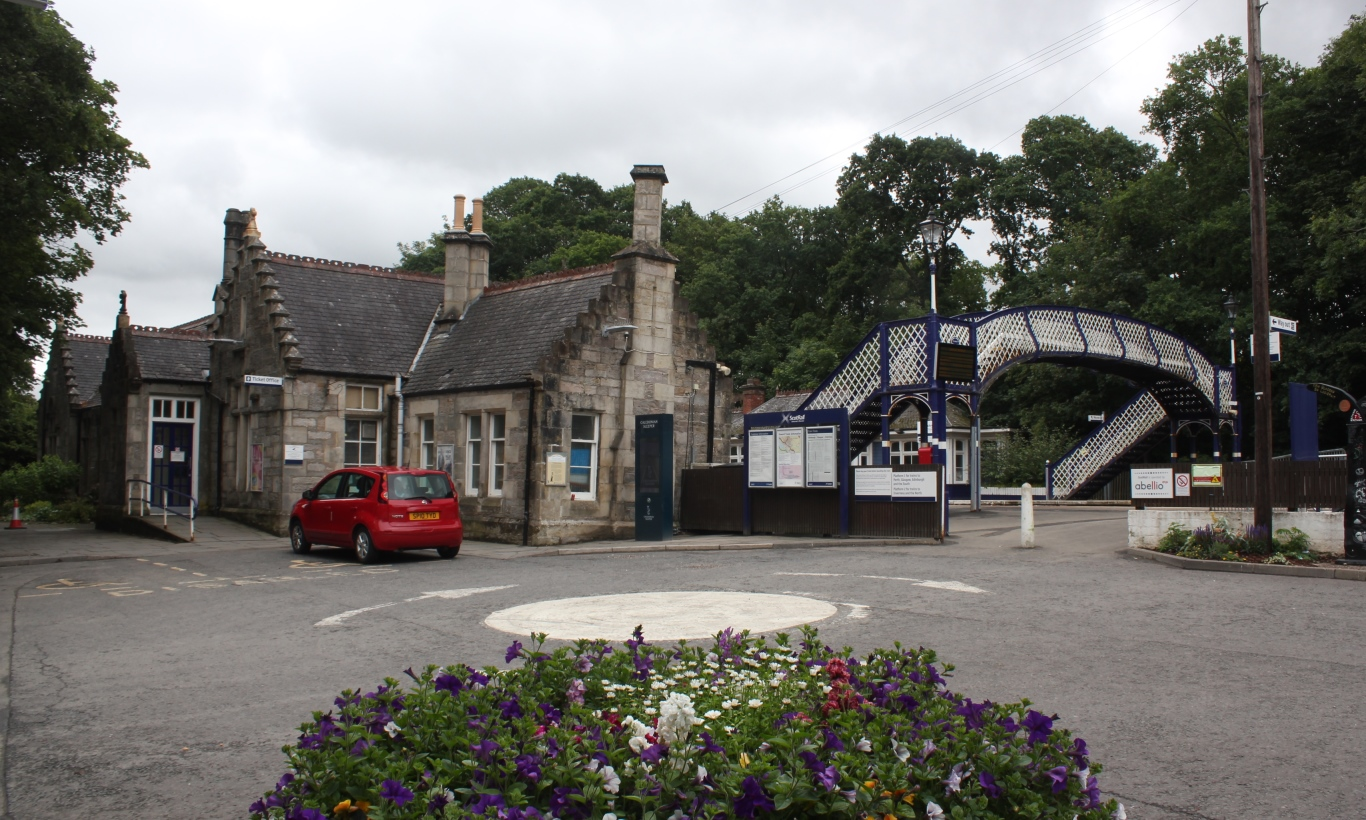

General information
- Location: Pitlochry, Perth and Kinross; Scotland
- Coordinates: 56.7023°N 3.7353°W
- Grid reference: NN938580
- Manager: ScotRail
- Platforms: 2

Other information
- Station code: PIT

Key dates
- 1863: Opened

Passengers
- 2020/21: ▼22,450
- 2021/22: ▲84,374
- 2022/23: ▲0.106 million
- 2023/24: ▲0.125 million
- 2024/25: ▲0.131 million

Listed Building – Category A
- Designated: 12 October 1994
- Reference no.: LB39867
Location
Notes
- Passenger statistics from the Office of Rail and Road

Pitlochry railway station is a railway station serving the town of Pitlochry in Perth and Kinross, Scotland. It is managed by ScotRail and is located on the Highland main line, 28 miles 21 chains (45.5 km) from Perth, between Dunkeld & Birnam and Blair Atholl.

== History ==
The station is situated on the former Inverness and Perth Junction Railway (I&PJR) and was opened along with the line in 1863. In 1865, The I&PJR amalgamated with other railways to create the Highland Railway.

In 1897 the building on the north-bound platform was replaced with a more substantial building to the designs of the Engineer in Chief to the Highland Railway, William Roberts. The main block on the south-bound platform received an addition in order to extend the booking office and the stationmaster’s rooms.

The station won the Medium Station of the Year award at the National Rail Awards in 2019.

== Facilities ==
There are waiting rooms on both platforms, benches and help points on both platforms, with a small car park, ticket office and toilets available on platform 1. Access to both platforms is step-free (from the car park for platform 1 and a drop-off point for platform 2), but the only way of crossing over is via the footbridge. There is a staffed ticket office open throughout the day, however, there are no self-service ticket machines.

=== Pitlochry Station Bookshop ===
In 2006, Pitlochry Station Bookshop was opened in an unused part of the station building via ScotRail's Adopt a Station programme. The shop sells second-hand books and donates almost all of its takings to a set of charities, which is made possible by ScotRail not charging rent for the premises and the shop being entirely staffed by volunteers. As of 2026 the shop has donated over £500,000.

== Platform layout ==
The station has a passing loop 25 chains (500 m) long, with two side platforms. Platform 1 on the southbound line could accommodate trains having eight coaches, whereas platform 2 on the northbound line could hold eleven. Both platforms were extended in March 2019 as part of a £57 million upgrade programme by Network Rail, which also saw the station re-signalled.

== Passenger volume ==
Passenger Volume at Pitlochry
	2004–05	2005–06	2006–07	2007–08	2008–09	2009–10	2010–11	2011–12	2012–13	2013–14	2014–15	2015–16	2016–17	2017–18	2018–19	2019–20	2020–21	2021–22	2022–23	2023–24	2024–25
Entries and exits	84,555	88,638	78,193	78,776	82,784	87,210	87,684	90,618	98,340	101,902	112,496	121,168	121,342	125,264	125,006	121,060	22,450	84,374	105,586	125,486	131,400

The statistics cover twelve month periods that start in April.

== Services ==
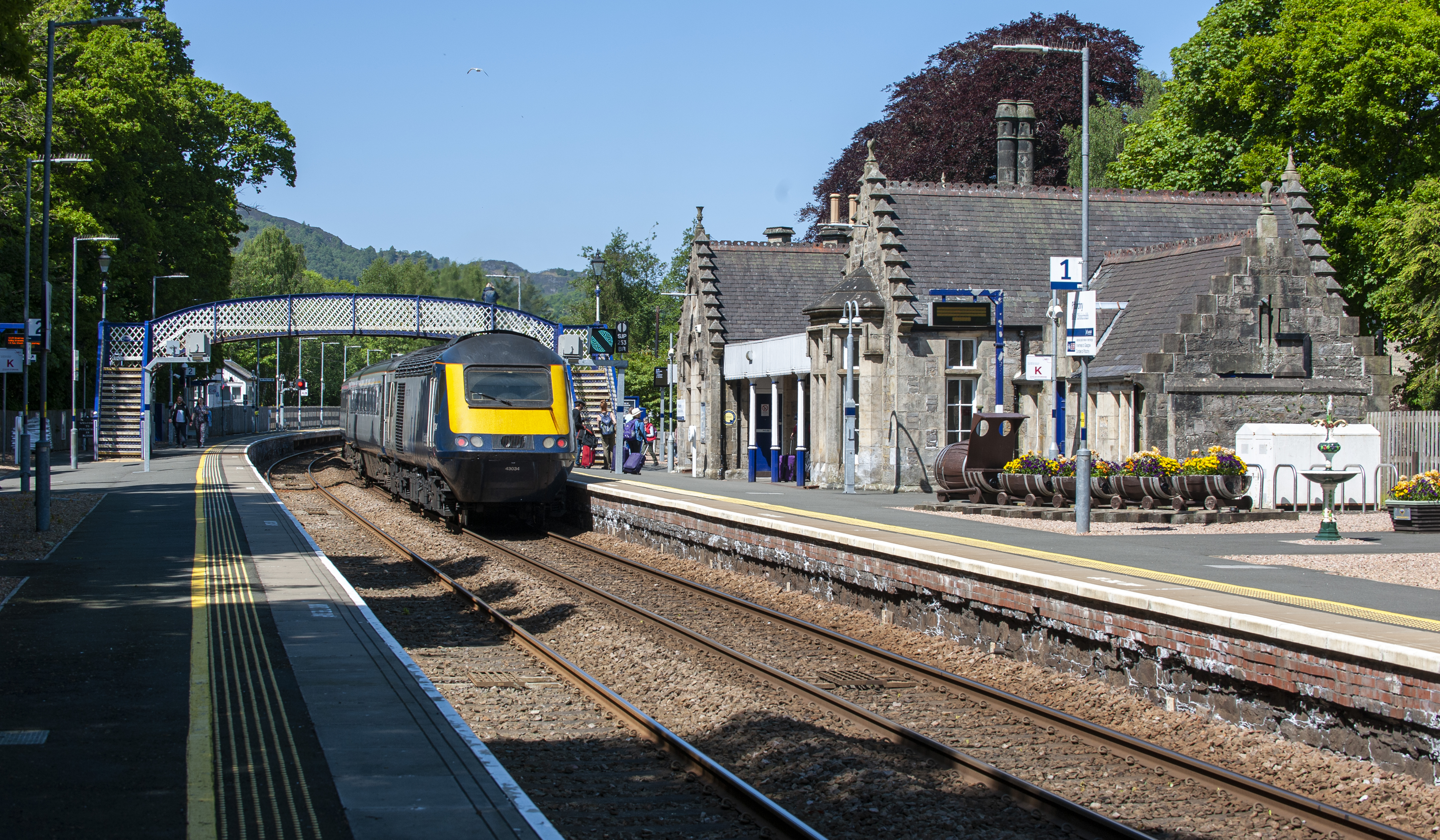
A Class 43 high-speed train at platform 1, going north

In the May 2026 timetable, all Highland main line services between Perth and Inverness call here. From Monday to Saturday, there are six trains each weekday to Edinburgh Waverley (including the Highland Chieftain to London King's Cross) and to Glasgow Queen Street southbound. Northbound there are twelve departures to Inverness. On Sundays there are five trains to Edinburgh (including the King's Cross service) and two to Glasgow, along with seven to Inverness, two of which extend to Elgin. The Caledonian Sleeper to London Euston picks up passengers here, six nights per week.

Preceding station	National Rail	Following station
Dunkeld & Birnam or Perth	London North Eastern Railway; East Coast Main Line	Blair Atholl or Kingussie
Dunkeld & Birnam or Perth	ScotRail; Highland Line	Blair Atholl or Dalwhinnie or Newtonmore or Kingussie
Dunkeld & Birnam	Caledonian Sleeper; Highland Caledonian Sleeper	Blair Atholl
	Historical railways	
Ballinluig; Line open; station closed	Highland Railway; Inverness and Perth Junction Railway	Killiecrankie; Line open; station closed

== Future proposals ==
This station is planned to benefit from a package of timetable enhancements introduced by Transport Scotland and Scotrail. The current Perth to Inverness timetable will increase to hourly each way, with trains south of there running on alternate hours to Edinburgh and Glasgow. Journey times will be reduced by 10 minutes to both cities. As of May 2026, this has still not taken place.

== Community rail ==
Launched in 2015, Pitlochry is one of the eight station members of the Highland Main Line Community Rail Partnership.

== See also ==
- Public transport in Perth and Kinross
