= Kincraig railway station =

Disused railway station in Kincraig, Highland

Kincraig
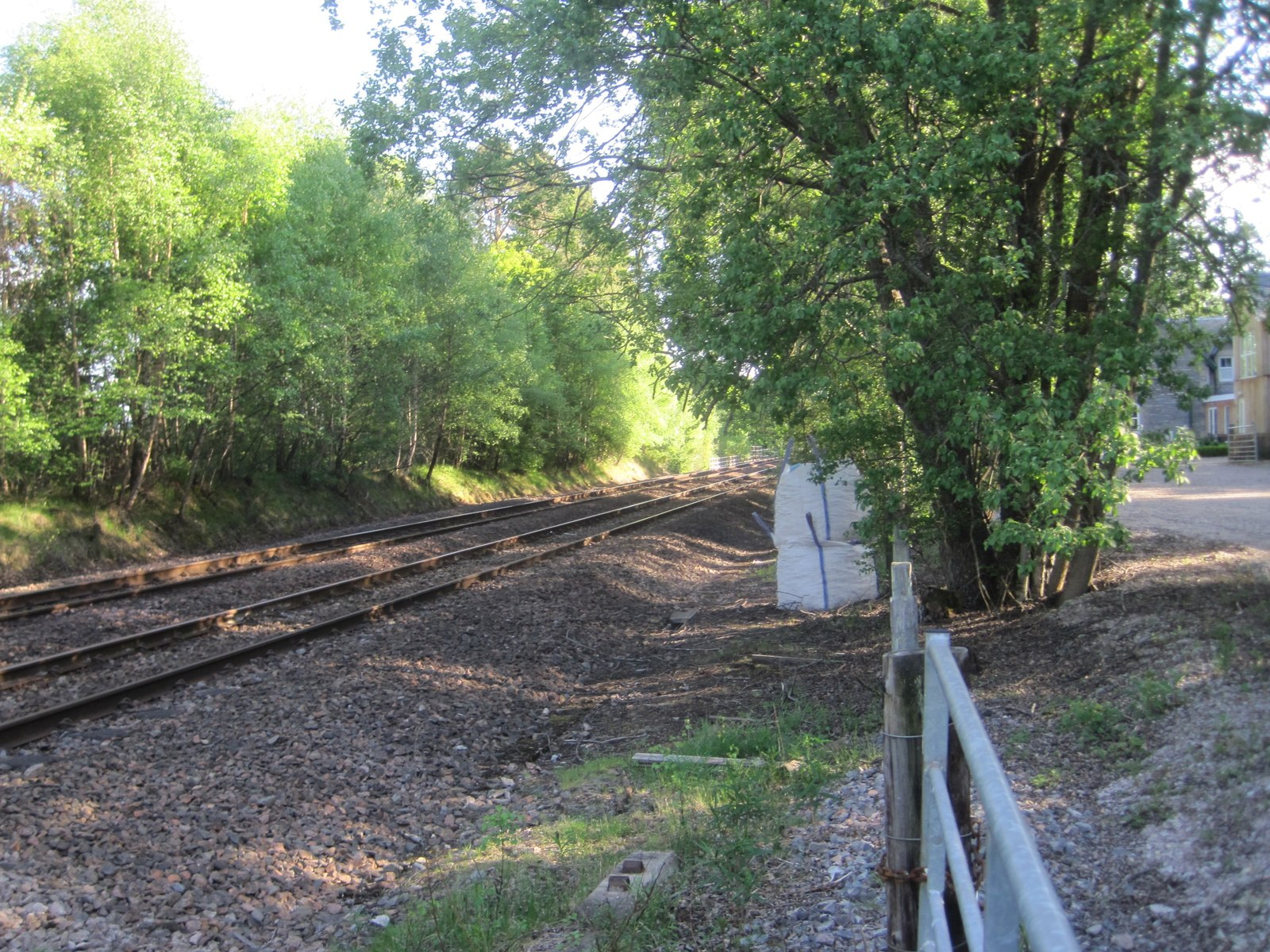
- The site of the station, looking southwest towards Kingussie, in 2017

General information
- Location: Kincraig, Highland; Scotland
- Coordinates: 57.1271°N 3.931°W
- Grid reference: NH832056
- Platforms: 2

Other information
- Status: Disused

History
- Original company: Inverness and Perth Junction Railway
- Pre-grouping: Highland Railway
- Post-grouping: London, Midland and Scottish Railway

Key dates
- 9 September 1863: Opened as Boat of Insch
- 1 September 1871: Name changed to Kincraig
- 18 October 1965: Closed
Location

Kincraig railway station served the village of Kincraig, Highland, Scotland from 1863 to 1965 on the Inverness and Perth Junction Railway.

== History ==
The station opened as Boat of Insch on 9 September 1863 by the Inverness and Perth Junction Railway, it was renamed to Kincraig on 1 September 1871.

The station was host to an LMS caravan in 1938 and 1939 and possibly also in 1937.

The station closed to both passengers and goods traffic on 18 October 1965. Most of the up platform has been removed but the footbridge has survived as have the building and wooden structure on the down platform.

Preceding station	Historical railways	Following station
Kingussie; Line and station open	Highland Railway; Inverness and Perth Junction Railway	Aviemore; Line and station open
