= Kingussie railway station =

Railway station in the Scottish Highlands

Kingussie Scottish Gaelic: Ceann a' Ghiùthsaich
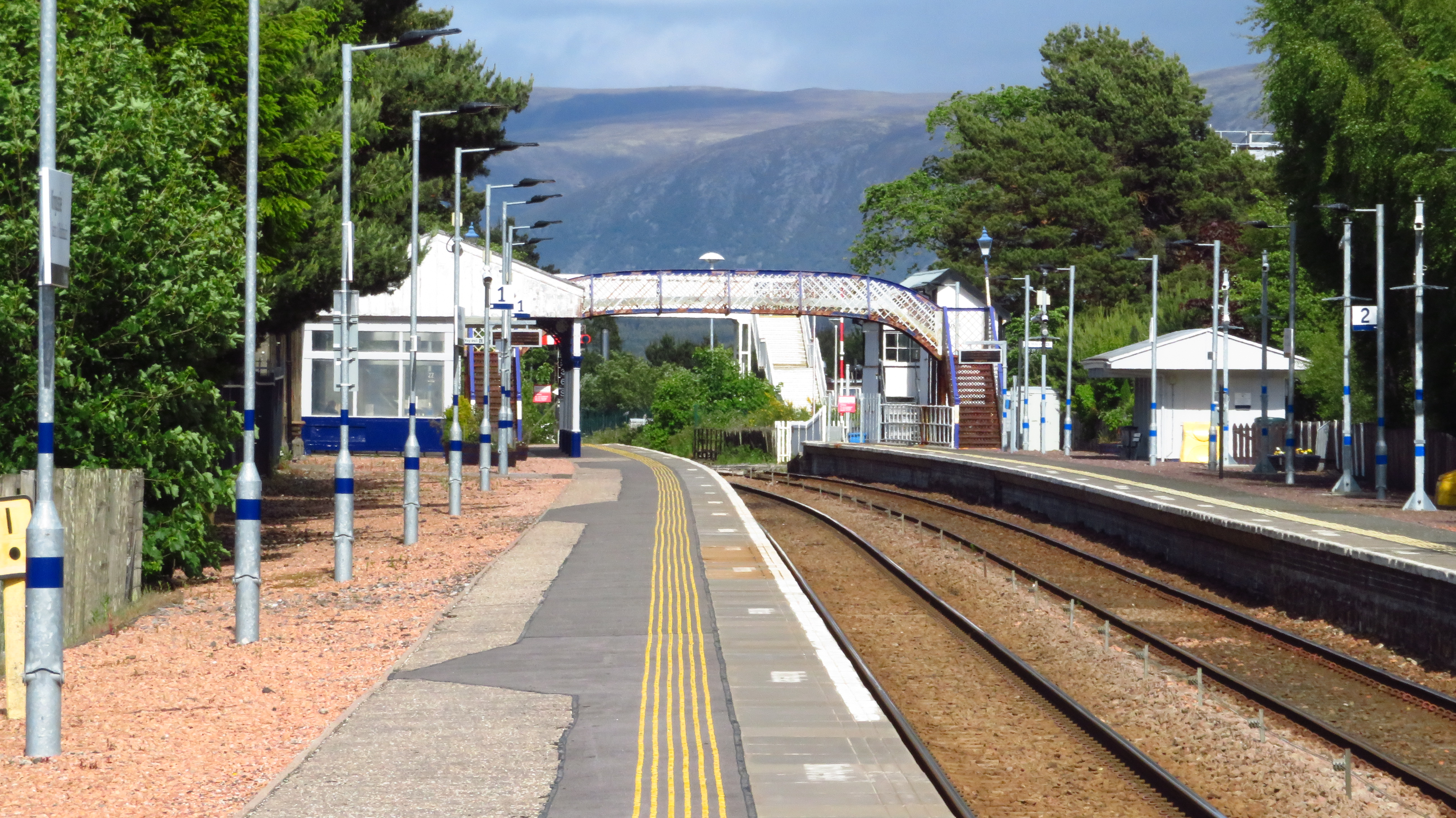
- View north towards Aviemore

General information
- Location: Kingussie, Highland; Scotland
- Coordinates: 57.0776°N 4.0543°W
- Grid reference: NH756004
- Manager: ScotRail
- Platforms: 2

Other information
- Station code: KIN

History
- Original company: Inverness and Perth Junction Railway
- Pre-grouping: Highland Railway
- Post-grouping: London, Midland and Scottish Railway

Key dates
- 9 September 1863: Station opened

Passengers
- 2021/22: ▲25,682
- 2022/23: ▲32,978
- 2023/24: ▲41,726
- 2024/25: ▲42,058
- 2025/26: ▲42,604

Listed Building – Category B
- Designated: 5 October 1971
- Reference no.: LB36282
Location
Notes
- Passenger statistics from the Office of Rail and Road

Kingussie railway station serves the town of Kingussie, Inverness-shire in the Highland Council Area of Scotland. The station is managed by ScotRail and is on the Highland Main Line, 71 miles 43 chains (115.1 km) from Perth, between Newtonmore and Aviemore.

== History ==
The Inverness and Perth Junction Railway (I&PJ) was authorised in 1861 for a line between Forres and Dunkeld. It was built quickly, and was opened in sections; the last stretch, that between Aviemore and Pitlochry, was opened on 9 September 1863; and one of the original stations was that at Kingussie. The current station buildings date from 1893 by the architect William Roberts.

The I&PJ amalgamated with other railways to form the Highland Railway (HR) in 1865, and at the 1923 Grouping the HR became part of the newly formed London, Midland and Scottish Railway. The adjacent stations were Kincraig to the north, and Newtonmore to the south, although the former has now closed.

The station was host to a LMS caravan in 1935 and 1936 followed by two caravans from 1937 to 1939. A camping coach was also positioned here by the Scottish Region from 1953 to 1963, increasing to two coaches from 1964 to 1967.

There are two platforms, both of conventional height. The Up line platform used to be at a slightly lower height; in 2017, the platform was rebuilt and resurfaced to standard height.

== Facilities ==
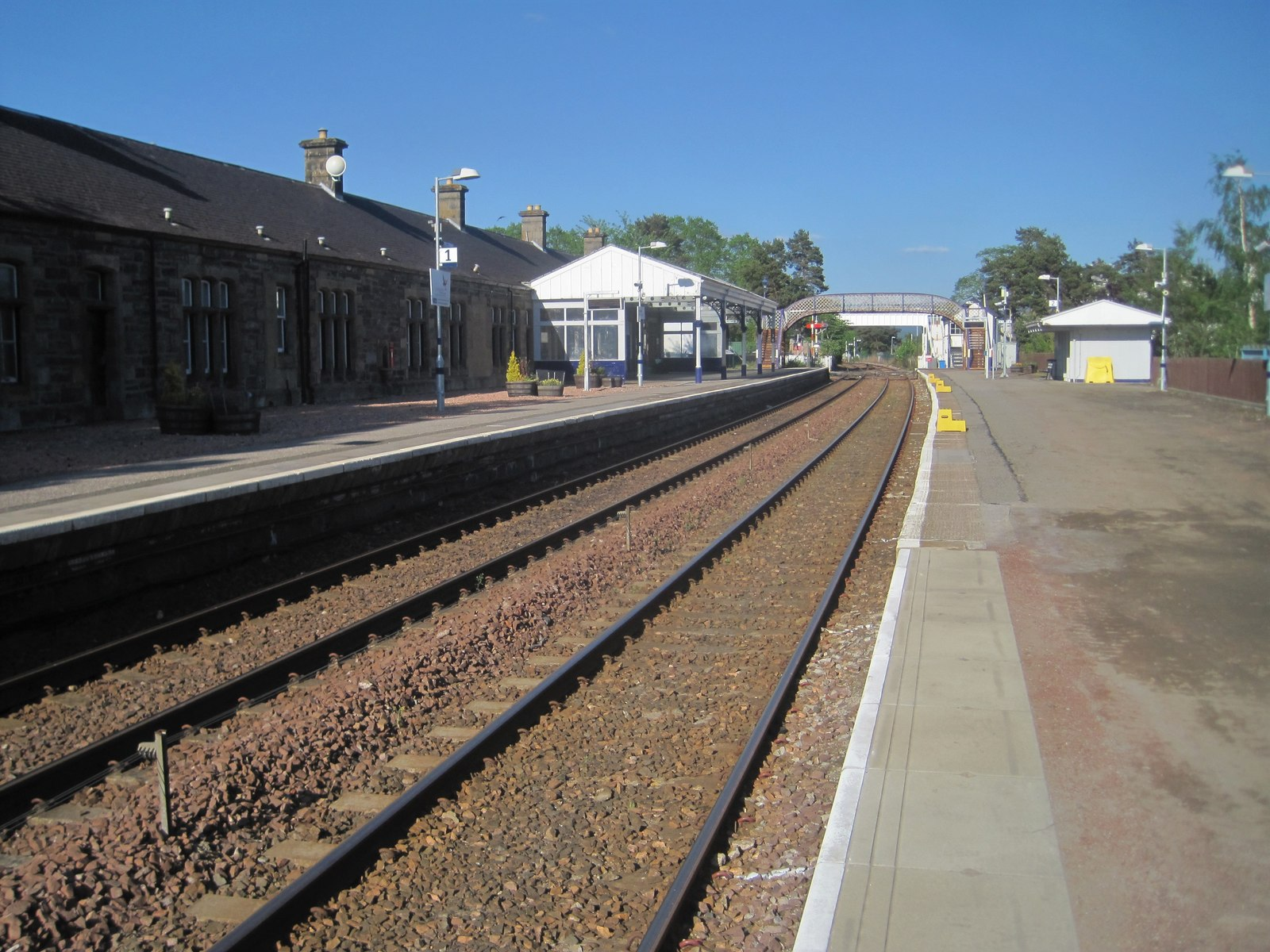
The station seen in 2017

Both platforms have benches and help points. Platform 2 has a separate waiting room, whilst shelter on platform 1 is provided by the station buildings. In the station buildings is a ticket office and toilets. Only platform 1 is step-free; platform 2 can only be accessed by the footbridge. There is a car park and cycle racks adjacent to platform 1.

In September 2023, a new accessible footbridge received planning permission.

== Platform layout ==
The station is on the mainly single-track line from Inverness to Perth, and has a passing loop 33 chains (660 m) long, flanked by two platforms. Platform 1 on the northbound line can accommodate trains having twelve coaches, whereas platform 2 on the southbound line can hold thirteen.

== Passenger volume ==
Passenger Volume at Kingussie
| | 2004–05 | 2005–06 | 2006–07 | 2007–08 | 2008–09 | 2009–10 | 2010–11 | 2011–12 | 2012–13 | 2013–14 | 2014–15 | 2015–16 | 2016–17 | 2017–18 | 2018–19 | 2019–20 | 2020–21 | 2021–22 | 2022–23 | 2023–24 | 2024–25 |
|---|---|---|---|---|---|---|---|---|---|---|---|---|---|---|---|---|---|---|---|---|---|
| Entries and exits | 27,725 | 30,045 | 32,135 | 33,416 | 38,054 | 35,838 | 38,544 | 40,298 | 40,954 | 41,400 | 42,522 | 42,850 | 44,200 | 44,736 | 40,758 | 39,254 | 7,352 | 25,682 | 32,978 | 41,726 | 42,058 |

The statistics cover twelve month periods that start in April.

== Services ==
In the May 2026 timetable, there are six trains each weekday to both Edinburgh Waverley (including the Highland Chieftain to London King's Cross) and Glasgow Queen Street southbound, plus the overnight sleeper to London Euston, six nights per week. Northbound there are twelve departures to Inverness. On Sundays there are five trains to Edinburgh (including the King's Cross service) and two to Glasgow, along with seven to Inverness, two of which extend to Elgin.

| Preceding station | National Rail | Following station |
|---|---|---|
| Newtonmore or Pitlochry | London North Eastern Railway; Highland Chieftain | Aviemore |
| Newtonmore or Pitlochry or Dalwhinnie or Terminus | ScotRail; Highland Main Line | Aviemore |
| Newtonmore | Caledonian Sleeper; Highland Caledonian Sleeper | Aviemore |
| | Historical railways | |
| Newtonmore; Line and station open | Highland Railway; Inverness and Perth Junction Railway | Kincraig; Line open; station closed |

== Future proposals ==
This station is planned to benefit from a package of timetable enhancements introduced by Transport Scotland and Scotrail. The current Perth to Inverness timetable will increase to hourly each way, with trains south of there running on alternate hours to Edinburgh and Glasgow. Journey times will be reduced by 10 minutes to both cities. As of May 2026, this has still not taken place.
