= Highland Main Line =

Railway line in Scotland

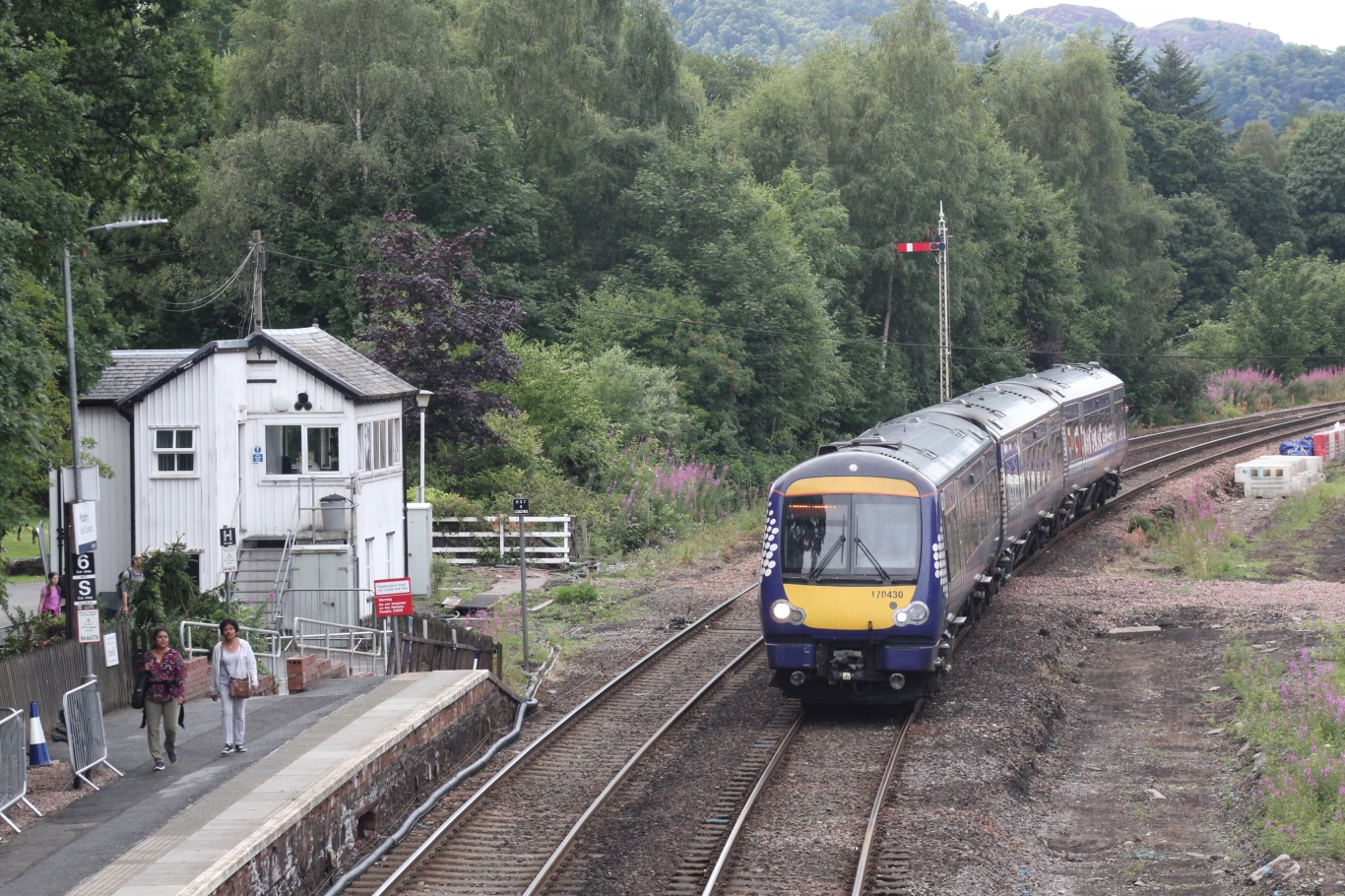
- An Abellio ScotRail train to Glasgow Queen Street approaching Pitlochry in July 2018

Overview
- Status: Operational
- Owner: Network Rail
- Locale: Perth and Kinross; Highland; Scotland
- Termini: Perth; Inverness
- Stations: 10

Service
- Type: Heavy rail
- System: National Rail
- Operator(s): ScotRail; London North Eastern Railway; Caledonian Sleeper
- Rolling stock: Class 43 "HST"; Class 158 "Express Sprinter"; Class 170 "Turbostar"; Class 73; Class 66; Mark 5 Sleeping Cars; Class 800 "Azuma"

Technical
- Line length: Perth to Inverness: 118 miles 9 chains (190.1 km)
- Track gauge: 1,435 mm (4 ft 8 1/2 in)
Route map
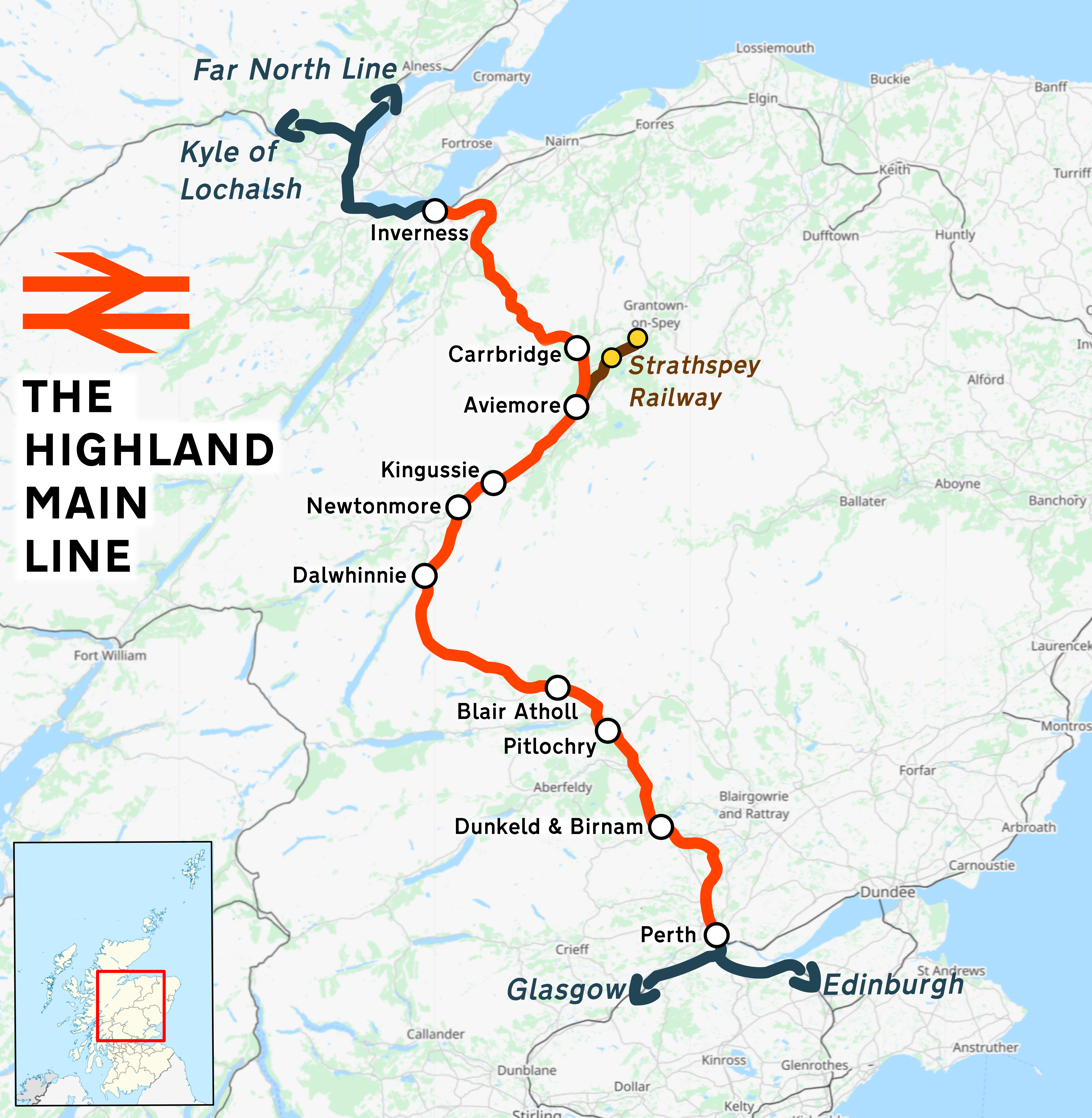
(Click to expand)

The Highland Main Line is a railway line in Scotland. It is 118 mi (190 km) long and runs through the central Scottish Highlands, mainly following the route of the A9, and linking a series of small towns and villages with Perth at one end and Inverness at the other. Today, services between Inverness and Edinburgh, Glasgow and London use the line. At Inverness the line connects with the Far North Line, the Aberdeen-Inverness Line and the Kyle of Lochalsh Line.

Much of the Highland Main Line is single track, and trains coming in opposite directions are often timed to arrive at stations at the same time, where crossing loops permit them to pass. Journey times between Inverness and Edinburgh or Glasgow are approximately three and a half hours.

== History ==
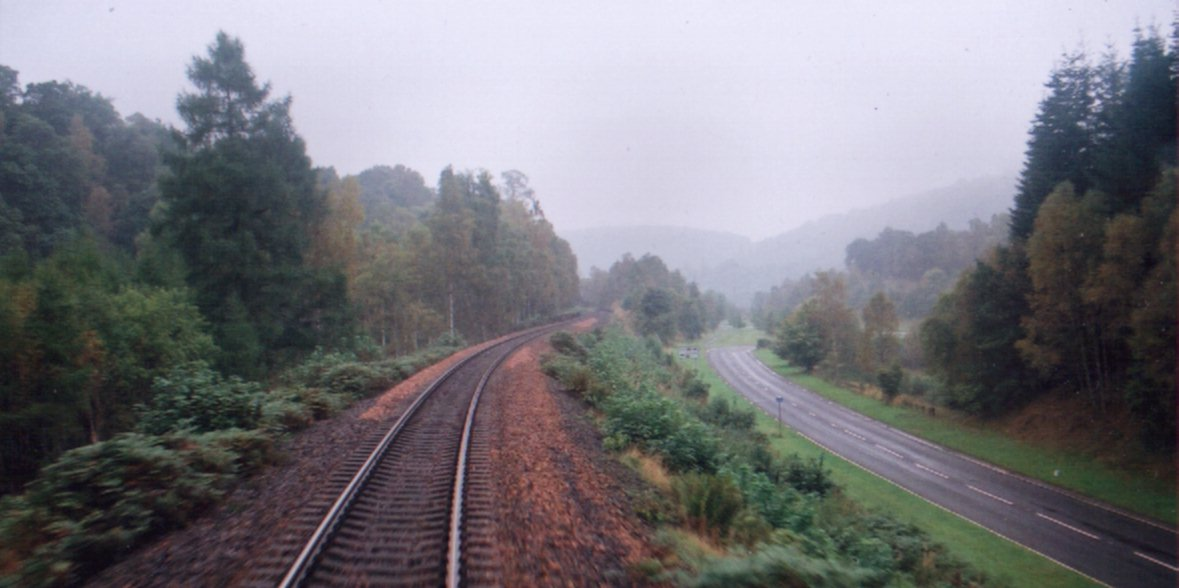
Highland Main Line and A9 next to each other in Perthshire, September 2000

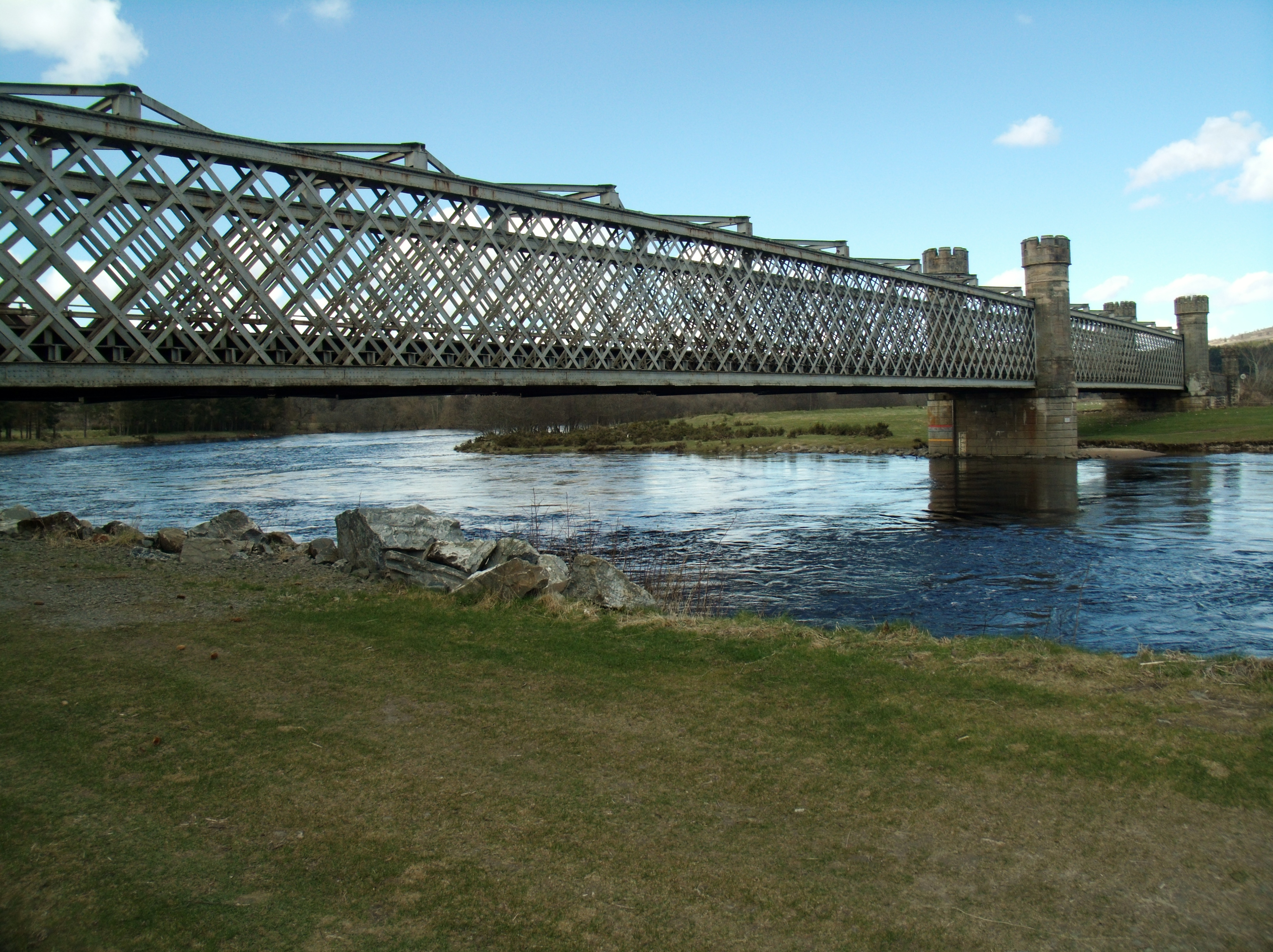
The line crosses the Dalguise Viaduct

The vast majority of the line was built and operated by the Highland Railway, with a small section of the line between Perth and Stanley built by the Scottish Midland Junction Railway, amalgamated with the Aberdeen Railway to become the Scottish North Eastern Railway in 1856, and then absorbed by the Caledonian Railway in 1866, which itself amalgamated with the Highland Railway and several others to create the LMS at the grouping in 1923. Originally, the line between Inverness and Perth went via Forres, but the Inverness and Aviemore Direct Railway was opened in 1898 to allow for a more direct routeing.

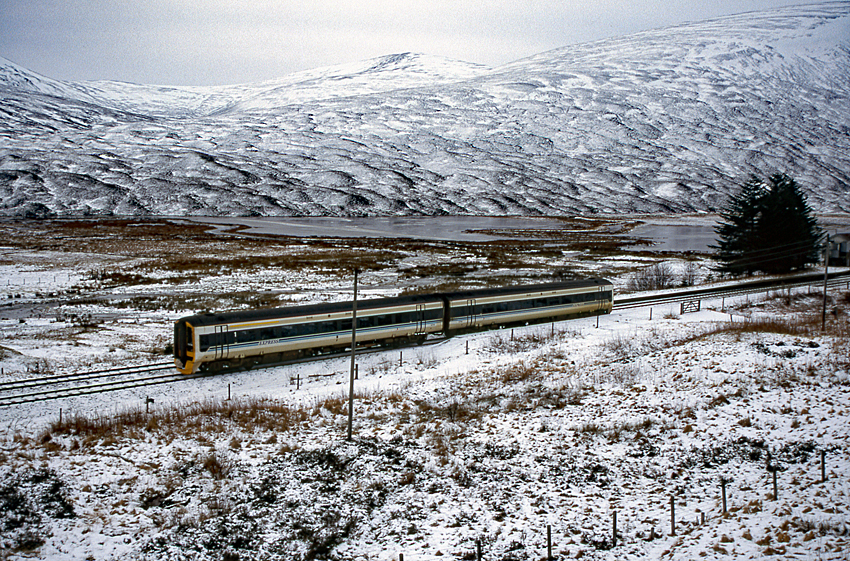
158703 heads south through the Drumochter Pass in the snow (1995)

There are two significant summits on the line: Drumochter Summit (also spelled Druimuachdar) (elevation 1,484 ft or 452 m) between Blair Atholl and Dalwhinnie, and Slochd Summit (elevation 1,315 ft or 401 m) between Carrbridge and Inverness. Other distinct features on the route include the viaducts at Culloden and Tomatin, the spectacular mountain pass at Drumochter and the severe gradients encountered in both directions, particularly the extended climb from Inverness to the Slochd summit which averages around 1 in 60 the whole way.

Initially the only double track was between Inverness and Daviot and also Stanley Junction and Perth. In the 1890s the single line working was improved with the replacement of telegraphing orders to trains along the line with staff and tablet control instruments. This was later upgraded to automatic token-exchange apparatus. However, the main improvement came with the doubling of sections of line, designed by the engineer Alexander Newlands, beginning with Blair Atholl to Dalnacardoch (8 1/4 mi or 13.5 km) in 1900, extended to Druimuachdar (8 1/2 mi or 13.5 km) in 1901 and Dalwhinnie (5 1/2 mi or 9 km) in 1909. In the 1960s, many sections of the line were converted from double track to single track. In 1976, 23 miles (37 km) from Blair Atholl to Dalwhinnie was redoubled. In March 2019 Network Rail completed a programme of works to increase capacity on the line and support the introduction of InterCity 125 sets on ScotRail services, with passing loops and platforms extended.

== Stations and services ==
As of May 2026, the stations on the line are as follows:

Places served	All trains stop?	Ordnance Survey grid reference	Notes
Perth	Yes	NO112230	
Dunkeld and Birnam	No	NO030417	Shared station
Pitlochry	Yes	NN937580	
Blair Atholl	No	NN870653	
Dalwhinnie	No	NN634848	
Newtonmore	No	NN715984	
Kingussie	Yes	NH756003	
Aviemore	Yes	NH895123	Connection with Strathspey Railway
Carrbridge	No	NH899224	
Inverness	Yes	NH667454	

Services on the line are provided by ScotRail and London North Eastern Railway. A roughly two-hourly ScotRail service operates between Perth and Inverness throughout the day. On weekdays and Saturdays, there are 12 services in each direction, all running from/to either Glasgow Queen Street or Edinburgh Waverley via Stirling.

The London North Eastern Railway service is entitled the Highland Chieftain. It departs Inverness at 07:55 (09:40 on Sundays) and runs to London King's Cross via the East Coast Main Line, arriving in London at 16:00 (18:00 on Sundays). The return working leaves London at 12:03 and reaches Inverness at 20:10. Between Inverness and Perth this service generally calls at only Aviemore, Kingussie and Pitlochry, however on Sundays the southbound service calls at all stations on the line except Dalwhinnie.

On Sundays there are 7 trains each way. The journey time between Perth and Inverness takes between 2 hours and 2 hours and 20 minutes, depending on the calling pattern and if the train is booked to be looped at any passing places.

All trains between Perth and Inverness call at Pitlochry, Kingussie and Aviemore. Most ScotRail services call at Dunkeld & Birnam (10 each way), with the stations at Blair Atholl (6 north and 5 south), Dalwhinnie (5 each way), Newtonmore (4 north and 5 south) and Carrbridge (5 north and 6 south) being served less often.

On Sundays, two northbound services continue through to Elgin, calling at Inverness Airport, Nairn and Forres.

Additionally, the Caledonian Sleeper travels overnight between Inverness and London Euston via the West Coast Main Line. The southbound train joins portions from Aberdeen and Fort William at Edinburgh Waverley, and similarly the northbound train divides there. South of Edinburgh, it forms the longest locomotive-hauled passenger train in the United Kingdom, with 16 coaches.

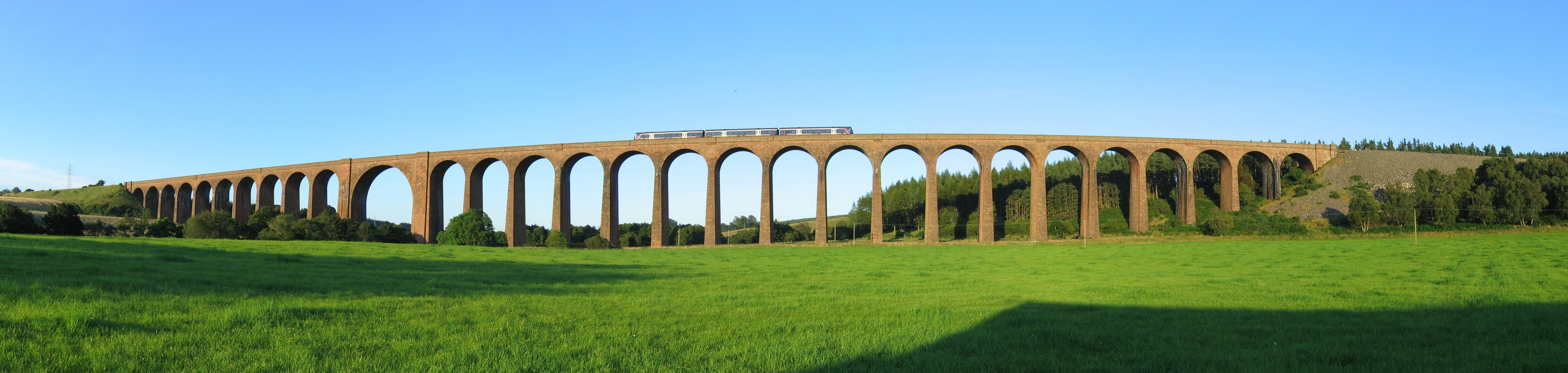
Panoramic view of the Highland Line Culloden Viaduct with a First ScotRail train crossing it

== Rolling stock ==
Class	Image	Type	Operator	Route	Maximum Speed		Builder/ built	In service on the line	Leased from	Other notes
Class	Image	Type	Operator	Route	mph	km/h	Builder/ built	In service on the line	Leased from	Other notes
43		Diesel locomotive	ScotRail	Glasgow/Edinburgh to Inverness	125	200	BREL Crewe Works 1975–1982	2018–	Angel Trains	Operates under the brand Inter7City.; Fleet consists of 9 four-coach and 17 five-coach trains.; 1 four coach train damaged in the Stonehaven derailment.
Mark 3		Passenger carriage	ScotRail	Glasgow/Edinburgh to Inverness	125	200	BREL Derby Litchurch Lane Works 1979–1980	2018–	Angel Trains	Operates under the brand Inter7City.; Fleet consists of 9 four-coach and 17 five-coach trains.; 1 four coach train damaged in the Stonehaven derailment.
66		Diesel locomotive	GB Railfreight	London Euston to Inverness (Takes over from electric loco at Edinburgh)	75	120	Electro-Motive Diesel 1998-2015	2000-	N/A	Paired with a Class 73
73		Diesel locomotive	Caledonian Sleeper	London Euston to Inverness (Takes over from electric loco at Edinburgh)	90	145	British Railways Eastleigh Works 1962; English Electric 1965-1967; Rebuilt 2014-2016	2016-	GB Railfreight	Replaced Class 67 when their lease from DB Cargo UK Expired Class 73/9. Paired with a Class 66
Mark 5 Passenger Coach		Lounge car Seated Sleeper; Sleeping car	Caledonian Sleeper	London Euston to Inverness	100	161	CAF Beasain 2016–2018	2019–	Caledonian Sleeper Rail Leasing	Replaced the Mark 2s
Mark 5 Sleeper Coach		Lounge car Seated Sleeper; Sleeping car	Caledonian Sleeper	London Euston to Inverness	100	161	CAF Beasain 2016–2018	2019–	Caledonian Sleeper Rail Leasing	Replaced the Mark 3s
158/0 Express Sprinter		DMU	ScotRail	Glasgow/Edinburgh to Inverness	90	145	BREL Derby Litchurch Lane Works 1989–1992	1990–	Porterbrook	
170/3 & 170/4 Turbostar		DMU	ScotRail	Glasgow/Edinburgh to Inverness	100	161	AdTranz/Bombardier Transportation Derby Litchurch lane Works 1998-2005	1999–	Porterbrook	
Class 800 Azuma		Bi-mode multiple unit	London North Eastern Railway	London King's Cross/Edinburgh to Inverness	125	200	Hitachi Newton Aycliffe 2014–2018	2019–	Agility Trains	Service is titled the Highland Chieftain.; Fleet consists of 10 five-coach and 13 nine-coach trains.

== Usage ==
Station usage at some stations remain stable. Overall usage on the line comparing April 2003 to April 2010 has increased 154%.

Station usage
Station name	2002–03	2004–05	2005–06	2006–07	2007–08	2008–09	2009–10	2010–11	2011–12	2012–13	2013–14	2014–15	2015–16	2016–17	2017–18	2018–19	2019–20	2020–21	2021–22	2022–23	2023–24	2024–25
Perth	641,822	694,527	700,509	763,415	886,748	888,586	929,282	959,310	975,364	988,795	1,077,598	1,077,598	1,146,000	1,081,000	1,117,248	1,112,068	1,059,278	181,454	614,804	695,276	812,220	853,236
Dunkeld and Birnam	15,406	18,810	19,339	21,897	20,856	26,010	25,436	26,178	26,506	27,862	29,924	31,050	32,022	32,878	37,982	36,930	36,608	7,740	27,444	38,416	51,290	61,270
Pitlochry	66,890	84,555	88,638	78,193	78,776	97,302	87,210	87,684	90,618	98,340	101,902	112,496	121,168	121,342	125,264	125,006	121,060	22,450	84,374	105,586	125,486	131,400
Blair Atholl	8,313	11,708	11,896	10,491	10,443	11,716	11,572	13,948	12,608	14,280	14,084	16,062	16,652	17,598	19,802	21,008	18,388	3,688	11,870	13,402	15,126	16,446
Dalwhinnie	2,066	1,619	2,013	1,774	1,975	2,644	2,208	1,894	1,984	2,172	2,472	2,460	2,392	3,188	3,372	3,368	3,226	614	1,960	2,832	3,340	3,356
Newtonmore	4,184	5,396	6,815	6,631	7,060	8,358	7,972	9,484	9,406	8,958	8,326	8,636	9,432	8,770	9,194	7,848	7,456	1,498	5,400	6,470	8,484	8,454
Kingussie	23,815	27,725	30,045	32,135	33,416	42,618	35,838	38,544	40,298	40,954	41,408	42,522	42,850	44,200	44,736	40,758	39,254	7,352	25,682	32,978	41,726	42,058
Aviemore	70,272	80,977	91,456	101,294	115,431	152,528	124,972	132,336	132,052	136,456	141,311	150,724	152,000	145,000	147,964	138,490	132,618	25,492	92,240	112,090	130,090	123,654
Carrbridge	1,531	1,910	2,987	3,954	5,438	4,232	4,500	5,118	5,636	4,454	5,540	6,256	6,898	5,808	6,064	5,584	5,474	1,622	3,714	4,840	6,544	7,020
Inverness	721,358	822,928	873,011	915,840	975,569	1,407,600	1,070,924	1,127,718	1,180,160	1,213,382	1,282,445	1,303,662	1,307,000	1,259,000	1,238,770	1,243,338	1,214,648	231,894	753,228	974,808	1,169,550	1,172,640
The annual passenger usage is based on sales of tickets in stated financial years from Office of Rail and Road estimates of station usage. The statistics are for passengers arriving and departing from each station and cover twelve-month periods that start in April. Methodology may vary year on year. Usage since the period 2019–20 have been affected by the COVID-19 pandemic, especially the period 2020–23.

== Future ==
In the Scottish Government's National Transport Strategy, published in February 2020, it was stated that the line would be electrified with overhead lines by 2035.
