= Perth railway station (Scotland) =

Railway station in Perth and Kinross, Scotland

Perth Scottish Gaelic: Peairt
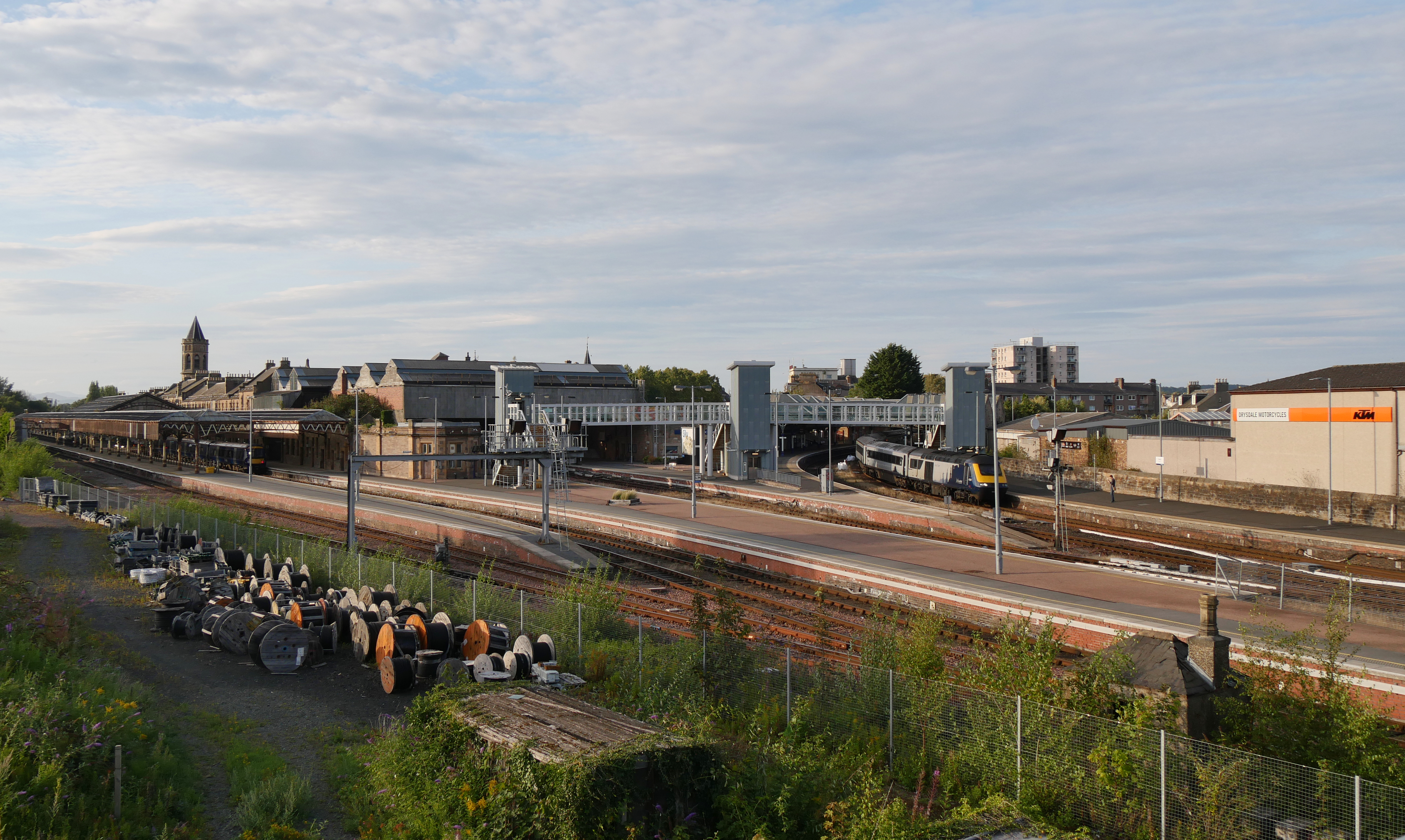
- Looking north in 2025

General information
- Location: Perth, Perth and Kinross, Scotland
- Coordinates: 56.3916°N 3.4384°W
- Grid reference: NO112231
- Manager: ScotRail
- Platforms: 7

Other information
- Station code: PTH

History
- Original company: Scottish Central Railway and Scottish Midland Junction Railway
- Pre-grouping: Caledonian Railway
- Post-grouping: London Midland and Scottish Railway

Key dates
- 22 May 1848: Opened as Perth General
- 1952: Renamed Perth

Passengers
- 2020/21: ▼0.181 million
- Interchange: ▼15,491
- 2021/22: ▲0.615 million
- Interchange: ▲56,960
- 2022/23: ▲0.695 million
- Interchange: ▲0.119 million
- 2023/24: ▲0.812 million
- Interchange: ▼99,349
- 2024/25: ▲0.853 million
- Interchange: ▲0.111 million

Listed Building – Category B
- Designated: 26 August 1977
- Reference no.: LB39340
Location
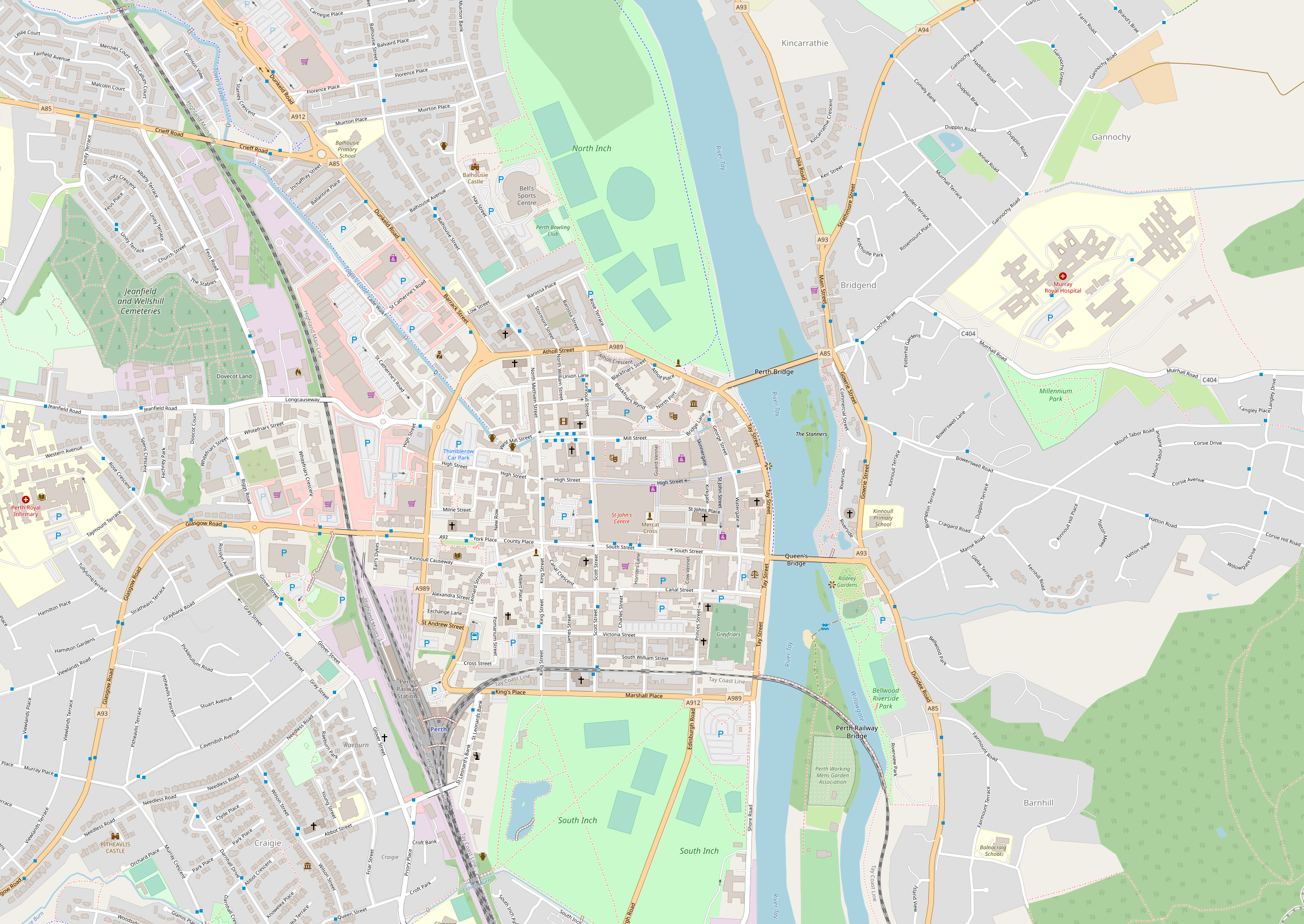
- Location within Perth
Notes
- Passenger statistics from the Office of Rail and Road

Perth railway station serves the city of Perth, Scotland. It lies on both the Glasgow–Dundee line and the Highland Main Line. It is managed by ScotRail, which provides the majority of services, with London North Eastern Railway and the Caledonian Sleeper. It is sited 151 miles 25 chains (243.5 km) from Carlisle, via Stirling, Cumbernauld and Motherwell; and 86 miles 77 chains (140 km) from Edinburgh Waverley, via Kirkcaldy and Inverkeithing.

== History ==
The original entrance to the station, pictured around 1900 and viewed from Leonard Street. The Station Hotel is on the right

North British Railway (Perth Station) Act 1864
- Act of Parliament
- Parliament of the United Kingdom
- Long title: An Act to sanction an Agreement between the North British Railway Company and the Scottish Central Railway Company with respect to the General Station at Perth; and for other Purposes.
- Citation: 27 & 28 Vict. c. c

Dates
- Royal assent: 23 June 1864

Text of statute as originally enacted

=== Openings ===
The station was opened as Perth General Station by the Scottish Central Railway (SCR) in 1848, to a design by William Tite. Originally the terminus of the SCR main line from Greenhill Junction, near Glasgow, it soon became a junction of some importance; the arrival of the Dundee and Perth Railway from Dundee, following the completion of Tay Viaduct, a bridge across the River Tay, the Edinburgh and Northern Railway (E&NR) from Ladybank on the Fife coast and the Scottish Midland Junction Railway (SMJR) from Forfar within months.

Subsequent construction by the Perth and Dunkeld Railway (P&DR) and the Perth, Almond Valley and Methven Railway added further lines into/out of the city, with the former becoming part of what is now the Highland Main Line to Inverness. The SMJR meanwhile would become part of a through route to Aberdeen by 1856, thus giving Perth travellers easy access to all of the major Scottish cities.

All of these lines, apart from the E&NR, were eventually taken over by the Caledonian Railway; although the Highland Railway (which took over the P&DR) and North British Railway (NBR; which absorbed the E&NR) also had access by means of running powers from Stanley Junction and Hilton Junction respectively.

The NBR would subsequently open a more direct route to the Scottish capital than the Caledonian's route, via Stirling and the central lowlands, in 1890; this left the existing Ladybank line at Bridge of Earn and headed south via Glenfarg to Mawcarse, where it joined the Fife and Kinross Railway's line to Kinross. Trains could then travel via Cowdenbeath, Dunfermline and the newly opened Forth Rail Bridge to reach Edinburgh.

=== Closures ===
The Almond Valley line to Crieff and Methven was an early post-nationalisation casualty, closing to passengers in October 1951; the Ladybank service followed suit in September 1955. The major losses though came as the result of the Beeching Axe and its aftermath in the mid-to-late 1960s, with the main line to Aberdeen (that is, the ex-SMJR main line to Kinnaber Junction via Coupar Angus and Forfar) being closed to passenger traffic on 4 September 1967. Aberdeen services were thereafter routed via Dundee and the former NBR route via Montrose. The Aviemore to Forres section of the Highland Main Line had already been closed two years earlier; several local stations in the area were also shut down around this time.

A further significant, and controversial, closure came on 5 January 1970, when the main line to Edinburgh via Glenfarg, Kinross and Cowdenbeath was abandoned in favour of the older but less direct line via Stirling. The Glenfarg route had been recommended for retention and development in the Beeching Report, but its removal allowed the planned M90 motorway to occupy its former alignment in the Glenfarg area, when the motorway was built a few years later. However, the longer journey via Stirling proved unpopular with Edinburgh travellers and so, in 1975, the old E&NR line to Ladybank was reopened by British Rail to provide a slightly quicker alternative. This is the route followed by most Edinburgh services today, but the daytime and overnight trains to London (see below) still run via Stirling and Falkirk, as the line via Ladybank and Kirkcaldy is served by the Aberdeen to London King's Cross services.

== Layout ==
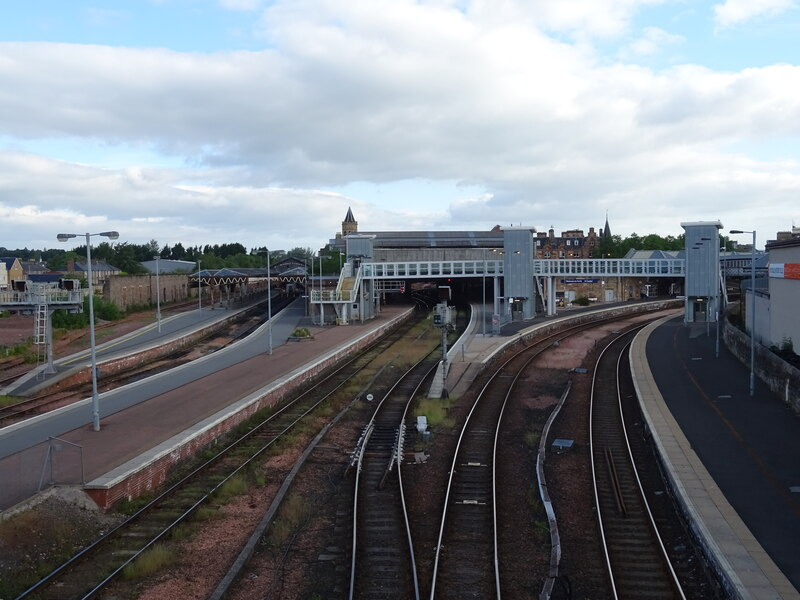
The station platforms are numbered 7 to 1, looking left to right

The station has seven active platforms, but they are split into two distinct sections:

- Platforms 1 and 2 lie on the eastern side (the old Dundee & Perth Railway part of the station); they handle the Glasgow Queen Street to Dundee and Aberdeen trains. These platforms are 20 miles 64 chains (33.5 km) from Dundee. The two platform lines then become single tracked further east to cross the bridge spanning the Tay. Platform 3, which adjoins platform 2, is a through platform that sees a few terminating services from the south, although it can be accessed from the north from the Highland Main Line.
- The remainder of the platforms (4–7) sit under the main train shed. These platforms are an island in the shape of the letter H, with two long platforms along each side - the present platforms 4 and 7. Platforms 5 and 6 are the bays at the southern end of the island. Originally, there were also two bay platforms at the northern end which are no longer used, but part of the track is now a siding for fuelling trains. These disused bay platforms are the start point for the Highland Main Line.

== Passenger volume ==
Passenger Volume at Perth
	2004–05	2005–06	2006–07	2007–08	2008–09	2009–10	2010–11	2011–12	2012–13	2013–14	2014–15	2015–16	2016–17	2017–18	2018–19	2019–20	2020–21	2021–22	2022–23	2023–24	2024–25
Entries and exits	641,822	694,527	700,509	763,415	834,726	888,586	929,282	959,310	975,364	988,795	1,077,598	1,146,382	1,081,476	1,117,248	1,112,068	1,059,278	181,454	614,804	695,276	812,220	853,236
Interchanges	66,616	68,536	78,791	79,788	98,940	107,332	115,428	95,341	103,478	113,212	118,848	126,186	121,351	130,081	134,652	105,874	15,491	56,960	118,969	99,349	110,940

The statistics cover twelve month periods that start in April.

== Services ==
In March 2016, Transport Scotland announced a package of timetable improvements for the Scottish rail network that would see:

- Additional trains operated from Perth to Glasgow, Edinburgh, Dundee and Inverness from 2018. There would be a two-hourly service between both Edinburgh & Glasgow and Inverness over the Highland Main Line, combining to give an hourly frequency north of Perth
- Additional regional services from Arbroath and Dundee to Glasgow, serving Gleneagles, Dunblane and Stirling on top of the current Aberdeen to Glasgow Queen Street services, which would be accelerated by cutting some of the existing intermediate stops.

As of May 2026, these improvements have still not taken place.

There are two main routes passing through the station: the Glasgow to Dundee and Aberdeen Line, and the Highland Main Line; there is now also a regular service to/from Edinburgh, via the Fife Coast. Trains are operated by three train operating companies (ScotRail, London North Eastern Railway and Caledonian Sleeper), which provide the general off-peak service in trains per hour/day (tph/tpd):

=== ScotRail ===
- 2 tph to Glasgow Queen Street
- 1 tph to Edinburgh Waverley
- 1 tph to Aberdeen
- 1 tph to Dundee
- 1 tph to Inverness.

=== London North Eastern Railway ===
The Highland Chieftain:

- 1 tpd to Inverness
- 1 tpd to London King's Cross.

=== Caledonian Sleeper ===
- 1 tpd to Inverness
- 1 tpd to London Euston.

Preceding station	National Rail	Following station
Gleneagles	London North Eastern Railway; East Coast Main Line	Pitlochry or Dunkeld & Birnam
Ladybank or Markinch or Gleneagles or Dunblane or Terminus	ScotRail; Highland Line	Pitlochry or Dunkeld & Birnam
Gleneagles or Dunblane or Stirling	ScotRail; Glasgow–Dundee line	Invergowrie or Dundee
Gleneagles	Caledonian Sleeper; Highland Caledonian Sleeper	Dunkeld & Birnam
	Historical railways	
Terminus	Highland Railway; Perth and Dunkeld Railway	Muirton; Line open; Station closed
Terminus	Scottish Midland Junction Railway; Caledonian Railway	Muirton; Line open; Station closed
Terminus	Dundee and Perth Railway; Caledonian Railway	Princes Street; Line open; Station closed
Forgandenny; Line open; Station closed	Scottish Central Railway; Caledonian Railway	Terminus
Bridge of Earn; Line open; Station closed	Edinburgh and Northern Railway; North British Railway	Terminus
	Disused railways	
Terminus	Perth, Almond Valley and Methven Railway; Caledonian Railway	Ruthven Road; Line partially open; Station closed

== Connections ==
Perth bus station is situated approximately 100 metres north-east along Leonard Street, part of the A989, from the railway station.

== Cultural references ==
Some scenes from the film The Railway Man were shot at Perth station: platform 3 posed as Crewe and platform 5 as Edinburgh Waverley; both were set during the 1960s.

Perth station was nominated for the Carbuncle Award in 2015, which recognises the year's worst planning decision. The award was because a new footbridge had to be built at the southern end of the station which has stair and lift access to all platforms to comply with disability laws. Local newspaper The Courier reported on the news and interviewed Paul Tetlaw from the campaign Transform Scotland. He said:

"It's an off-the-shelf structure that has desecrated the station environment, imposed from London by 'standards bound' Network Rail designers and has no fit with the largely Victorian surroundings. To add insult to injury, it's virtually unused, as the alternatives within the station building are vastly more convenient for the overwhelming majority of passengers. This tacky and inappropriate new structure is thought to have cost in excess of £1m — money which would have been better spent on opening a new station in nearby Newburgh, which has none, with cash left over for a feasibility study of recreating a direct Perth-Edinburgh link, as advocated by our inter-city express campaign."

== See also ==
- List of listed buildings in Perth, Scotland
- Public transport in Perth and Kinross

== Bibliography ==
- Awdry, Christopher (1990). Encyclopaedia of British Railway Companies. Sparkford: Patrick Stephens Ltd. ISBN 1-8526-0049-7. OCLC 19514063. CN 8983.
- Brailsford, Martyn, ed. (December 2017) [1987]. Railway Track Diagrams 1: Scotland & Isle of Man (6th ed.). Frome: Trackmaps. ISBN 978-0-9549866-9-8.
- Butt, R. V. J. (October 1995). The Directory of Railway Stations: details every public and private passenger station, halt, platform and stopping place, past and present (1st ed.). Sparkford: Patrick Stephens Ltd. ISBN 978-1-85260-508-7. OCLC 60251199. OL 11956311M.
- Jowett, Alan (March 1989). Jowett's Railway Atlas of Great Britain and Ireland: From Pre-Grouping to the Present Day (1st ed.). Sparkford: Patrick Stephens Ltd. ISBN 978-1-85260-086-0. OCLC 22311137.
