= Highland Chieftain =

British passenger train

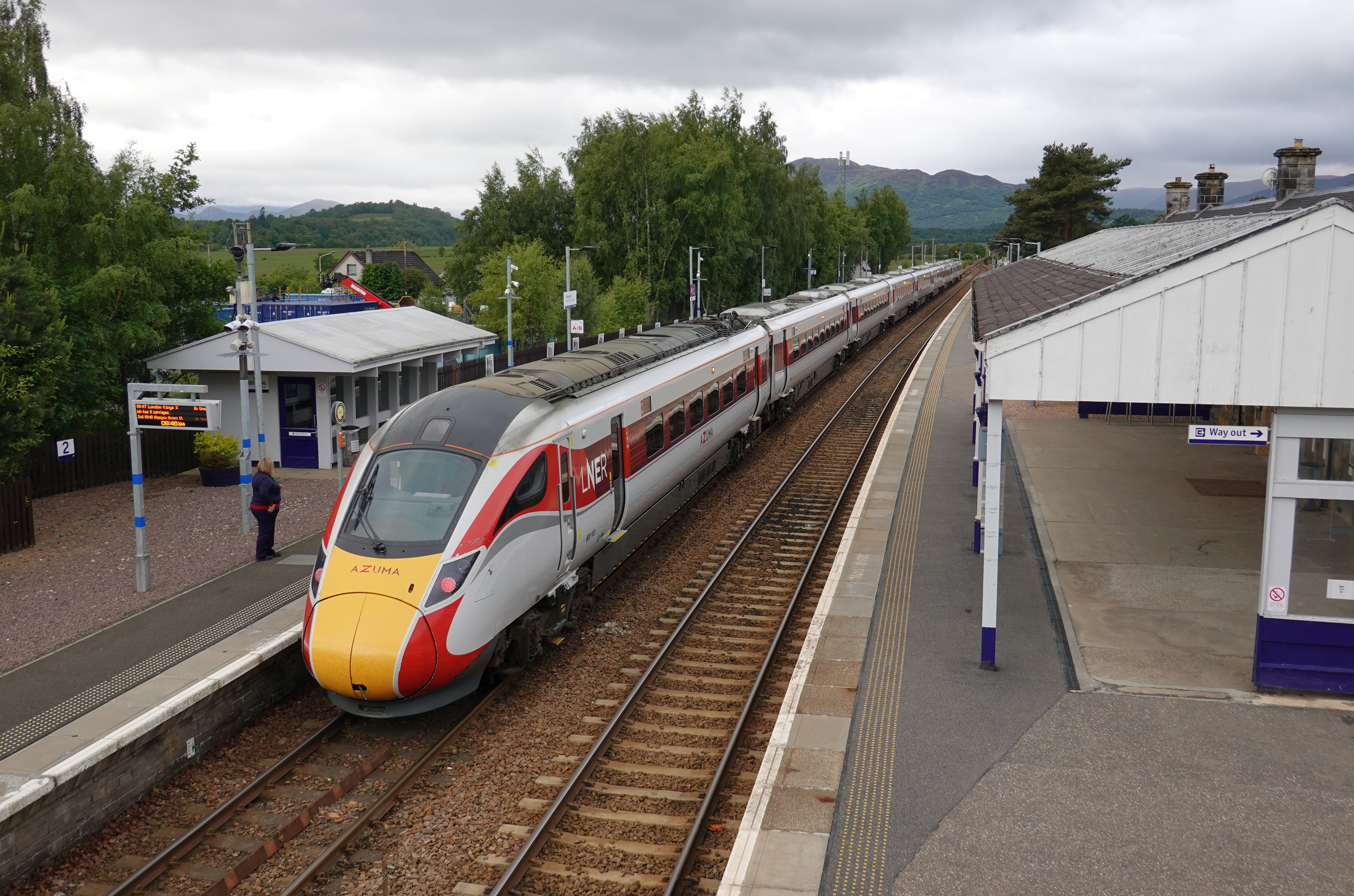
- London North Eastern Railway Class 800 Azuma at Kingussie in June 2024

Overview
- Service type: Passenger train
- Predecessor: The Clansman
- First service: 14 May 1984
- Current operator: London North Eastern Railway
- Former operators: Virgin Trains East Coast; East Coast; National Express East Coast; GNER; InterCity East Coast

Route
- Termini: London King's Cross; Inverness
- Distance travelled: 581 miles (935 km)
- Average journey time: 8 hours
- Service frequency: Daily
- Train numbers: 1W16 (northbound); 1E13 (southbound)
- Lines used: East Coast; Highland

Technical
- Rolling stock: Class 800 Azuma
- Operating speed: 125 mph (200 km/h)

The Highland Chieftain is a named British passenger train operated by London North Eastern Railway. It operates daily in each direction between London King's Cross and Inverness via the East Coast and Highland Main Line. It is one of the longest train journeys in the United Kingdom at 581 miles (935 km) with a journey time of eight hours.

== History ==
Historically, the principal train service between London and the Scottish Highlands was The Clansman, which ran via the West Coast Main Line.

The Highland Chieftain was introduced with the May 1984 timetable on the East Coast Main Line and was intended to replace The Clansman; the running time then was 8 hours 40 minutes southbound and 8 hours 50 minutes northbound. Today, it has a journey time of eight hours. Originally operated by InterCity 125 sets, the service has been operated by Class 800 Azumas since December 2019.

Electric locomotive 87023, which operated on the West Coast Main Line, was named Highland Chieftain between 1978 and 1984, but never had an association with the passenger service. LNER High Speed Train power car 43308, which has operated the service, was later named Highland Chieftain. The nameplate was auctioned by London North Eastern Railway in 2020.

== Operation ==
Presently both of the services are operated by a Class 800 Azuma. This is a bi-modal train due to the line being diesel only beyond Dunblane, with the train being on electric power to and from the latter.

Current
Family	Class	Image	Type	Top speed	
Family	Class	Image	Type	mph	km/h
Hitachi AT300	Class 800 Azuma		Bi-mode multiple unit	125	200

Until December 2019, the Highland Chieftain service was operated by an InterCity 125 HST for a number of years until the whole fleet of HSTs were replaced by the Azuma fleet.

From Sunday 14th December 2025, as part of a new LNER timetable, the Highland Chieftain service began calling at Doncaster, Newark North Gate and Peterborough.

Past
Trainset	Class	Image	Type	Top speed	
Trainset	Class	Image	Type	mph	km/h
InterCity 125	Class 43		Locomotive	125	200
InterCity 125	Mark 3		Passenger coach	125	200
