= Highlandman railway station =

Former railway station in Scotland

Coordinates: 56.3589°N 3.8104°W

Highlandman

General information
- Location: Highlandman, Perth and Kinross; Scotland
- Platforms: 1

Other information
- Status: Disused

History
- Original company: Crieff Junction Railway
- Pre-grouping: Caledonian Railway
- Post-grouping: London, Midland and Scottish Railway

Key dates
- 1856: Opened
- 1 January 1917: Closed
- 1 February 1919: open
- 6 July 1964: closed
Location

Highlandman railway station was a station southeast of Crieff in Perth and Kinross, Scotland. It was built in 1856 for the Crieff Junction Railway, which connected Crieff with the Scottish Central Railway at Crieff Junction (now Gleneagles). The CJR was absorbed by the Caledonian Railway in 1865, which itself became part of the London, Midland and Scottish in 1923.

Highlandman station was named after the drovers who passed through the area on their way between the Highlands and markets in the south.

There was no sizable community in the area. The line and station were closed on 6 July 1964, as part of the Beeching closures.

== Personnel ==
The porter was John Aitken. He and his wife lived in the house.

== Today ==
The station is now a bed and breakfast.

Preceding station	Historical railways	Following station
Strageath Halt; Line and Station closed	Caledonian Railway; Crieff Junction Railway	Pittenzie Halt; Line and Station closed
