= Braco, Perth and Kinross =

Coordinates: 56.2636°N 3.8801°W

Braco: Scottish Gaelic: Am Breac Achadh
- Location within Perth and Kinross
- Population: 540 (2020)
- OS grid reference: NN8309
- Council area: Perth and Kinross
- Country: Scotland
- Sovereign state: United Kingdom
- Post town: DUNBLANE
- Postcode district: FK15
- Dialling code: 01786
- Police: Scotland
- Fire: Scottish
- Ambulance: Scottish
- UK Parliament: Ochil and South Perthshire
- Scottish Parliament: Perthshire South and Kinross-shire

Braco (/ˈbreɪkoʊ/ BRAY-koh) is a village in Perth and Kinross, Scotland, in the historic county of Perthshire. It lies in the rural Strathallan area on the A822, approximately eight miles south of Crieff and eight miles north of Dunblane. The village is close to the A9 trunk road at Greenloaning, while Comrie lies approximately nine miles to the north-west via the B827 and Gleneagles, including Gleneagles railway station and the hotel and golf complex, lies approximately six miles to the east.

The present village was laid out on the Braco estate in the early nineteenth century and dates principally from 1815. Immediately north-east of the village is the Ardoch Roman military complex, where successive Roman forts, an annexe, a signal station and temporary camps survive as earthworks. Historic Environment Scotland describes Ardoch as the best-preserved example of a Roman fort in Scotland.

North-west of Braco, Braco Castle stands within a designed landscape included in Scotland's Inventory of Gardens and Designed Landscapes. William McGregor, who proposed the formation of the Football League in 1888, was born in Braco.

== Population ==
Braco has remained a small settlement, although its population has varied over time. The Ordnance Gazetteer of Scotland recorded populations of 394 in 1836, 337 in 1861 and 313 in 1871. John Bartholomew's Gazetteer of the British Isles gave a population of 270 in 1887.

Four housing estates were built in Braco during the 1970s, increasing the size of the village. National Records of Scotland estimated the population at 540 in mid-2020.

== Geography ==
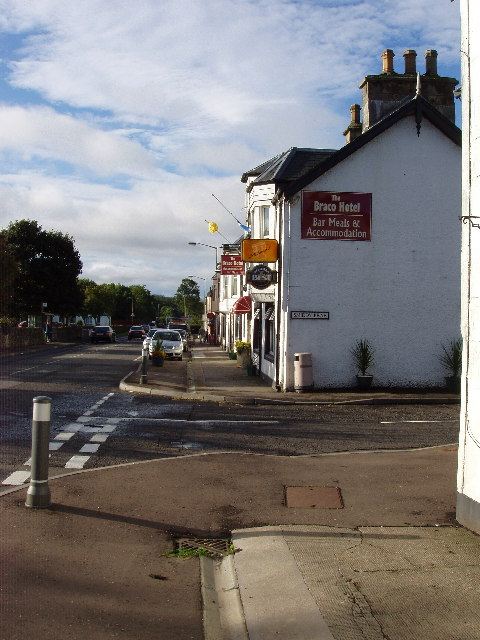
Braco's Front Street is the busy A822 linking Crieff to the A9 road

Braco occupies a rural position in southern Perthshire, between Strathallan and Strathearn. The A822 forms Front Street through the village and connects the A9 at Greenloaning with Muthill and Crieff. The B827 leaves the A822 immediately north of Braco and provides the direct road route towards Comrie; Historic Environment Scotland describes the nearby Black Hill Roman Camps as lying just beyond the junction of the A822 and the B827 Comrie road.

The River Knaik flows from the uplands south of Comrie towards Braco. Its upper catchment includes the Arrevore Burn, Corriebeagh Burn and Allt an t-Seilich, and riparian woodland becomes more frequent in its lower reaches towards the village. Braco Castle lies north-west of the village in a landscape of parkland, woodland and open hill ground.

== History ==
=== Prehistory and Roman period ===
On Grinnan Hill, south-west of Braco, are the remains of a prehistoric fort above the Keir Burn. Historic Environment Scotland dates the site broadly from the Bronze Age to the Iron Age, approximately 2200 BC to AD 400. The fort is D-shaped, measures about 95 by 85 metres and is defended by at least two systems of banks and ditches. The Roman road lies about 530 metres east of the fort and the Ardoch military complex is less than one kilometre away.

Braco lies at the southern end of the Gask Ridge, a Roman military system established during the Flavian occupation of Scotland in the first century AD. It consisted of forts, fortlets and watchtowers along the Roman road running north towards the River Tay. The Scottish Archaeological Research Framework notes that it may have been one of the earliest fortified land frontiers constructed by the Romans, although its precise function remains debated.

The main Roman site is the Ardoch military complex. Its surviving earthworks show three principal phases of fort occupation. The earliest is associated with Roman activity in the late first century AD, while later phases date to approximately AD 140 to 158 and AD 158 to 163. The rampart survives to about two metres in places and five defensive ditches remain on the northern and eastern sides. The wider complex includes an annexe, a signal station and overlapping temporary camps. North of Ardoch, the Black Hill Roman Camps include a large camp associated by Historic Environment Scotland with the campaign of Septimius Severus and Caracalla in AD 208 to 211.

=== Medieval estate and Braco Castle ===
In the medieval period, the lands around Braco belonged to the Bishops of Dunblane. In 1442, James II of Scotland confirmed a grant to Michael Ochiltree, Bishop of Dunblane, which included places recorded as Brecache, Ardachis and Kere-decani. Historic Environment Scotland identifies these with Braco, Ardoch and Deanskeir respectively.The place-name Braco is derived from the Scottish Gaelic Breac Achadh, meaning "spotted field"; Historic Environment Scotland relates the name to a field partly cleared of bracken.

Ardoch Bridge, beside the Roman fort, is traditionally dated to around 1430. The bridge was subsequently altered, including during work associated with the eighteenth-century military road, and the extent of surviving medieval fabric is uncertain.

Braco Castle developed from a tower house dating from the late sixteenth or early seventeenth century. John Graham, 3rd Earl of Montrose, granted the lands of Braco to his second son William Graham in 1585. William became known as William Graham of Braco and was created a Baronet of Nova Scotia, of Braco in the County of Perth, in 1625. He enlarged the earlier house and was the uncle of James Graham, 1st Marquess of Montrose.

By the eighteenth century the estate had passed to the Graemes of Gorthie. David Graeme (1716-1797) inherited Braco in 1736 and later served as Member of Parliament for Perthshire and as an equerry to George III. During his ownership the castle was substantially enlarged by the addition of an eastern range. Further additions were made in the nineteenth century.

=== Jacobite rising of 1715 ===
Braco was occupied by Jacobite forces after the Battle of Sheriffmuir on 13 November 1715. A contemporary account records that John Erskine, Earl of Mar, intended to move his army towards "Braco, Ardoch, and adjacents" after the battle, where provisions could be obtained and separated units could regroup. Mar wrote from "Barock" that evening in a letter to the governor of Perth in which he claimed a Jacobite victory.

Braco Castle was subsequently used as a Jacobite garrison. On 29 January 1716, a government force of about 200 dragoons, 400 infantry and two pieces of artillery approached the castle during the advance towards Perth. The garrison withdrew before the government troops arrived, and the castle was occupied without fighting.

=== Planned village and later development ===
The present village was developed as a planned settlement on the Braco estate. Local historical research used in the Braco and Greenloaning Community Profile dates its establishment to 1815. Braco marked the bicentenary of the village in 2015.

Ardoch Parish Church predates the planned village. The first minister was appointed to the chapel of ease in 1781, and Ardoch became a quoad sacra parish in 1834. After the Disruption of 1843, the minister and a majority of the Ardoch congregation joined the Free Church of Scotland. Braco Free Church opened in 1844; the later United Free church building was demolished in 1930.

By the later nineteenth century Braco had a post and telegraph office, churches, a school and a hotel. The Scottish Central Railway opened its Stirling to Perth line in 1848, with the nearest station at Greenloaning, about one mile south of Braco. The station closed to passengers in 1956.

The Braco estate was sold to James Finlay Muir in 1917. His family developed commercial flower growing on the estate, including daffodils grown for sale in Glasgow. Historic Environment Scotland records that about 20 tonnes of daffodil bulbs were brought to Braco from Tresco in the Isles of Scilly. Four housing estates were constructed in the village during the 1970s.

== Built heritage ==
=== Braco Castle and designed landscape ===
Braco Castle is a Category B listed building. Historic Environment Scotland describes it as a house of several periods, with an earlier tower and later Georgian and Victorian additions. Its surrounding designed landscape contains parkland, woodland walks and a walled garden and is assessed by Historic Environment Scotland as having high architectural, scenic and nature-conservation value.

The castle gardens contain mature trees, shrubs, bulbs and ornamental planting. They are opened to the public on advertised dates through Scotland's Gardens Scheme.

Other surviving features of the older village and estate include Ardoch Parish Church, the former Free Church tower and Ardoch Old Bridge. Little Ardoch, at the northern entrance to Braco, is a Category C listed early to mid nineteenth-century house. An interpretation area beside Ardoch Bridge, installed by Perth and Kinross Heritage Trust with the local community council in 2002-03, provides information about local historic buildings and the nearby Roman remains.

== Natural environment and wildlife ==
The countryside around Braco is predominantly agricultural, with river corridors, woodland, parkland and upland habitats. The Braco Castle designed landscape has high nature-conservation value, and Historic Environment Scotland records Braco Pinewood, immediately north-west of the castle, as a Scottish Wildlife Trust Listed Wildlife Site.

Braco Pinewood has been studied for its woodland structure, vegetation and lichen flora. A 1984 study concluded that the pinewood was probably planted in the eighteenth century rather than being a surviving ancient pinewood, but suggested that its similarities to native pinewoods may result from the use of native Scots pine stock followed by natural regeneration.

A NatureScot survey recorded a population of fewer than 50 mainly mature common juniper bushes within pine woodland on the Braco Castle estate, together with some young regeneration. In the upper Knaik catchment at Dunruchan, north-west of the village, NatureScot has also monitored restored upland blanket bog.

== Community and Education ==
Facilities in the village include a shop, coffee shop, motor repair garage, Ardoch Parish Church, Braco Primary School and Nursery, Braco Village Hall, a children's playpark, a multi-use games area and Braco Bowling Club. Lodge Park, at the northern end of the village, is the venue for the annual Braco Show.

Braco Village Hall is used for community activities and events and includes a main hall and stage, kitchen and audiovisual facilities. It is also used by the primary school during the school week. The 2023 community profile records local organisations including the Braco and Greenloaning Community Council, Ardoch Development Trust, Braco Village Hall Committee, Ardoch in Bloom and Ardoch Agricultural Society, as well as drama, music, craft and sporting groups.

Braco Primary School is a non-denominational primary school serving Braco, Greenloaning and the surrounding area. Perth and Kinross Council recorded a Primary 1 to Primary 7 roll of 54 pupils, with Crieff High School as the associated secondary school. Greenloaning Primary School closed permanently in 2019 and its catchment was incorporated into that of Braco Primary School.

Perth and Kinross Council is progressing proposals for a replacement Braco Primary School. In October 2025 the council reported that it had agreed an option to purchase a site, subject to planning consent, and had appointed a design team.

== Outdoor recreation ==
Perth and Kinross Council records 13 core paths, with a combined length of about 24 km, within the Braco and Greenloaning Community Council area. Routes around Braco follow parts of the River Knaik and connect the village with Greenloaning and the surrounding countryside.

The council's Braco North Circular starts in the village, passes the earthworks at Ardoch and follows the River Knaik north before returning through the countryside near Braco Castle.

== Culture and sport ==
The Braco Show is an annual agricultural show organised by the Ardoch Agricultural Society at Lodge Park. The society holds the show on the fourth Saturday in July, with classes including cattle, sheep, goats, horses and ponies.

Braco Village Hall hosts live music and other community events. Ardoch Development Trust has funded or supported music tuition, live music equipment and community music events, as well as the Braco Beer Festival. The Beer Festival is also listed amongst recurring local events in the Braco and Greenloaning Community Profile.

Braco Bowling Club was established in 1901. The club states that its ground was gifted by Dame Mary Renny Watson on behalf of her late husband, Sir William Renny Watson of Braco Castle, and that the bowling green commemorated Queen Victoria's Diamond Jubilee.

== Media coverage ==
Braco is served by four paid-for newspapers: the Strathearn Herald, the Perthshire Advertiser and the Stirling Observer. It is also covered by the Perthshire edition of the Courier, based in Dundee.

Because of its location it also receives local radio stations which cover both central Scotland and Perthshire, such as Central FM and Tay AM/FM.

== Transport ==
=== Public transport ===
Braco is served by Stagecoach East Scotland's 15A service, which links the village with Crieff, Perth, Greenloaning, Dunblane and Stirling. Docherty's Midland Coaches also operates the schoolday 615 service between Braco and Perth via Muthill, Crieff, Methven and St John's Academy.

Nearby Greenloaning is also a pre-booked stop on Ember's E3 electric intercity coach service between Dundee and Glasgow. From Greenloaning the service provides direct connections to Dundee, Perth, Auchterarder and Gleneagles, Dunblane, Stirling, Cumbernauld and Glasgow.

=== Railways ===
Braco does not have an operational railway station. Rail services are available from nearby Dunblane to the south and Gleneagles to the east. Both stations lie on the rail corridor between central Scotland and Perth, with services providing connections towards Glasgow, Edinburgh, Stirling, Perth and destinations further north.

Historically, the nearest railway station was at Greenloaning, approximately one mile south of Braco. It was built by the Scottish Central Railway as one of ten intermediate stations on the new Stirling-to-Perth line, which opened in 1848. The railway significantly improved access between the Braco area, Perth and central Scotland during the nineteenth century.

Greenloaning station originally employed a stationmaster, booking clerk, porters and a pointsman, with staffing subsequently increasing as traffic grew. The Scottish Central Railway amalgamated with the Caledonian Railway in 1865, connecting the route more extensively with the wider British railway network.

Greenloaning station closed to passengers in 1956, although the Stirling to Perth railway remains in operation. The former station and station master's house survive beside the line. Network Rail acquired the building in 2019 and subsequently proposed its demolition to allow development of the site for railway storage and maintenance purposes. A local campaign was mounted to preserve the building, including efforts to secure statutory protection.

The former station building and station master's house survived and on 20 April 2021, Historic Environment Scotland designated the former Greenloaning Station and Station Master's House as a Category C listed building. The designation describes it as a relatively little-altered example of a small station from the early period of Scottish railway expansion, retaining its original plan form and a number of internal features, including the former ticket desk, service hatch and early railway signage.

== Notable people ==
- William McGregor (1846-1911), football administrator and founder of The Football League, was born in Braco. McGregor's 1888 initiative led to the establishment of the Football League, the first organised association-football league.
- Robert Howden (1856-1940), anatomist and editor of editions of Gray's Anatomy, was born in Braco.
- Ronald Forbes (born 1947), painter and filmmaker, was born in Braco. He became a full member of the Royal Scottish Academy in 2005.
- Chris Sawyer (born 1961), computer game designer and programmer known for Transport Tycoon and RollerCoaster Tycoon, has been resident in Braco. A 1998 Copyright Tribunal notice recorded Sawyer at an address in the village.

== See also ==
- William Duff, 1st Earl Fife
- Ronald Forbes (artist)
- William McGregor
- Kate Nevin - Witch of Monzie
- Andrew Lawrenceson Smith
