= Pittenzie Halt railway station =

Former railway station in Scotland

Coordinates: 56.3660°N 3.8337°W

Pittenzie Halt

General information
- Location: Pittachar, near Crieff, Perth and Kinross; Scotland
- Platforms: 1

Other information
- Status: Disused

History
- Original company: Scottish Region of British Railways

Key dates
- 15 September 1958: Opened
- 6 July 1964: Closed
Location

Pittenzie Halt railway station on the Crieff Junction Railway served the small hamlet of Pittachar, near Crieff in Scotland. The line was built in 1856 for the Crieff Junction Railway, which connected Crieff with the Scottish Central Railway at Crieff Junction (now Gleneagles). The CJR was absorbed by the Caledonian Railway in 1865, which itself became part of the London, Midland and Scottish in 1923. The line and the station were closed as part of the Beeching closures in 1964.

== Sources ==
- Butt, R. V. J. (October 1995). The Directory of Railway Stations: details every public and private passenger station, halt, platform and stopping place, past and present (1st ed.). Sparkford: Patrick Stephens Ltd. ISBN 978-1-85260-508-7. OCLC 60251199. OL 11956311M.

Preceding station	Historical railways	Following station
Highlandman; Line and Station closed	Caledonian Railway; Crieff Junction Railway	Crieff; Line and Station closed
