= Crieff and Comrie Railway =

Scottish Railway

Overview
- Locale: Scotland
- Dates of operation: 1 June 1893–1 August 1898
- Successor: Caledonian Railway

Technical
- Track gauge: 4 ft 8 1/2 in (1,435 mm)

The Crieff and Comrie Railway was a Scottish railway, opened in 1893, connecting Comrie to the railway network at Crieff. The tourism potential of Loch Earn was an important factor, and the route was later extended westward to Lochearnhead. However the line was never successful, and declined in the twentieth century, particularly due to cheap and frequent bus competition. Four-wheel railbuses were introduced in 1958 to reduce operating costs, but the decline continued and the line closed on 6 July 1964.

== History ==
=== Background ===
Crieff was the second largest town in Perthshire, and when railways northwards from central Scotland were being planned, routes through Crieff were considered. However the topography was more challenging on that axis, and when the Scottish Central Railway was authorised, its route ran east of Crieff through Auchterarder.

The Scottish Central opened in 1848, connecting Perth to the Edinburgh and Glasgow Railway and the Caledonian Railway near Castlecary, giving connecting routes to Glasgow and Edinburgh.

Crieff could not remain without a railway connection, and in 1853 the Crieff Junction Railway was authorised. Engineered by Thomas Bouch it opened on 14 March 1856. It crossed the River Earn and ran southwards, joining the Scottish Central main line at Crieff Junction; that station was renamed Gleneagles in 1912. The Crieff Junction line was worked by the Scottish Central Railway.

In 1858 a line was opened connecting Perth with the town of Methven. The short line was called the Perth, Almond Valley and Methven Railway; it ran west from a junction with the Scottish Midland Junction Railway a short distance north of Perth station. A stagecoach formed a link between Methven and Crieff, until a railway link was made; this was the Crieff and Methven Junction Railway, opened on 21 May 1866. The two lines joined south-east of Crieff and shared a station on the south side of the town. However they each had their own engine shed.

By this time there had long been proposals to extend westwards, to Comrie and possibly much further west to Lochearnhead, and surveys had been carried out, but the schemes had come to nothing.

=== A viable scheme delayed ===
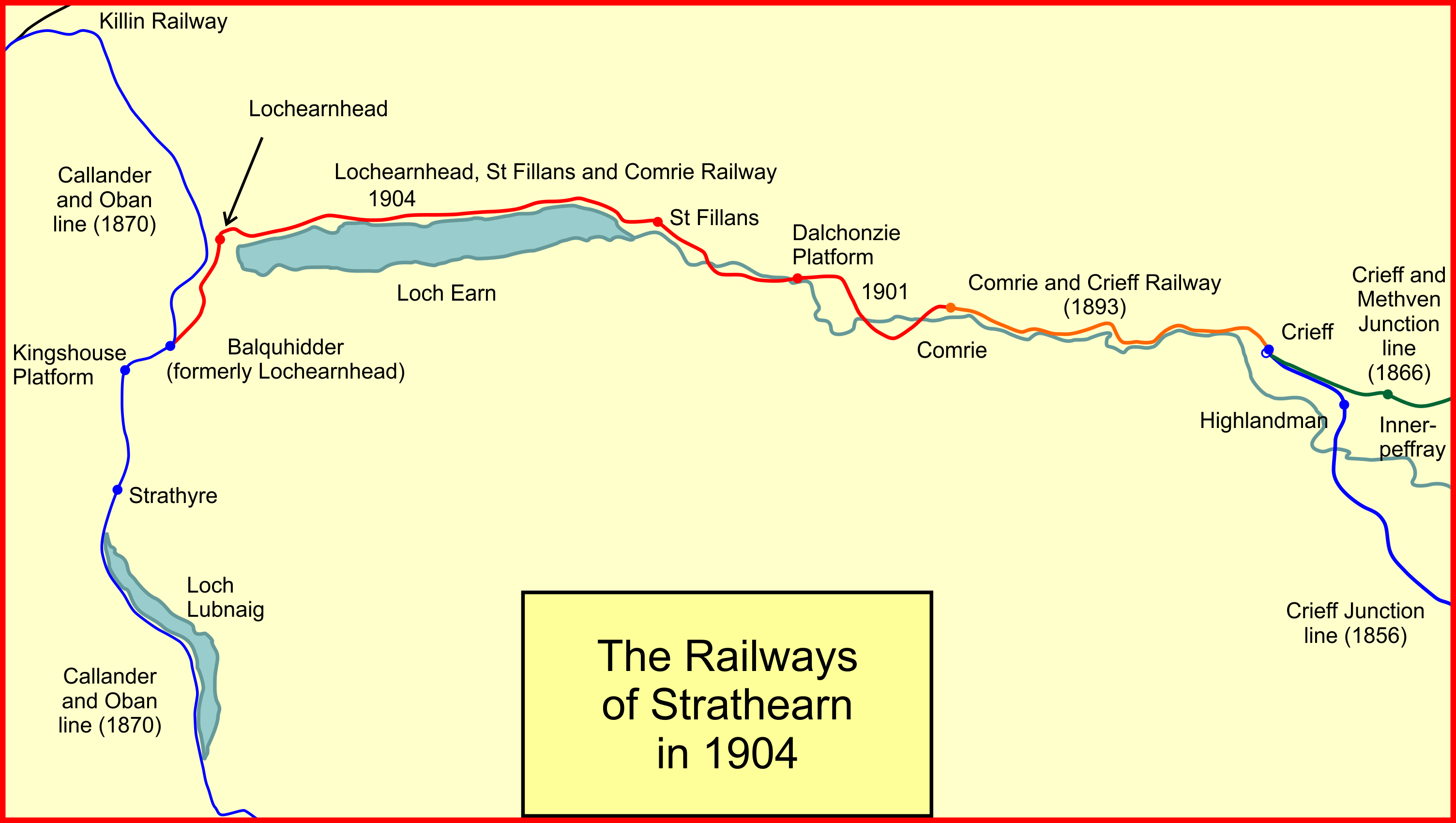
The railways of Strathearn in 1904

In 1863 Colonel Williamson, proprietor of the Lawers estate, became involved in promoting a railway from Comrie. He published a pamphlet proposing a railway connecting Comrie and Crieff, and within a month £22,000 had been subscribed locally for the line. As well as the ordinary commercial traffic that Comrie might generate, tourism was becoming an important source of income at this period.

Crieff and Comrie Railway Act 1865
- Act of Parliament
- Parliament of the United Kingdom
- Long title: An Act for making a Railway from the Town of Crieff to Comrie, with a Railway connecting said Railway with the authorized Crieff and Methven Junction Railway; and for other Purposes.
- Citation: 28 & 29 Vict. c. ccxciv

Dates
- Royal assent: 5 July 1865

Text of statute as originally enacted

The estimated cost of construction was £32,000 and it was considered that it would be easy to raise the entire sum. A bill was submitted to Parliament for the 1865 session, and the Crieff and Comrie Railway was authorised by the Crieff and Comrie Railway Act 1865 (28 & 29 Vict. c. ccxciv).

The existing station faced King Street and the Comrie line was to approach from the west. The Crieff and Methven company was still building its line, and it was announced that it would build a through station suitable for all three companies, the earlier Crieff Junction Railway station being reduced to goods station status.

The Scottish Central Railway had undertaken to make a substantial investment in the line, but on 1 August 1865 the Scottish Central amalgamated with the Caledonian Railway. The Caledonian was experiencing financial difficulties at a time when money generally was in short supply, and the Caledonian took a less optimistic view of the prospects of the Comrie line. It now transpired that many of the enthusiastic local subscriptions in the line were doubtful, and when the Caledonian declared its own reluctance, it was suddenly plain that the line would not be built.

Williamson did not give up the proposal, and in particular in 1880 he tried to get the scheme going again, but on this occasion he experienced opposition from landowners, and no progress was made.

=== Another attempt ===
In the latter decades of the 19th century, tourism and leisure travel became increasingly important. The terrain of Strathearn was considered to have considerable natural beauty, but the difficulty of transport to Comrie meant that there was a disadvantage compared to locations that were rail-connected, or on the coast and accessible by steamer.

In early 1888 a further group of interested people met and decided to try once again to get the line built. This time they intended to persuade the Caledonian Railway, as successor to the Scottish Central Railway, to build the line. The North British Railway (NBR), a deadly rival to the Caledonian, had by now made a line to Perth and it was possible that the NBR might be induced to support a line through Crieff and Comrie towards the West Highland coast. The threat of this penetration by the NBR might induce the Caledonian to comply with the committee's wish to get their railway; and if not, maybe the NBR would indeed build their own line.

The committee called on the Caledonian chairman, but they had not brought any prepared costs with them, nor any indication of likely local financial support, and they were received coldly. A letter was later sent to the Caledonian formalising the proposal, but this was rebuffed, with the Caledonian merely saying (in a letter of 7 March 1888) that they were prepared to work the line if it was built.

Crieff and Comrie Railway Act 1890
- Act of Parliament
- Parliament of the United Kingdom
- Long title: An Act for incorporating the Crieff and Comrie Railway Company and for authorising the construction of a Railway from Crieff to Comrie in the County of Perth and for other purposes.
- Citation: 53 & 54 Vict. c. cxxii

Dates
- Royal assent: 25 July 1890

Text of statute as originally enacted

The Crieff and Comrie Railway was authorised by the Crieff and Comrie Railway Act 1890 (53 & 54 Vict. c. cxxii) of 25 July 1890; the share capital was to be £45,000.

=== Construction ===
The line was to be six miles (9 km) long, with no intermediate stations; there was to be a 90-yard (82 m) tunnel, and a significant overbridge under Burrell Street (later made a short tunnel). The majority of the line followed the valley of the River Earn and terminated east of Comrie, in fact east of the Bridge of Lednock; the Caledonian Railway, as owners of the former Crieff Junction line, were to reconstruct Crieff station on a through line. Contracts for construction of the main line were let in the sum of £30,188 and completion was anticipated for July 1892.

Although arrears on calls on the shares were said to be minimal, the take up of the authorised share issue was incomplete, and the company soon found itself short of cash and appealed to the Caledonian Railway for financial help, which was swiftly refused. The request was repeated in June 1892 with the same result. Subsequent appeals to the public to subscribe were not much taken up, and a large loan was incurred, much of it personally guaranteed by the directors of the company.

A trial run over the line was carried out just before 17 May 1893, and the line was formally inspected by Major-General Hutchinson of the Board of Trade on 29 May 1893. The inspection was successful and the opening of the line took place with much ceremony on 1 June 1893. There were six passenger trains each way daily, with some running through to Perth.

=== Financial difficulties ===
It emerged in early 1894 that the company's finances were in a far worse state than the shareholders had understood. At a difficult shareholders' meeting the directors declined to publish some financial information, and it was urged that external directors, from outside the area and not part of any local group, should be appointed. This was refused and voted down. The company was making a small operating profit: revenue for the half year to July 1894 had been £1,197, about half of which came from passenger traffic. £591 was due to the Caledonian for working the line, and the surplus after other charges was £413. Meanwhile, the contractor Mackay had an outstanding claim for £11,150, so far not declared in the accounts.

Shareholders' meetings heard that a small surplus existed and that a dividend of 1.5% could be paid. The capital position of the company was desperate, but often there were calls to extend the line westward, to Lochearnhead. Yet the capital cost of providing even a simple goods siding that was requested would have wiped out the surplus.

=== Caledonian rescue ===
At this time the Caledonian Railway wished to extend to Lochearnhead to join the former Callander and Oban Railway line. Moreover, it was concerned that the rival North British Railway would build such a line, abstracting much of its traffic in the area. When the Comrie company opened discussions with the Caledonian about selling their line, they found that the Caledonian was willing. In fact its offer was remarkably generous: they would repay the share capital in full, pay off the mortgage loan, and settle MacKay's claim. This was put to a special shareholders' meeting on 9 February 1898. The shareholders agreed and the company was vested in the Caledonian Railway by the Caledonian Railway Act 1898 (61 & 62 Vict. c. clxxxviii) of 1 August 1898.

=== Extending westward ===
The Comrie line was simply an extension from Crieff to Comrie, but the attraction of closing the gap to Lochearnhead, there joining the former Callander and Oban Railway line, was irresistible, and the Lochearnhead, St Fillans and Comrie Railway opened in 1901. Optimistic assertions that transatlantic trade would arrive at Oban and be transported to the east of Scotland over the line proved unsubstantiated. Although the hoped for tourist trade developed somewhat, changing social patterns limited the extent to which either of the Comrie lines benefitted. Moreover, the connectional arrangements at Lochearnhead were never made convenient.

=== Decline ===
After World War I road bus services took an increasing share of passenger traffic, and after World War II the process accelerated considerably; the bus companies were running more frequently and at considerably lower fares. This resulted in the St Fillans line closing in 1951, together with the Methven line. The passenger service at Comrie reduced to one train each way daily.

In an attempt to sustain the passenger service, British Railways introduced four-wheel railbuses made by AC Cars which started on the line in September 1958, with three trains daily running between Crieff and Comrie. Various other types were tried later but proved unreliably mechanically with a number of services provided by a standby steam locomotive and a couple of coaches.

The change did little to revive the line, and following the so-called Beeching Report of 1963 (The Reshaping of British Railways) the line was listed for closure. The last train ran on 4 July 1964.

== Connections to other lines ==
- Lochearnhead, St Fillans and Comrie Railway at Comrie
- Crieff and Methven Junction Railway at Crieff
- Crieff Junction Railway at Crieff

== Sources ==
- Awdry, Christopher (1990). Encyclopaedia of British Railway Companies. Sparkford: Patrick Stephens Ltd. ISBN 1-8526-0049-7. OCLC 19514063. CN 8983.
- Jowett, Alan (March 1989). Jowett's Railway Atlas of Great Britain and Ireland: From Pre-Grouping to the Present Day (1st ed.). Sparkford: Patrick Stephens Ltd. ISBN 978-1-85260-086-0. OCLC 22311137.
