= Muthill railway station =

Former railway station in England

Coordinates: 56.3291°N 3.7900°W

Muthill

General information
- Location: Muthill, Perth and Kinross; Scotland
- Platforms: 2

Other information
- Status: Disused

History
- Original company: Crieff Junction Railway
- Pre-grouping: Caledonian Railway

Key dates
- 13 March 1856: Opened
- 6 July 1964: Closed
Location

Muthill railway station served the village of Muthill in Scotland. The station is now the premises of James Haggart & Sons LTD (A potato grower and exporter,) the site also has around 7 houses on it.

== History ==
The station was built in 1856 for the Crieff Junction Railway, which connected the town of Crieff, four miles to the north, with the Scottish Central Railway at Crieff Junction (now Gleneagles). The CJR was absorbed by the Caledonian Railway in 1865, which itself became part of the London, Midland and Scottish in 1923. The line and the station were closed as part of the Beeching closures in 1964.

| Preceding station | Historical railways | Following station |
|---|---|---|
| Tullibardine; Line and Station closed | Caledonian Railway; Crieff Junction Railway | Strageath Halt; Line and Station closed |
