= Strageath Halt railway station =

Short-lived railway station in Muthill, Perth and Kinross

Strageath Halt

General information
- Location: Muthill, Perthshire; Scotland
- Platforms: 1

Other information
- Status: Disused

History
- Original company: British Railways (Scottish Region)

Key dates
- 15 September 1958: Opened
- 6 July 1964: Closed
Location

Strageath Halt railway station served the village of Muthill, in the historic county of Perthshire, Scotland, from 1958 to 1964 on the Crieff Junction Railway.

== History ==
The station was opened on 15 September 1958 by the Scottish Region of British Railways. It was a request stop. It was a short-lived station, only being open for under 6 years before closing on 6 July 1964.

Preceding station	Disused railways	Following station
Highlandman; Line and station closed	Scottish Region of British Railways; Crieff Junction Railway	Muthill; Line and station closed
