= Tullibardine railway station =

Former railway station in Scotland

Coordinates: 56.3024°N 3.7503°W

Tullibardine

General information
- Location: Tullibardine, Perth and Kinross; Scotland
- Platforms: 1

Other information
- Status: Disused

History
- Original company: Crieff Junction Railway
- Pre-grouping: Caledonian Railway

Key dates
- 1857: Opened
- 6 July 1964: Closed
Location

Tullibardine railway station served the town of Tullibardine, Perth and Kinross in Scotland.

== History ==
It was built in 1857 for the Crieff Junction Railway, which connected the town of Crieff, six miles to the north, with the Scottish Central Railway at Crieff Junction (now Gleneagles). The CJR was absorbed by the Caledonian Railway in 1865, which itself became part of the London, Midland and Scottish in 1923. The line and the station were closed as part of the Beeching closures in 1964.

| Preceding station | Historical railways | Following station |
|---|---|---|
| Gleneagles; Line closed; Station open | Caledonian Railway; Crieff Junction Railway | Muthill; Line and Station closed |
