= Tullibardine =

Village in Perth and Kinross, Scotland

Tullibardine is a location in Perth and Kinross, Scotland, which gives its name to a village, a castle and a grant of nobility.

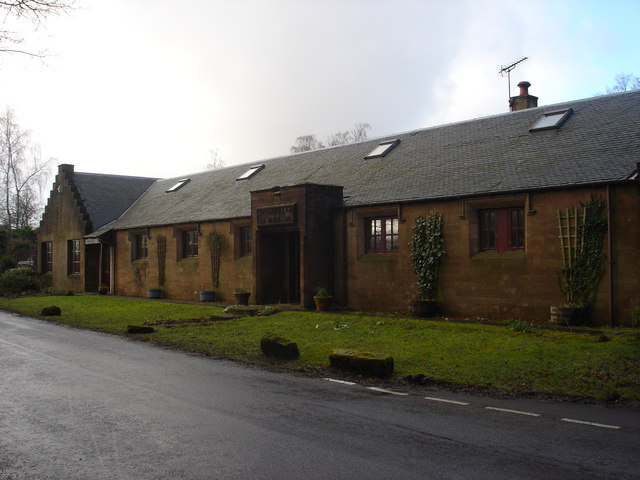
Village hall, Tullibardine

The village of Tullibardine is a settlement of approximately forty dwellings about 10 miles (16 kilometres) southwest of Perth. It lies in the parish of Blackford, and the nearest town is Auchterarder, 1 1/2 miles (2.5 kilometres) to the south.

Tullibardine Castle was a medieval fortification on a low eminence west of the village. Little is known about it and it no longer exists. The castle was built by the Clan Murray in the late 13th to early 14th century, after it had extended its holdings south from its heartland in Morayshire. The castle predates the nearby chapel, which is dated to 1446. The castle was dismantled in 1747, following the Jacobite rebellion, and was completely demolished in 1833.

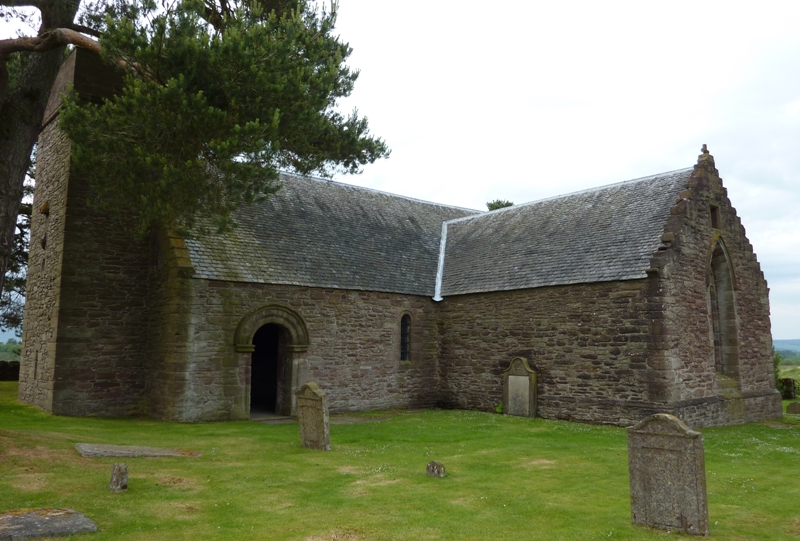
Tullibardine Chapel

Tullibardine Chapel was built in the 1446 by David Murray of Tullibardine as a family chapel and burial site, and members of the Murray family were buried there until 1900. The chapel has remained unaltered since the 16th century.

Regent Morton came to Tullibardine in September 1575, as the guest of Sir William Murray, Comptroller of Scotland. Sir John Murray was a favoured courtier of James VI of Scotland, who came to the wedding of Murray's daughter Lilias and John Grant of Freuchie at Tullibardine on 21 June 1591. Murray was promoted to Earl of Tullibardine in the peerage of Scotland in 1606, and to a marquessate in 1696. A branch of the family became the Earls of Atholl, then Dukes of Atholl, and the title "Marquess of Tullibardine" remains the title of the Atholl heir. The most notable Lords of Tullibardine were William Murray, a leading figure of the 1715 and 1719 Jacobite rebellions, and his brother George, a leader in 1745.

In modern times, Tullibardine was served by a station on the Crieff Junction Railway, later part of the Caledonian and then the London, Midland and Scottish railways. The station, which opened in 1856, was closed in 1964.

The name is now used by the Tullibardine distillery in Blackford, which opened in 1949, and to several of their brands of whisky.
