= Arabella Rankin =

Scottish painter (1871–1943)

- Born: 1871; Muthill, Perthshire, Scotland
- Died: 1943 (aged 71–72); Kensington, London, England

Arabella Louisa Rankin (1871 – 1943) was a Scottish painter and colour woodcut artist.

== Biography ==
Rankin was born at Muthill in Perthshire.

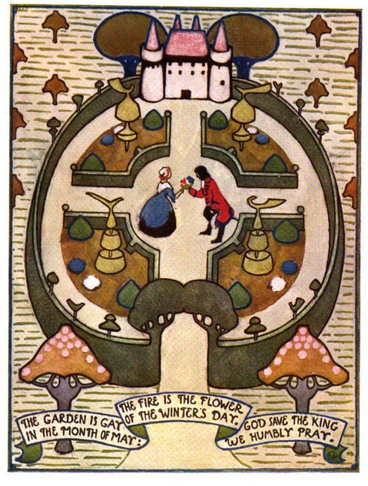
Arabella Rankin, "Sir Espérance" (1902); the text of the illustration reads "The garden is gay in the month of May/The fire is the flower of the winter's day/God save the King we humbly pray."

Rankin contributed a story, "Kaitrin's Collection", to the 1893 Summer Number of the Dundee Weekly News. In 1896, Rankin also won first prize in a contest for artful embroidered book covers, run by Studio International magazine, with her Podley. She also won first prize in a contest run by the same magazine in 1902, for a colour illustration titled Sir Espérance. In 1899, her watercolour titled "A Swimming Match" was exhibited at the Royal Scottish Academy in Edinburgh.

Beyond these very early efforts, Rankin worked primarily with colour woodcuts. Early examples of her prints, such as The Striped Rocks (1920) or Sligneach, Iona (1921), show her using Japanese wood block techniques. Later landscape works, such as Martyr's Bay, Iona and Iona, from 1924 and 1927 respectively, use a more conventional approach.

After a spell in Edinburgh, Rankin worked in London for a time. She returned to Scotland in 1913 and lived at Abbotsbrae in Crieff before returning to London in 1922. She lived in Kensington for the rest of her life. Rankin was a member of the Colour Woodcut Society and from 1924 to 1935 exhibited regularly with the Society of Graver Painters in Colour. During her career she had some twenty-four pieces shown at the Royal Scottish Academy and also exhibited with the Society of Women Artists, and the Royal Glasgow Institute of the Fine Arts.

Both the Victoria and Albert Museum and the British Museum hold examples of her prints.
