= Jane Hyslop =

Jane Hyslop may refer to:

- Jane Richmond Hyslop (born 1967), Canadian singer known professionally as Jane Child
- Jane Hyslop (artist) (born 1966), Scottish artist
