= List of listed buildings in Crieff, Perth and Kinross =

This is a list of listed buildings in the parish of Crieff in Perth and Kinross, Scotland.

== List ==
Name	Location	Date Listed	Grid Ref. (Note: Sometimes known as OSGB36, the grid reference (where provided) is based on the British national grid reference system used by the Ordnance Survey. • "Guide to National Grid". Ordnance Survey. • "Get-a-map". Ordnance Survey.)	Geo-coordinates	Notes	LB Number (Note: Historic Environment Scotland assign a unique alphanumeric identifier to each designated site in Scotland, for listed buildings this always begins with "LB", for example "LB12345".)	Image
85 And 87 East High Street (Known As 81), Tower Hotel Including Boundary Walls				56°22′23″N 3°50′04″W	Category B	23486	Upload Photo
1-5 (Odd Nos) Hill Street And High Street				56°22′23″N 3°50′25″W	Category B	23491	Upload Photo
1-7 (Inclusive Nos) Burrell Square Including Railings				56°22′26″N 3°50′43″W	Category C(S)	23502	Upload Photo
Innerpeffray Library				56°20′41″N 3°46′42″W	Category A	5792	Upload another image
Monzie Parish Church, Gatepiers To Churchyard				56°24′14″N 3°49′06″W	Category B	5774	Upload Photo
Monzie Bridge Over Shaggie Burn				56°24′16″N 3°49′09″W	Category C(S)	5777	Upload Photo
Broich House				56°21′43″N 3°50′34″W	Category B	5788	Upload Photo
13 And 15 Commissioner Street				56°22′15″N 3°50′28″W	Category C(S)	48439	Upload Photo
Comrie Road, Dalvreck Bridge Over The Turret Burn				56°23′01″N 3°51′10″W	Category C(S)	48444	Upload Photo
Comrie Road And Gordon Road, Hawkshaw And Merlin Cottage Including Terrace Walls, Cart Arch And Boundary Walls				56°22′35″N 3°50′39″W	Category B	48447	Upload Photo
Comrie Road, Leven House Hotel Including Boundary Walls				56°22′29″N 3°50′37″W	Category B	48448	Upload Photo
Ferntower Road, Knowehead House Including Terraced Garden With Sundial, Boundary Walls, Gatepiers And Gates				56°22′44″N 3°49′57″W	Category B	48465	Upload Photo
Ferntower Road, Morrison's Academy Gatepiers, Gates And Boundary Walls				56°22′26″N 3°50′24″W	Category B	48467	Upload Photo
James Square, Jubilee Lamps				56°22′23″N 3°50′28″W	Category B	48488	Upload Photo
Macrosty Park (formally Crieff Country Park) Boundary Walls, Gatepiers, Railings And Gates				56°22′45″N 3°50′54″W	Category C(S)	48495	Upload Photo
Perth Road, St Columba's Scottish Episcopal Church War Memorial, Gatepiers, Gates And Boundary Walls				56°22′29″N 3°49′59″W	Category C(S)	48498	Upload Photo
49-57 (Odd Nos) King Street And 51-59 (Odd Nos) Commissioner Street				56°22′19″N 3°50′34″W	Category B	23497	Upload Photo
Ferntower Road, St Andrews Halls Including Boundary Walls, Gatepiers And Gates				56°22′32″N 3°50′14″W	Category B	23514	Upload Photo
Perth Road, Ferntower Lodge Including Gatepiers And Boundary Walls				56°22′47″N 3°49′38″W	Category B	23516	Upload Photo
1 And 2 Dallerie Road, The Limes				56°22′19″N 3°51′07″W	Category B	23521	Upload Photo
Innerpeffray Churchyard				56°20′41″N 3°46′40″W	Category B	5745	Upload Photo
Monzie Parish Church				56°24′15″N 3°49′05″W	Category B	5773	Upload Photo
C. S. Todd Monzie Manse (No Longer Used As Such And Known As 'The Old Manse':				56°24′14″N 3°49′09″W	Category B	5778	Upload Photo
Innerpeffray Collegiate Church Of The Blessed Virgin				56°20′41″N 3°46′41″W	Category A	5791	Upload another image
Broich Road, Duchlage				56°22′04″N 3°50′33″W	Category B	48425	Upload Photo
42-46 (Even Nos) Burrell Street				56°22′18″N 3°50′45″W	Category C(S)	48435	Upload Photo
66 Burrell Street				56°22′13″N 3°50′48″W	Category C(S)	48436	Upload Photo
Comrie Road, Glengyle Including Boundary Walls, Gatepiers And Gates				56°22′39″N 3°50′47″W	Category C(S)	48445	Upload Photo
Comrie Road, Gwydyr House Hotel Including Boundary Walls And Gatepiers				56°22′42″N 3°50′43″W	Category C(S)	48446	Upload Photo
Ferntower Road, Larchgrove Including Boundary Walls And Gates				56°22′39″N 3°50′06″W	Category B	48466	Upload Photo
7 - 15 A And B (Odd Nos) Galvelmore Street				56°22′22″N 3°50′38″W	Category C(S)	48473	Upload Photo
7 High Street				56°22′22″N 3°50′26″W	Category C(S)	48475	Upload Photo
35 James Square, Strathearn Tower				56°22′23″N 3°50′31″W	Category C(S)	48485	Upload Photo
Perth Road And Rectory Road, The Old Rectory And Rectory Cottage Including Boundary Walls, Gatepiers And Gates				56°22′31″N 3°49′59″W	Category B	48497	Upload Photo
West High Street, Clydesdale Bank With 28-30 (Even Nos), And 2 Galvelmore Street				56°22′24″N 3°50′34″W	Category B	48503	Upload Photo
Church Street, Crieff Community Hall, Former St Michael's Parish Church				56°22′20″N 3°50′17″W	Category B	23481	Upload Photo
Lodge Street, Masonic Lodge With 2 And 4 Comrie Street And Library				56°22′26″N 3°50′36″W	Category B	23500	Upload Photo
8 And 9 Burrell Square				56°22′26″N 3°50′43″W	Category C(S)	23503	Upload Photo
12 A, B, C & D Burrell Street				56°22′27″N 3°50′40″W	Category C(S)	23505	Upload Photo
Drummond Terrace, Roundelwood Health Spa Including Boundary Walls With Gatepiers				56°22′50″N 3°50′47″W	Category B	23511	Upload another image
Strathearn Terrace, St Michael's Church Of Scotland Parish Church Including Boundary Walls, Gatepiers, Gates And Lamps				56°22′32″N 3°50′10″W	Category B	23513	Upload Photo
147 And 151 King Street, 84 And 86 Burrell Street, 1 And 3 Gallowhill				56°22′10″N 3°50′48″W	Category C(S)	23520	Upload Photo
Innerpeffray Castle				56°20′26″N 3°46′24″W	Category B	5746	Upload another image
Monzie Churchyard				56°24′14″N 3°49′06″W	Category C(S)	5775	Upload Photo
'Old Roman Bridge' Over Shaggie Burn, Monzie				56°24′16″N 3°49′08″W	Category C(S)	5776	Upload Photo
Monzie Castle, Mid-Lodge Over Keltie Burn				56°23′51″N 3°50′16″W	Category B	5784	Upload Photo
Innerpeffray School				56°20′41″N 3°46′37″W	Category C(S)	5790	Upload Photo
Broich Terrace, Gowrie House Including Boundary Walls And Gatepiers				56°22′12″N 3°50′17″W	Category B	48426	Upload Photo
2 Coldwells Road, Dalknock				56°22′27″N 3°50′34″W	Category C(S)	48437	Upload Photo
Connaught Terrace, Tighmonadh Including Gatepiers And Boundary Walls				56°22′43″N 3°49′50″W	Category C(S)	48454	Upload Photo
77 - 83 (Odd Nos) East High Street				56°22′23″N 3°50′05″W	Category B	48460	Upload Photo
74 East High Street				56°22′23″N 3°50′07″W	Category C(S)	48461	Upload Photo
High Street, Post Office				56°22′21″N 3°50′20″W	Category B	48479	Upload Photo
High Street, Provost's Lamp				56°22′22″N 3°50′18″W	Category C(S)	48480	Upload Photo
King Street, Police Station Including Boundary Walls, Gatepiers, Gates And Railings				56°22′21″N 3°50′32″W	Category B	48493	Upload Photo
Perth Road, Keppoch House Hotel Including Boundary Walls, Gatepiers And Railings				56°22′38″N 3°49′54″W	Category C(S)	48496	Upload Photo
32 West High Street, Strathearn Gallery				56°22′24″N 3°50′35″W	Category C(S)	48504	Upload Photo
14 And 15 Burrell Square				56°22′25″N 3°50′41″W	Category C(S)	23504	Upload Photo
Ferntower Road, Morrison's Academy, Old School Building				56°22′30″N 3°50′26″W	Category B	23510	Upload Photo
Ewanfield, Crieff Hydro Hotel Including Gatepiers And Boundary Walls				56°22′47″N 3°50′16″W	Category B	23512	Upload another image
Faichney Monument, Innerpeffray Churchyard				56°20′41″N 3°46′41″W	Category B	5793	Upload Photo
Monzie Castle, West Lodge				56°23′48″N 3°50′38″W	Category B	5785	Upload Photo
Inchbrakie Bower, Abercairny				56°22′37″N 3°46′56″W	Category B	5789	Upload Photo
Broich Terrace, And Pittenzie Road, Old St Michael's And Manse Cottage Including Boundary Walls, Gatepiers And Gates				56°22′12″N 3°50′11″W	Category B	48428	Upload Photo
Coldwells Road, Bute Cottage				56°22′28″N 3°50′31″W	Category C(S)	48438	Upload Photo
Comrie Road, War Memorial With Boundary Walls, Railings And Gate				56°22′29″N 3°50′39″W	Category B	48453	Upload Photo
Ewanfield, Crieff Hydro Hotel, Leigh Annex				56°22′47″N 3°50′22″W	Category B	48464	Upload Photo
Ferntower Road, Morrison's Academy Lodge				56°22′26″N 3°50′24″W	Category B	48468	Upload Photo
Ford Road, St Fillans Catholic Church And Presbytery				56°22′07″N 3°51′00″W	Category B	48471	Upload Photo
9 And 11 High Street				56°22′22″N 3°50′26″W	Category C(S)	48476	Upload Photo
19, 19A And 19B High Street				56°22′22″N 3°50′24″W	Category C(S)	48478	Upload Photo
King Street, Kingdom Hall Of Jehovah's Witnesses				56°22′20″N 3°50′30″W	Category C(S)	48491	Upload Photo
10 Strathearn Terrace, Croftweit Including Boundary Walls, Gatepiers And Gates				56°22′26″N 3°50′10″W	Category B	48499	Upload Photo
89 And 91 East High Street				56°22′24″N 3°50′03″W	Category B	23487	Upload Photo
High Street, The Bank Restaurant, Former British Linen Bank				56°22′22″N 3°50′22″W	Category A	23489	Upload another image See more images
115 King Street				56°22′13″N 3°50′44″W	Category B	23499	Upload Photo
Perth Road, Old Schoolhouse And Royal British Legion Hall, Former Taylor's Institute Including Gatepiers, Boundary Walls, Railings And Gate				56°22′28″N 3°50′00″W	Category B	23518	Upload Photo
Monzie Castle, Icehouse				56°23′54″N 3°49′42″W	Category C(S)	5781	Upload Photo
Monzie Castle, Bridge On East Drive Over Shaggie Burn				56°23′59″N 3°49′21″W	Category C(S)	5782	Upload Photo
Craigentor, Gilmerton				56°23′36″N 3°48′23″W	Category B	5787	Upload Photo
Ancaster Road, Newstead Including Boundary Walls And Gatepiers				56°22′46″N 3°50′38″W	Category C(S)	48423	Upload Photo
Ardvreck School Including Sanatorium				56°23′00″N 3°50′47″W	Category B	48424	Upload Photo
34 Burrell Street				56°22′22″N 3°50′43″W	Category C(S)	48432	Upload Photo
40 Burrell Street				56°22′19″N 3°50′44″W	Category B	48434	Upload Photo
44 Commissioner Street				56°22′16″N 3°50′32″W	Category B	48441	Upload Photo
62-68 (Even Nos) Commissioner Street And 72 King Street, Commercial Place				56°22′18″N 3°50′34″W	Category C(S)	48442	Upload Photo
Commissioner Street, Crieff Primary School Dining Hall, Former United Presbyterian Church, Including Boundary Walls And Railings				56°22′13″N 3°50′25″W	Category C(S)	48443	Upload another image See more images
32 Drummond Terrace, St Oswald's Including Boundary Walls, Gatepiers And Gates				56°22′43″N 3°50′36″W	Category C(S)	48458	Upload Photo
Ewanfield, Crieff Hydro Hotel, East Lodge House Including Boundary Walls				56°22′46″N 3°50′05″W	Category C(S)	48463	Upload Photo
Ferntower Road, Morrison's Academy Music Department				56°22′32″N 3°50′24″W	Category C(S)	48469	Upload Photo
High Street, The Pretoria				56°22′22″N 3°50′17″W	Category C(S)	48481	Upload Photo
36 James Square				56°22′23″N 3°50′31″W	Category C(S)	48486	Upload Photo
60 And 62 King Street And 45 And 47 Commissioner Street				56°22′18″N 3°50′33″W	Category B	48490	Upload Photo
Victoria Terrace, Benheath Including Boundary Walls, Gatepiers And Gates				56°22′37″N 3°50′32″W	Category C(S)	48501	Upload Photo
Broich Terrace, Inchglas Including Boundary Walls And Gatepiers				56°22′13″N 3°50′19″W	Category A	23488	Upload Photo
14 Burrell Street				56°22′24″N 3°50′41″W	Category C(S)	23506	Upload Photo
62 And 64 Burrell Street				56°22′14″N 3°50′48″W	Category B	23507	Upload Photo
Comrie Street, Old South Church, Antique Galleries Including Mission Hall, Boundary Walls, Railings, Gatepiers And Gates				56°22′29″N 3°50′36″W	Category A	23509	Upload another image See more images
South Bridgend, Mill House Including Boundary Walls And Gate				56°21′54″N 3°51′06″W	Category B	23524	Upload Photo
Monzie Castle, Walled Garden				56°23′55″N 3°49′40″W	Category C(S)	5780	Upload Photo
Dalvreck Bridge Over Turret Burn				56°23′01″N 3°51′10″W	Category C(S)	5786	Upload Photo
41 Burrell Street Including Boundary Walls				56°22′20″N 3°50′46″W	Category C(S)	48429	Upload Photo
43 Burrell Street Including Boundary Walls				56°22′20″N 3°50′46″W	Category C(S)	48430	Upload Photo
45 Burrell Street, Sauchie Cottage Including Boundary Walls And Railings				56°22′19″N 3°50′46″W	Category B	48431	Upload Photo
42 Commissioner Street With Lamp Standard				56°22′16″N 3°50′31″W	Category B	48440	Upload Photo
39 Drummond Terrace, Tom-An-Oir Including Boundary Walls And Gatepiers				56°22′48″N 3°50′39″W	Category C(S)	48456	Upload Photo
41 Drummond Terrace, Castellar Including Boundary Walls And Gatepiers				56°22′50″N 3°50′42″W	Category C(S)	48457	Upload Photo
Earnbank Road, Earnbank House Including Ancillary Building, Boundary Walls, Gatepiers And Gates				56°22′06″N 3°51′03″W	Category C(S)	48459	Upload Photo
1 Galvelmore Street, Bank Of Scotland Including Boundary Walls				56°22′24″N 3°50′36″W	Category B	48472	Upload Photo
Galvelmore Street, Galvelmore House Including Boundary Walls				56°22′23″N 3°50′37″W	Category C(S)	48474	Upload Photo
13, 15 And 17 High Street				56°22′22″N 3°50′25″W	Category C(S)	48477	Upload Photo
29-31 (Inclusive Nos) James Square, The Golf Company				56°22′21″N 3°50′28″W	Category C(S)	48483	Upload Photo
James Square, North Bank Buildings				56°22′22″N 3°50′30″W	Category B	48484	Upload another image
37 - 39 (Inclusive Nos) James Square				56°22′23″N 3°50′30″W	Category C(S)	48487	Upload Photo
King Street, Market Park				56°22′09″N 3°50′42″W	Category C(S)	48492	Upload Photo
Macrosty Park, Bandstand				56°22′45″N 3°51′02″W	Category B	48494	Upload Photo
Turretbank Road, West March Including Priest's Walk				56°22′37″N 3°51′05″W	Category C(S)	48500	Upload Photo
Church Street, St Michael's Churchyard Including Boundary Walls And Gatepiers				56°22′20″N 3°50′18″W	Category C(S)	23482	Upload Photo
Church Street, Ruberslaw House Including Boundary Walls And Railings				56°22′18″N 3°50′18″W	Category B	23483	Upload Photo
High Street, Tourist Information Centre, Former Town Hall, Cross Of Burgh Of Regality Of Drummond				56°22′22″N 3°50′23″W	Category B	23485	Upload another image
15 And 17 James Square, Royal Bank Of Scotland And Drummond Arms Hotel				56°22′24″N 3°50′27″W	Category B	23492	Upload Photo
9 - 13 (Inclusive Nos) James Square, Ancaster Studios				56°22′24″N 3°50′28″W	Category C(S)	23494	Upload Photo
Burrell Square, Stone Lamp Standard And Holder				56°22′26″N 3°50′41″W	Category B	23501	Upload Photo
Monzie Castle				56°23′57″N 3°49′35″W	Category A	5779	Upload another image
Monzie Castle, East Lodge				56°23′45″N 3°48′35″W	Category B	5783	Upload another image
76 East High Street				56°22′24″N 3°50′07″W	Category C(S)	48462	Upload Photo
Ford Road, Cemetery Including Triumphal Arches, Boundary Walls, Gatepiers, Gates And Fountain				56°22′12″N 3°51′01″W	Category C(S)	48470	Upload Photo
James Square, Murray Fountain				56°22′23″N 3°50′28″W	Category B	48489	Upload Photo
26 West High Street				56°22′24″N 3°50′34″W	Category C(S)	48502	Upload Photo
High Street, Tourist Information Centre, Former Town Hall				56°22′21″N 3°50′22″W	Category B	23484	Upload Photo
7 And 8 James Square, Waverley Hotel				56°22′24″N 3°50′29″W	Category C(S)	23495	Upload Photo
4, 5 And 6 James Square, Glenburn Hotel				56°22′24″N 3°50′29″W	Category C(S)	23496	Upload Photo
Bridge Of Turret				56°22′39″N 3°51′06″W	Category C(S)	23519	Upload Photo
Crieff Bridge Over River Earn				56°22′00″N 3°51′08″W	Category B	23522	Upload Photo
36 Burrell Street, Meadow Inn				56°22′21″N 3°50′43″W	Category C(S)	48433	Upload Photo
Dollerie Terrace, Walton Lodge Including Boundary Walls, Gate And Railings				56°22′26″N 3°49′54″W	Category C(S)	48455	Upload Photo

== Key ==
The scheme for classifying buildings in Scotland is:

- Category A: "buildings of national or international importance, either architectural or historic; or fine, little-altered examples of some particular period, style or building type."
- Category B: "buildings of regional or more than local importance; or major examples of some particular period, style or building type, which may have been altered."
- Category C: "buildings of local importance; lesser examples of any period, style, or building type, as originally constructed or moderately altered; and simple traditional buildings which group well with other listed buildings."

In March 2016 there were 47,288 listed buildings in Scotland. Of these, 8% were Category A, and 50% were Category B, with the remaining 42% being Category C.
