= Crieff railway station =

Railway station in Perth and Kinross, Scotland

Crieff
- The station around 1948

General information
- Location: Crieff, Perth and Kinross; Scotland
- Coordinates: 56.3703°N 3.8427°W
- Platforms: 2

Other information
- Status: Disused

History
- Original company: Crieff Junction Railway
- Pre-grouping: Caledonian Railway
- Post-grouping: London, Midland and Scottish Railway

Key dates
- 13 March 1856: Opened
- 1 June 1893: resited
- 6 July 1964: Closed
Location

Crieff was a junction railway station at Crieff, Perth and Kinross, Scotland. It was where the Crieff Junction Railway, Crieff and Methven Junction Railway and the Lochearnhead, St Fillans and Comrie Railway met.

The first terminus in Crieff was opened in 1856 as the terminus of the line from Crieff Junction, later rebuilt as Gleneagles Station. In 1866 the construction of a further line out to Methven meant that there was now a connection all the way to Perth. On 1 June 1893 this station closed when a replacement station was built immediately to the north of it, the old station being repurposed as the goods yard for the new station.

The new station was a large station built to the specifications of the Caledonian Railway with two platforms and three tracks which ran through the station with the central track being a goods line. It had a signal box at either end, the western one controlling the route to Comrie and the larger, eastern box controlling access to the goods yard, the locomotive sheds and the tracks to Gleneagles and Perth. Passenger services to Perth and beyond Comrie to Balquidder ceased in 1951 but the station remained open to goods and for the stub to Comrie plus the Gleneagles line.

The station closed to passengers on 6 July 1964 with the closure of the lines to Comrie and Gleneagles. Freight continued on the Almond Valley line until September 1967 and the first Crieff Station continued to be used as a goods yard until then.

The site of the station is now occupied by the Crieff Community Hospital while the former goods yard now houses the Crieff Medical Centre. Immediately west of the station site was a shallow cutting which was filled in during the 1980s to create a large car park and an adjacent supermarket.

Preceding station	Disused railways	Following station
Pittenzie Halt; Line and Station closed	Caledonian Railway; Crieff Junction Railway	Terminus
Innerpeffray; Line and Station closed	Caledonian Railway; Crieff and Methven Junction Railway	Terminus
Terminus	Caledonian Railway; Crieff and Comrie Railway	Comrie; Line and Station closed
