= 32–34 High Street, Crieff =

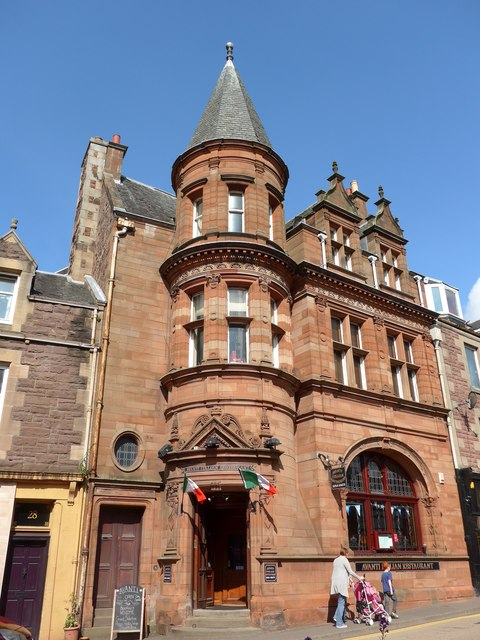
- The building in 2014

- Shown in Perth and Kinross
- 56.372833°N 3.839405°W
- Location: 32–34 High Street, Crieff, Perth and Kinross, Scotland

History
- Built: 1900 (126 years ago)

Site notes
- Architect: George Washington Browne

Listed Building – Category A
- Designated: 5 October 1971
- Reference no.: LB23489

32–34 High Street in Crieff, Perth and Kinross, Scotland, was designed by George Washington Browne. The building is Category A listed, dating to 1900. It was formerly a British Linen Bank and the Bank Restaurant.

As of 2016, the building was occupied by the Avanti Italian Restaurant, but it has since closed.

== See also ==
- List of listed buildings in Crieff, Perth and Kinross
