= Strathearn Community Campus =

Coordinates: 56.368°N 3.835°W

Location
- Pittenzie Road; Crieff, Perthshire, PH7 3JN; Scotland

Information
- Type: State
- Established: 19th century
- Head teacher: J Donnelly
- Age: 11 to 18
- Enrolment: ~600
- Houses: Turret, Barvick, Kelty
- Website: www.pkc.gov.uk/Strathearn

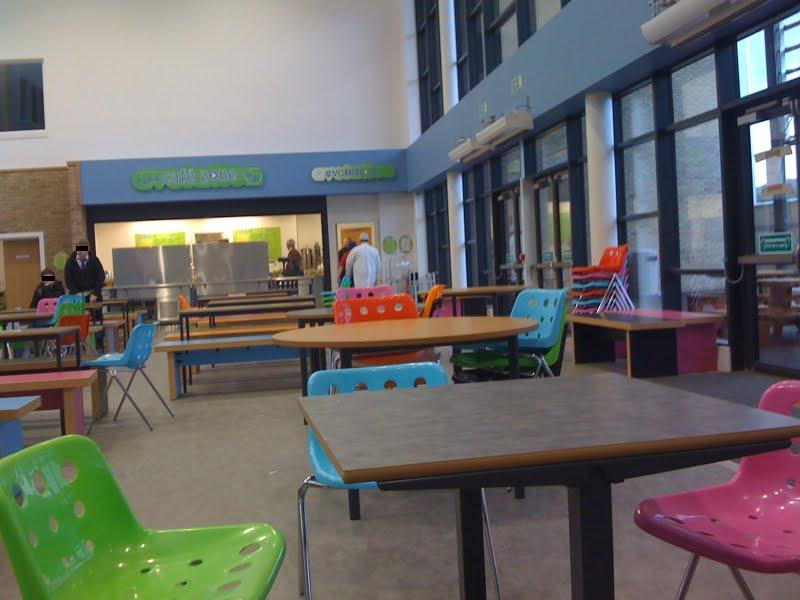
Campus Dining Hall.

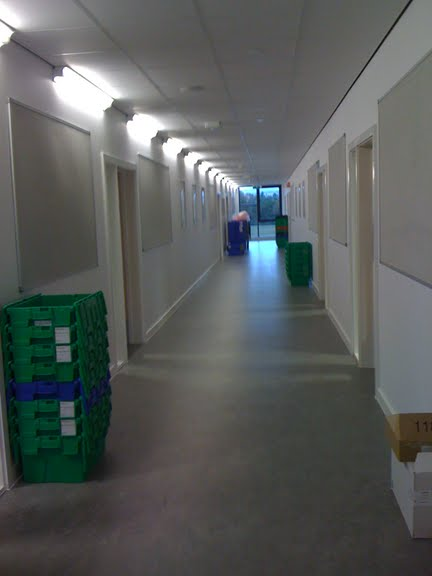
One of the teaching wings inside the campus shortly after the move..

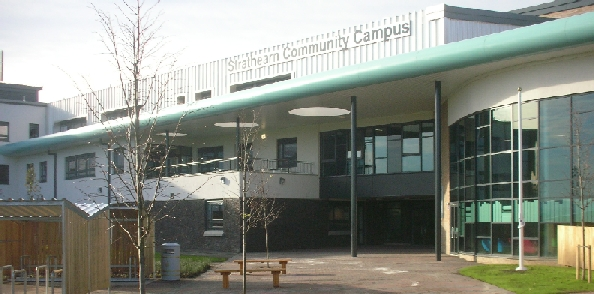
Main entrance to the Strathearn Community Campus.

Strathearn Community Campus is one of six community facilities run by Perth and Kinross Council in Scotland. Each campus provides several amenities and a school for students aged 11–17 years.

SCC is a complex including the replacement building for the original Crieff High School in Crieff, Scotland.

Strathearn Community Campus also acts as a community centre for the local public, and includes the public library, which moved from its old premises in the centre of town to the site. A gym and swimming pool are also open to the public. Also present is what was the Strathearn Recreation Centre, now integrated into the campus, with the fitness gym moved to a larger room in the campus, with new equipment. The campus's outdoor grass, clay and astroturf pitches are all available for public use out of school time; as are the two large PE halls, a moderately sized swimming pool, four squash courts, a large dance theatre and a cinema style assembly hall capable of Blu-ray projection and theatre style drama productions.

The campus is situated on the south-eastern edge of Crieff with outlooks across the town to the mountains of the north and west and across the rich farmland of lower Strathearn to the south and east.

== High school ==
Crieff High School, one of the eleven secondary schools administered by Perth & Kinross Council, is a six-year comprehensive school offering a full range of courses leading to national certification from the Scottish Qualification Authority.

Pupils transfer each year from the associated primary schools of Crieff, Muthill, Braco, Madderty, Greenloaning and Comrie. It also welcomes a consistent intake of pupils from St Dominic's RC Primary School. All Primary 7 pupils from the associated primaries visit the campus for two induction days in June and they also receive visits to their own school from Senior Management and Guidance staff of Strathearn Community Campus.
