= Jane Hyslop (artist) =

Scottish artist (born 1966)

Jane Hyslop is a Scottish artist, born in Edinburgh in 1967. She was a lecturer in art and illustration at the Edinburgh College of Art at the University of Edinburgh until 2025. Hyslop creates artists' books, drawings, and prints. Her work mainly focuses on the natural and the human worlds, and the tension that results when the two meet. Concepts such as place and identity are very important in her art. She is often inspired by her native Midlothian.

Her work has been exhibited and collected by Yale Center for British Art, Tate Library Special Collections, Scottish National Gallery of Modern Art Archive, and the National Library of Scotland.

Hyslop has researched the mining industry and its decline, and the implications of that for Midlothian. She is also interested in Scottish botany, from non-indigenous plants to specimens native to Scotland. Her research focuses on social, architectural, and natural history.

== Education ==
On January 1, 1989, Hyslop earned her Bachelor of Arts degree from the Edinburgh College of Art, and on January 1, 1990, she earned her postgraduate diploma in Drawing and Painting from the same.

== Art process ==
When collecting plants, Hyslop usually collects those that catch her eye and inspire her, though sometimes she collects flora with a specific purpose or project in mind. She is drawn to different plants based on their texture, color, and shape. Many of the plants she collects are species that she is familiar with, as she was around them growing up, particularly in post-industrial areas such as old railroads and mines.

Drawing the plants she collects involves intentional study of the plants' structure and details, such as indentations in the leaves. In an interview by the Meise Botanic Garden, she said that she particularly enjoys noticing and then drawing the little flaws in the plants she finds - tears and other "little traumas" that have made the plants unique.

Hyslop's interest in the industrial side of Scotland and Midlothian partly stems from her family history. Several of her ancestors worked in a Prestonholm flax mill.

Her work usually ends up in book form, partly because Hyslop herself loves books. It is also due to Hyslop working through her research by organizing her art into books. Thus she can identify patterns and connections in her findings. Another reason is that when the art is in a book, its viewers can become almost intimate with it as they feel the paper and study the drawings up close.

== Exhibitions and works ==
From November 27 to December 18 of 2021, the Royal Scottish Academy presented an exhibit called The Christmas Show. Hyslop's gouache and watercolor works February Collection II, Midlothian; Winter Study I, Snowberry and Winter Study II, Honeysuckle; and December Collection II, Midlothian were included.

From February 3 to March 3 of 2024, Hyslop's pochoir prints The Pentlands, After Gillies and The Pentlands, After Gillies II were the primary exhibits in the After Gillies Exhibition at the Royal Scottish Academy, alongside the works of artists such as Kate Downie, James H. Fairgrieve, Lennox Dunbar, and Ronald Forbes.

Hyslop was one of the featured artists at the Inked Up: Printmaking in Scotland Autumn 2024 exhibition at the Edinburgh City Art Centre. Printmaking, while not an exclusively Scottish art, has been an important part of the contributions that Scotland has made to the world's artistry. Hyslop's map of Midlothian, a linocut print, was one of the highlights.

From October 1 to November 1 of 2024, Hyslop's collection The Oak Tree: a tribute to eternity was exhibited at Edinburgh's Fruitmarket art gallery. The collection included drawings and pochoir prints from Hyslop's artist book, which was inspired by the novel Orlando by Virginia Woolf.

There were only 300 copies of The Oak Tree produced. The book covers over seven hundred years of natural and human history woven with fiction. It focuses on the climatic point humankind is at regarding issues such as climate change and the world's fading biological diversity. The Oak Tree blends reference and symbolism in the depicted plants to retell the story in Orlando.

Her other works include January Collection I, Midlothian and February Collection I, Midlothian (pen and gouache), Winter Study I and II, and The State of Nature 2023 I and II (pen and gouache with pochoir).
