= Muthill =

Village in Scotland

Coordinates: 56.32998°N 3.83395°W

Muthill: Scottish Gaelic: Maothail
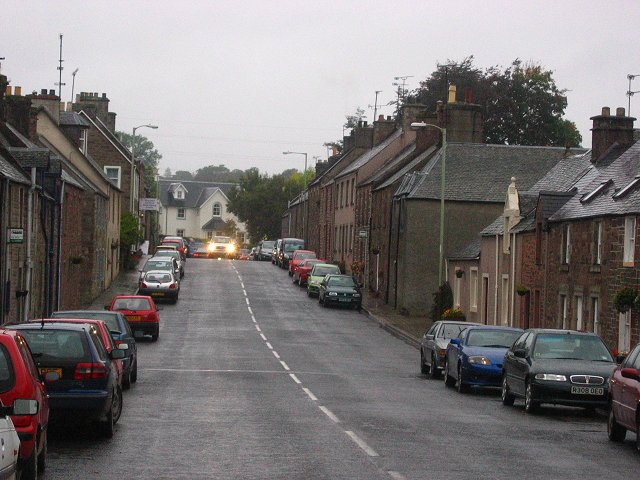

- Location within Perth and Kinross
- Population: 730 (2020)
- OS grid reference: NN867168
- Council area: Perth and Kinross
- Lieutenancy area: Perth and Kinross
- Country: Scotland
- Sovereign state: United Kingdom
- Post town: CRIEFF
- Postcode district: PH5
- Dialling code: 01764
- Police: Scotland
- Fire: Scottish
- Ambulance: Scottish
- UK Parliament: Perth and Kinross-shire
- Scottish Parliament: Perthshire South and Kinross-shire

Muthill (pronounced /ˈmjuːθɪl/) is a village in Perth and Kinross, Scotland. The name derives from Scottish Gaelic Maothail meaning “soft-ground”.

The village lies 3 miles (5 kilometres) south of Crieff, just west of the former railway line connecting Crieff with Gleneagles.

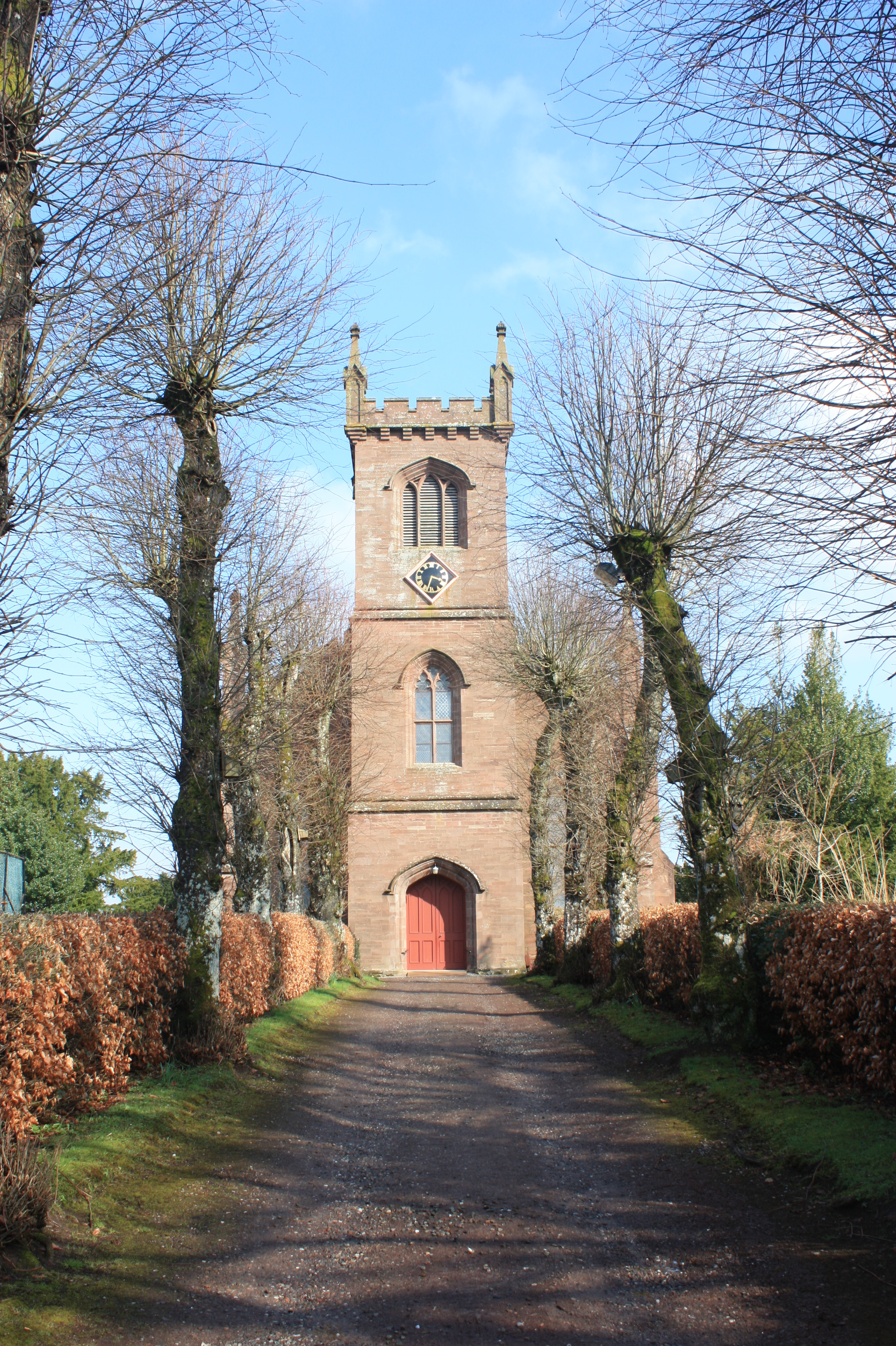
Muthill Parish Church

== History ==
The ancient village was once an important religious centre and the site of a Celí Dé monastery in the 12th century. The church here also served for a time as a seat of the Bishops of Strathearn (later Dunblane) before the building of the cathedral at Dunblane in the 13th century.

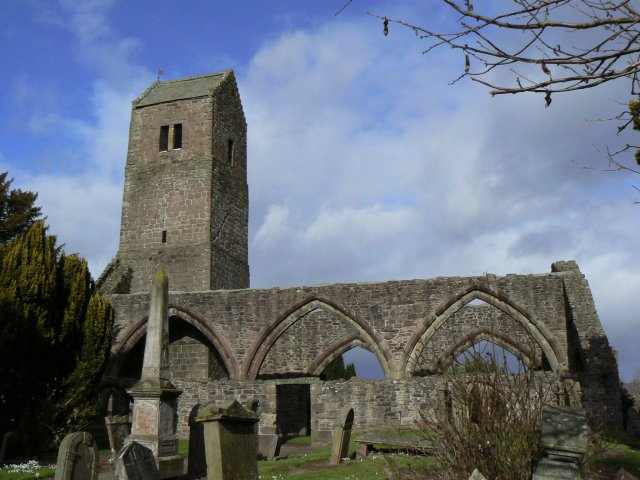
Ruined medieval Church at Muthill

The village was largely destroyed in the 1715–1716 Jacobite rising, by Jacobite troops retreating after their defeat at the Battle of Sheriffmuir, before being rebuilt in the 1740s as it lay on the route of General Wade's military road through Strathearn.

The village was formerly connected to the rail network at Muthill railway station, originally built in 1856 for the Crieff Junction Railway. The line closed on July 6, 1964 as part of the Beeching cuts.

== Buildings ==
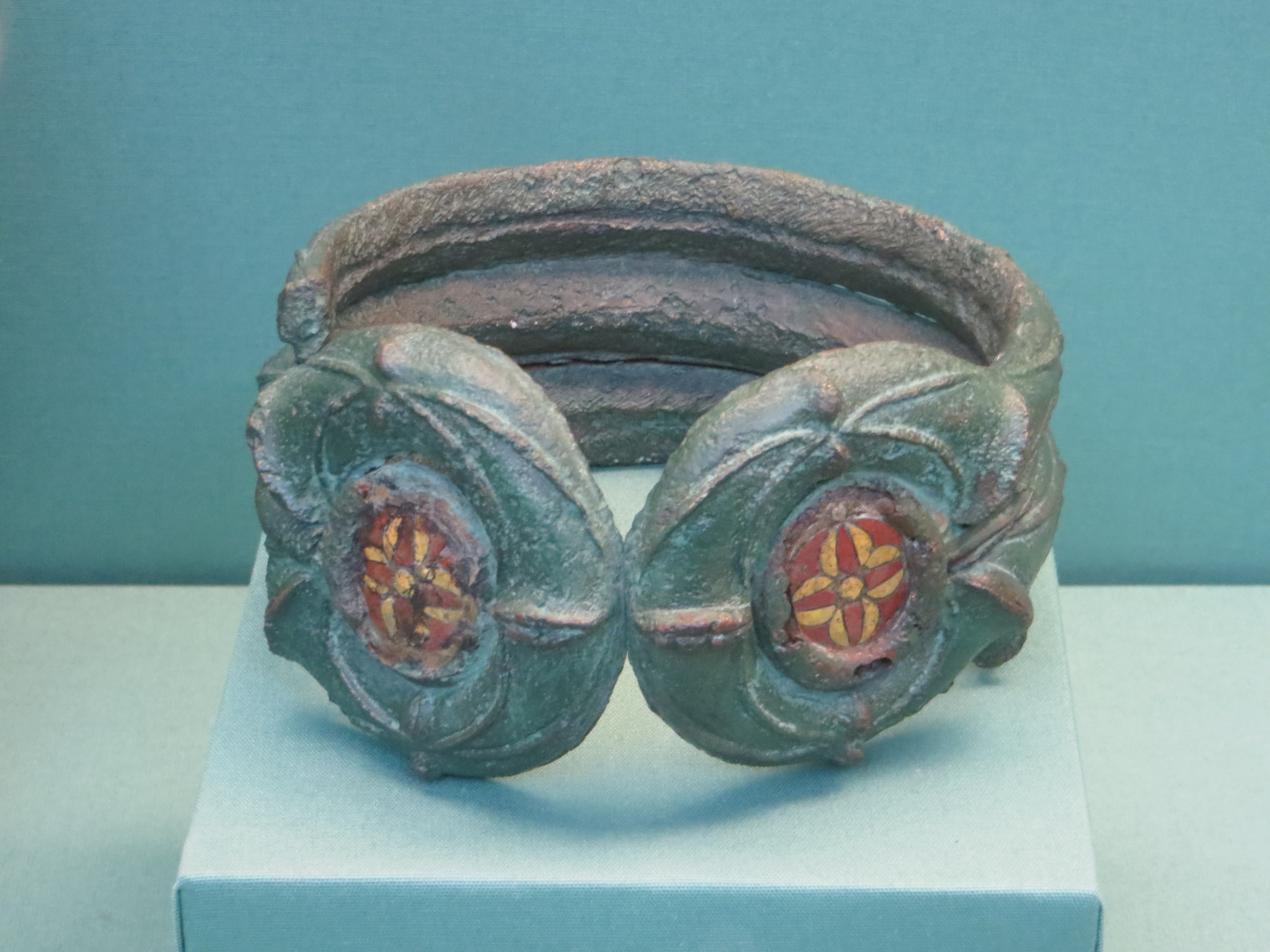
One of a pair of massive brass armlets found at Pitkelloney Farm near Muthill and dating from 50 to 200 AD (British Museum)

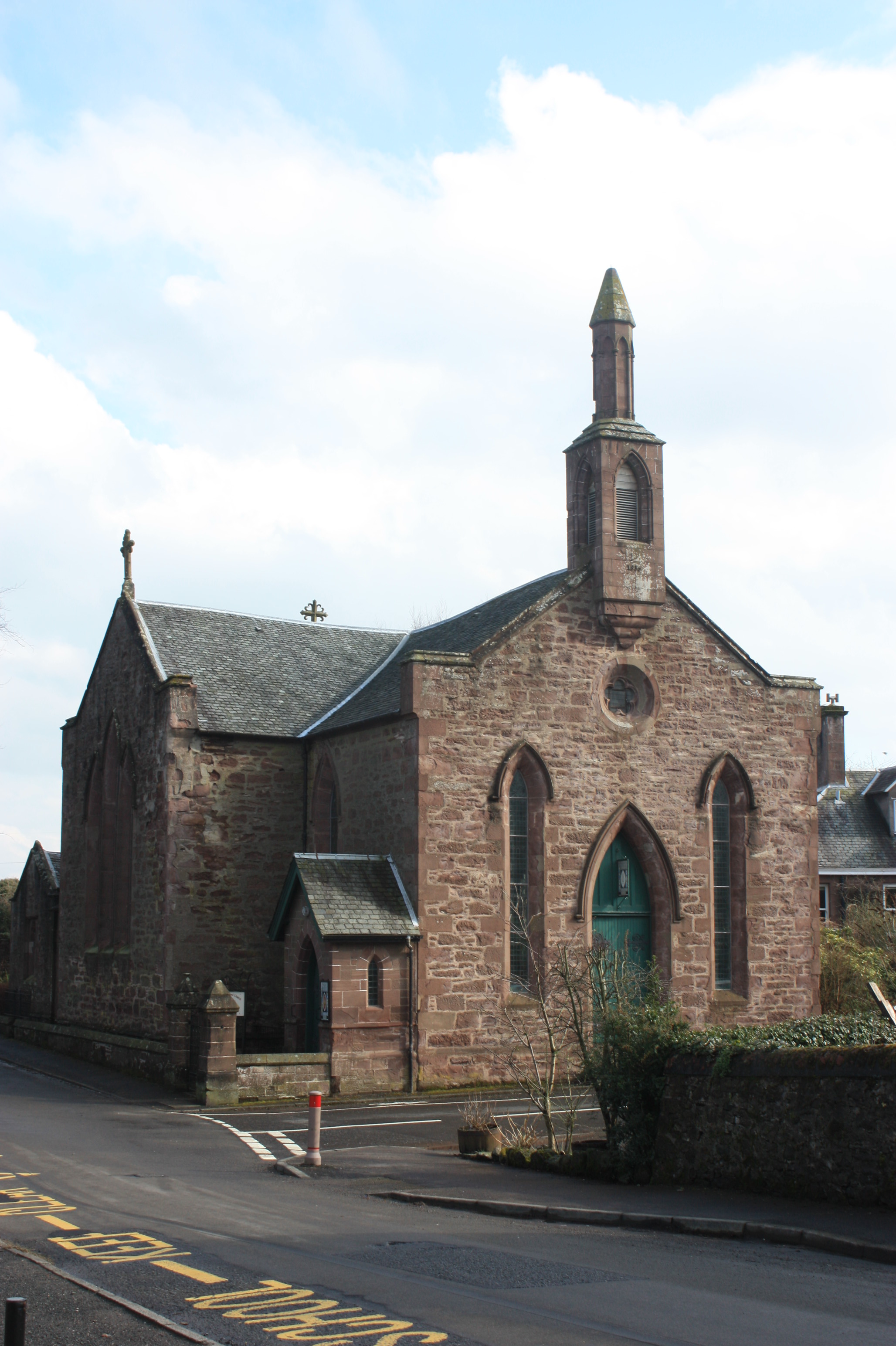
St James Episcopal Church, Muthill

There are around 100 listed buildings in the village, which is designated as a conservation area.

The kirkyard at the centre of the small town contains the ruins of an important 15th-century parish church, which incorporates an 11th-century bell-tower (originally free-standing, and comparable to, though on a smaller scale than, that incorporated into Dunblane Cathedral), built on the orders of Michael Ochiltree, Bishop of Dunblane (in the care of Historic Scotland; no entrance charge). This is almost the only visible reminder of the ancient village. An early Christian cross-slab (perhaps 10th-11th century) and a damaged 13th-century double effigy of an Earl and Countess of Strathearn (formerly within the choir of the church) are preserved within the tower.

St James Episcopal Church dates from 1836 and is designed by R & R Dickson.

Muthill Parish church dates from 1826 and is by James Gillespie Graham, built at a cost of £6900.

Muthill has its own primary school while secondary school pupils attend Strathearn Community Campus in nearby Crieff.

=== Culdee Castle ===
On the eastern edge of Muthill is Culdee Castle. The castle is Category C listed, designed by James Gillespie Graham (who also designed the parish church a few years later) in 1810 and later modified by David Bryce. The castle fell into ruin in the late 1960s but was extensively restored by private owners in the 2020s.

== Notable people ==
- Rev John Barclay (1734–1798), founder of the Berean Church
- John Buchanan (1855–1896), horticulturist and missionary
- David Brydie Mitchell (1766–1837), American politician
- Helen Gloag (1750–1790), slave consort of Mohammed ben Abdallah
- Arabella Rankin (1871–1943), painter

== Trivia ==
In 2011, Muthill embarked upon a Community Action Plan exercise to explore how people envisaged the development of the village.
