= Sheila Stuart =

Scottish author

Sheila Stuart (Gladys May Baker, 1892–1974) was a Scottish writer. She was best known for her children's books, especially among schoolgirls.

== Early life ==
Stuart's father was a Church of Scotland minister: she was born and brought up in a manse in Johnstone, Renfrewshire. She went to school in Glasgow, then entered Leng and Co of Dundee (later incorporated into D. C. Thomson & Co. Ltd), where she trained as a journalist. During the First World War she served as a VAD.

Stuart began her career as a journalist, writing for Scottish Field and The People's Friend, although she also wrote books on antiques during this period.

== Children's writer ==
Stuart is best known for her children's books about Alison and her brother Niall, based in the north-west of Scotland. The publication of every new book in the series caused great excitement "among schoolgirl borrowers", because of their tales of "courage, determination and adventure".

== Death ==
Sheila Stuart died in 1974 in Crieff, Perthshire, where she had moved on her husband's retirement.

== Works ==
- Alison's Highland Holiday (1946)
- More Adventures of Alison (1947)
- Alison's Christmas Adventure (1948)
- Well Done Alison! (1949)
- Alison's Easter Adventure (1950)
- Alison's Poaching Adventure (1951)
- Alison's Kidnapping Adventure (1952)
- Alison's Pony Adventure (1953)
- Alison's Island Adventure (1954)
- Alison's Spy Adventure (1955)
- Alison and the Witch's Cave (1956)
- Alison's Yacht Adventure (1957)
- Alison's Riding Adventure (1958)
- Alison's Cliff Adventure (1959)
- Alison's Caravan Adventure (1960)
- The Riddle of Corran Lodge (1959)

== Sources ==
- Philip, A. The Librarian and the Bookworld, J. Clarke, pp. 43–44, 1954–1955
