= Crieff Town Hall =

Municipal building in Kirkwall, Scotland

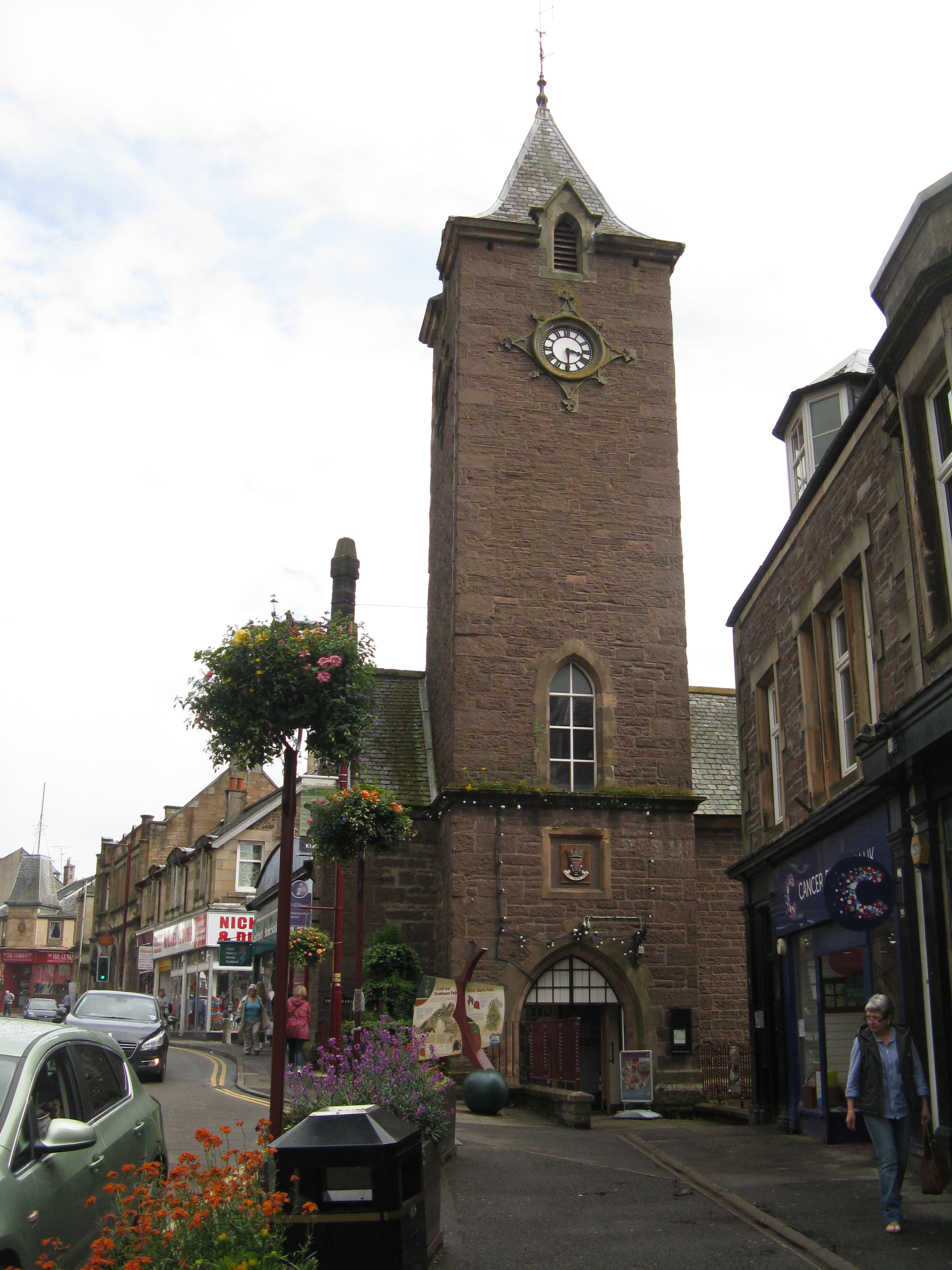
- Crieff Town Hall

- Shown in Perth and Kinross
- 56.3726°N 3.8394°W
- Location: 33 High Street, Crieff

History
- Built: 1850

Site notes
- Architectural style: Scottish medieval style

Listed Building – Category B
- Official name: Town Hall, 33 High Street, Crieff
- Designated: 5 October 1971
- Reference no.: LB23484

Crieff Town Hall is a municipal building in the High Street, Crieff, Perth and Kinross, Scotland. The structure, which currently accommodates the Crieff and Strathearn Museum, is a Category B listed building.

== History ==
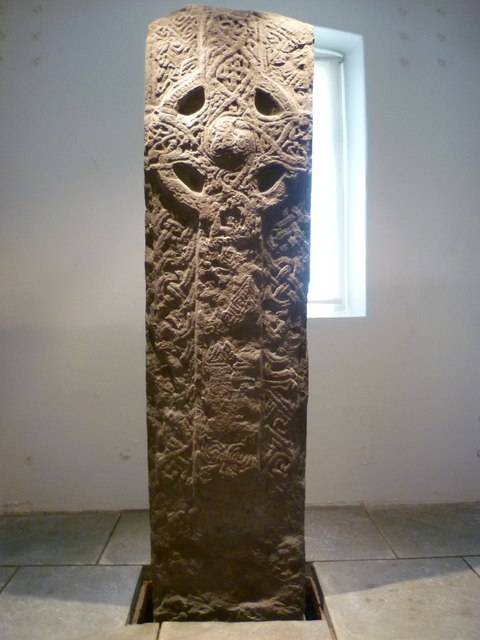
The Burgh Cross inside the town hall

The first municipal building in the town was a tolbooth in the High Street which was completed in 1665. The tolbooth was furnished with a clock and bell which were donated by Lord John Drummond, brother of James Drummond, 2nd Duke of Perth, in the early 18th century. A newer bell was cast by Stephen Miller and Company of Glasgow and installed in the tolbooth in 1821. By the early 19th century, the tolbooth was dilapidated and it was demolished in 1842 in anticipation of a new town hall being erected on the same site. The tolbooth bell was recovered for use in the new building.

The new building was designed in the Scottish medieval style, built in rubble masonry with ashlar dressings and was completed in 1850. The design involved an asymmetrical main frontage of four bays facing west along the High Street. The second bay from the left, which slightly projected forward, was formed by a two-stage tower with an arched doorway with voussoirs surmounted by a coat of arms in the first stage. There was an arched window with voussoirs in the second stage and a set of clock faces high up above. The tower was surmounted by a cornice broken by some louvered gablets, with a pyramid-shaped spire and a weather vane above. The bay to the left was blind, while the two bays to the right were fenestrated by sash windows on the ground floor and by tall arched windows on the first floor, with stepped gables above. Internally, the principal rooms were the prison cells in the basement and the council chamber on the first floor. A marble panel commemorating the life of the former Baron of the Exchequer, Sir Patrick Murray, was installed inside the building.

In the mid-20th century, the burgh council established chambers in North Bank Buildings, the former offices of the North of Scotland Bank in James Square, to accommodate the increasing needs of council officers and their staff. The town hall continued to serve as a meeting place of the burgh council for much of the 20th century but ceased to be the local seat of government when Perth and Kinross District Council was formed in 1975. The ground floor was converted for use as a tourist information centre in 1988 while the basement was fitted out as a local history museum. Artefacts placed on display included the local mercat cross, known as the "Drummond Cross", which was named after the local landowner, James Drummond, 4th Earl of Perth, and dated back to the 17th century. Other items placed on display included the medieval stocks and the "Burgh Cross" which was used as a symbol of religious authority and dated back to the 9th century.

An extensive programme of works, intended to reduce the ingression of damp into the basement, was completed at a cost of £178,000 in 2017. In September 2023, the trustees of the Crieff and Strathearn Museum leased the building from Perth and Kinross Council. Over the next 6 months the trustees worked to create a museum which was officially opened by the former member of parliament, Rory Stewart, on 3 May 2024.

== See also ==
- List of listed buildings in Crieff, Perth and Kinross
