= Highlandman =

Overview
- Service type: Passenger train
- First service: 11 July 1927
- Last service: 1939
- Former operator(s): LNER

Route
- Termini: London Kings Cross; Fort William and Inverness
- Service frequency: Daily

The Highlandman was a named passenger train operating in the United Kingdom.

== History ==
The Highlandman was introduced by the London and North Eastern Railway on 11 July 1927 as an additional sleeping car express train departing King's Cross at 7.25pm for Inverness, Fort William and the Western Highlands. It carried an additional sleeping car portion for Nairn which was disconnected at Aviemore.

The train became so popular for getting to Scotland for the Glorious Twelfth shooting season, that it ran as five separate trains on 11 August 1930.

The last summer service was operated in 1939, after which the service was suspended because of the outbreak of the Second World War, and unlike other named trains, it did not resume afterwards.
