= Jackie Dewar =

Scottish footballer

Jack Dewar
Personal information
- Full name: John Keddie Dewar
- Date of birth: 14 December 1923
- Place of birth: Buckhaven, Scotland
- Date of death: 19 October 2011 (aged 87)
- Place of death: Crook of Devon, Scotland
- Position: Left winger

Youth career
- Bayview YC

Senior career*
Years	Team	Apps	(Gls)
1946–1947	Heart of Midlothian	3	(3)
1947–1951	Dundee United	47	(9)
1951–1952	Forfar Athletic	0	(0)
- * Club domestic league appearances and goals

John Keddie Dewar (14 December 1923 – 19 October 2011) was a Scottish footballer who played as a left winger. Dewar began his footballing career shortly after the Second World War with Heart of Midlothian, scoring three goals in as many appearances before moving to Dundee United in 1947. After four years at Tannadice, Dewar moved to Forfar Athletic, where he failed to make an appearance. Dewar left part-time professional football in 1952 to take up a full-time career as a mining surveyor and planner with the National Coal Board.
