= Ronald Forbes (artist) =

Scottish artist (born 1947)

- Born: 1947 (age 78–79); Braco, Scotland
- Awards: Guthrie Award, 1979

Ronald Forbes RSA, RGI (born 1947) is a Scottish artist who is primarily a painter but who has also made films throughout his career. He is an academician of the Royal Scottish Academy (elected Associate, 1996, Academician, 2005), was elected a Professional Member of the Society of Scottish Artists in 1971 and a member of the Royal Glasgow Institute of the Fine Arts in 2013.

Forbes studied at Edinburgh College of Art from 1964–1968, and was awarded an S.E.D postgraduate scholarship there from 1968–1969. He later studied education at Jordanhill College, Glasgow, from 1970–71.

After periods between 1969 and 1973 when he taught in the secondary and further education sectors, Forbes moved into teaching posts in art schools. He was Head of Painting in both Crawford School of Art, Cork (1974–78) and Duncan of Jordanstone College of Art and Design, University of Dundee (1995–2001), where he also established and directed the Masters Course in Public Art and Design and the MFA Course from 1983–1995. He was a lecturer at Glasgow School of Art (1979–2003), and is Honorary Visiting Professor of Fine Art at the University of Abertay, Dundee, (2003–present).

He has also served on the boards of a range of trusts and arts charities including Hospitalfield Arts, Perthshire Public Arts Trust, Dundee Public Art Programme, Workshop and Artist Studio Provision Scotland (WASPS) and the Glasgow League of Artists.

== The Work ==
Forbes’s art reflects the complex visual languages of modern life while referencing mythology and art history, and, as Dr Tom Normand wrote in "Portfolio: Treasures from the Diploma Collection of the Royal Scottish Academy", 2013, "his work has explored a philosophical discourse that speculates on the nature of reality." Dr Peter Hill noted in his essay in "Ronald Forbes: (mind)games", 2005 that Forbes is regarded as one of Scotland’s leading figurative painters, while Dr Carol Gow, writing in Cencrastus issue 36, 1990, noted that Forbes prefers the term "imagist" rather than "figurative."

Dennis Adrian, Chicago historian, critic and collector, wrote in Riddles and Puzzles: Paintings by Ronald Forbes,

"Ronald Forbes is a metaphysical painter out of the necessities of his own perceptions. His metaphysical qualities are those which can be found in much modern and older art; a sensibility which evidences an unshakeable conviction that the full perception and comprehension of our experience are not and cannot be achieved through logic alone and that there are other forms of knowledge to which we have access in art through images and symbols as well as the forms and colors which manifest them.

In Forbes’s painting, this sort of awareness (logical thought plus perceptual awareness) is a disrupted state in which no one single structural system or vocabulary of images has primacy. Accordingly, Forbes’s imagery seems never to be presented through a consistent and uniform language of form and image, but usually presents several such systems simultaneously within a "single" composition. The result has been called collage-like."

== Professional activity ==
There have been solo, group and curated exhibitions of Forbes’s work in Scotland, England, Ireland, USA, Australia, Japan, France and the Netherlands. His paintings are held in a range of public collections in the UK, Ireland, the USA, Poland and Australia. He has received many prizes, including the Guthrie Medal from the Royal Scottish Academy, and awards from bodies such as the Leverhulme Trust, the Carnegie Trust, the Scottish Arts Council and the Hope-Scott Trust.

His films have been shown in many exhibitions and have been part of the official selection for film festivals including Glasgow Short Film Festival, Abstracta Film Festival, Rome, Italy Lucerne International Film Festival, Switzerland and Skepto Film Festival, Cagliari, Italy.

Throughout his career, Forbes has fulfilled a number of artist residencies in Scotland, The Netherlands and Australia, including the Leverhulme Senior Art Fellowship at the University of Strathclyde, 1973–74, Artist in Residence in Livingston New Town, 1978–80, the Scottish Arts Council Amsterdam Studio Award 1980, Artist in Residence at the University of Tasmania Art School, Hobart, Australia in 1995, and the Leverhulme Trust Artist in Residence at the Scottish Crop Research Institute (now the James Hutton Institute) 2006–08.

Forbes has been curator of a number of exhibitions such as ‘Focus on Film’ at the Royal Scottish Academy, Edinburgh, Scotland in 2014 and the Celtic Connections Festival Visual Art Exhibition, Glasgow, Scotland in 1994 and 1995. He has also been founder and organiser of artists groups including the Glasgow League of Artists in 1971.

== Solo exhibitions ==
2023 “The Everyman Variations” The Academicians’ Gallery, Royal Scottish Academy, Edinburgh
2021 “The Dreamweaver’s Puzzles” Festival Exhibition Scottish Arts Club, Edinburgh
2018 “Inside Out” Studio Pavilion Gallery, The House for an Art Lover, Glasgow
2011 “De Rerum Natura: The Meaning of Things” Perth Museum and Art Gallery, Perth, Scotland
2010 “De Rerum Natura: The Meaning of Things” Collins Gallery, University of Strathclyde, Glasgow, Scotland
2010 “De Rerum Natura: The Meaning of Things” John Hope Gateway Centre, Botanics, Edinburgh, Scotland
2009 “De Rerum Natura: The Meaning of Things” Hannah Maclure Centre, University of Abertay, Dundee, Scotland
2009 “De Rerum Natura,” Digital-Collage Prints" Edinburgh International Science Festival, CAC, Edinburgh, Scotland
2008 “Ronald Forbes: Paintings” Scottish Art Club, Edinburgh, Scotland
2007 “De Natura” Hamnavoe Gallery, Aberdeen, Scotland
2005 “mind-games” Hannah Maclure Centre, University of Abertay, Dundee, Scotland
2005 “Indian Summer” Smith Art Gallery and Museum, Stirling, Scotland
2003 “Indian Summer” Crawford Arts Centre, St Andrews, Scotland
2001 “Riddles” Vardy Gallery, Sunderland, England
2001 “Indian Summer” Royal Over-Seas League Gallery, Edinburgh, Scotland
2001 “Indian Summer” Fine Art Gallery, University of Tasmania, Australia
2000 “Indian Summer” Royal Over-Seas League Gallery, London, England
1999 “Ronald Forbes: Drawings” Southern Illinois University Museum, Carbondale, USA
1999 “Ronald Forbes: Catalogue of Disasters and Other Paintings” Sonia Zaks Gallery, Chicago, USA

1997 “Catalogue of Disasters” De Keerder Kunstkamer, Cadier en Keer, Netherlands
1996 “Consuming Passions” NS Gallery, Glasgow, Scotland
1995 “Vegetable Lamb and Other Travellers’ Tails” Plimsoll Gallery, Hobart, Tasmania, Australia
1995 “All Consuming Landscape” Seagate Gallery, Dundee, Scotland
1995 “All Consuming Landscape” An Lanntair Gallery, Stornoway, Isle of Lewis, Scotland
1991 “Paintings and Related Works” Maclaurin Art Ga1lery, Ayr, Scotland
1991 “Paintings and Related Works” Perth Museum and Art Gallery, Scotland
1990 “Paintings and Related Works” Seagate Gallery, Dundee, Scotland
1986 “Robbie McRuse: Drawings and Paintings” Mayfest Exhibition, Babbity Bowster, Glasgow, Scotland
1984 “World State Circus Paintings” Drian Galleries, London, England
1983 “Ronald Forbes: Paintings 1973-1983” Compass Gallery, Glasgow, Scotland
1980 “Ronald Forbes: Paintings” Third Eye Centre, Glasgow, Scotland
1980 “Ronald Forbes: Paintings” Forebank Gallery, Dundee, Scotland
1980 “Ronald Forbes: Paintings” The Lanthorn, Livingston, Scotland
1978 “Ronald Forbes: Paintings” Cork Art Society Gallery, Cork, Ireland
1976 “Ronald Forbes: Paintings and Films” Project Arts Centre, Dublin, Ireland
1976 “TV Series to Roadworks?” Cork Art Society Gallery, Ireland
1975 “Recent TV Series Paintings” Drian Galleries, London, England
1974 “Leverhulme Fellowship Exhibition” Collins Gallery, Glasgow, Scotland
1974 “Back to Nature” Goethe Institute, Glasgow, Scotland
1973 “Back to Nature” Compass Gallery, Glasgow, Scotland

== Curated exhibitions ==
2018 From the Sublime to the Concrete
The Scottish Gallery, Edinburgh, curated by Derrick Guild

2018 Under the Goldie Fish: Views of Cork from the Collection
Crawford Art Gallery, Cork, Ireland.

2017-18 Music, Myth and Magic
Crawford Art Gallery, Cork, Ireland, work from the permanent collection

2016-2018 A Sense of Place
McManus, Dundee’s City Art Gallery and Museum, work from the permanent collection

2010-15 RSA Annual Exhibition Curated Section:
2015 Realised, curator Alan Robb
2014 Focus on Film, curator Ronald Forbes
2010 The Expressive Artist and Social Involvement curator Ian McCulloch
2014 Life Cycles: John Grant Clifford, Ronnie Forbes, Alastair Ross

2014 Life Cycles: John Grant Clifford, Ronnie Forbes, Alastair Ross
Tatha Gallery, Newport-on-Tay

2006 Parallel Paths, Doug Cocker and Ronald Forbes
The drawing and development processes of each artist.
Royal Scottish Academy, Edinburgh

2002 Nature: Only and Idea, Ronald Forbes, Nicole Hardy and Jannel:
Galerie Trace, Maastricht, Netherlands

1983 Netherlands and Belgium Touring Exhibition, Ronald Forbes, John Nelson and Cameron Shaw,
British Council/Culturele Raad Limburg
Hoensbruck, Roermond, Maastricht and Liege

1978-79 Scottish Arts Council Touring Exhibition, Ronald Forbes and Alan Robb:
1979 Aberdeen Art Gallery
1978 Fruit Market Gallery, Edinburgh
1978 Collins Gallery, Glasgow
1978 Arts Council Gallery, Belfast

== Prizes and awards ==
2021 Sir William Gillies Bequest Award, Royal Scottish Academy
2019 Scottish Arts Club Award, RSA Annual Exhibition
2014 Dundee Visual Artists Award Scheme award
2012 Award of Merit, Lucerne International Film Festival for "Joking Apart"
2009 Publication award, the Carnegie Trust for the Universities of Scotland
2009 Dundee Visual Artists Award Scheme award
2006 Leverhulme Artist in Residence Award at SCRI
2002 Publication award, the Carnegie Trust for the Universities of Scotland
2001 Shortlisted for Rootstein-Hopkins Major Sabbatical Award
1999 Sir William Gillies Bequest Award, Royal Scottish Academy
1996 Highland Society of London Award, Royal Scottish Academy
1994 Commendation, Aberdeen Artists Exhibition
1990 Hope Scott Trust Award
1980 S.A.C. Amsterdam Studio Award
1979 Scottish Arts Council Award for Film-making
1979 R.S.A. Guthrie Award, Royal Scottish Academy
1975 Prize for film, "Between Dreams" in BBC "Scope" Film Competition
1968 Prize in Scottish Young Contemporaries Exhibition
1967 1st prize in first Scottish Young Contemporaries Exhibition
1964–69 Numerous awards and prizes at Edinburgh College of Art
