= Gleneagles railway station =

Railway station in Perth and Kinross, Scotland

Gleneagles Scottish Gaelic: Gleann Eagas
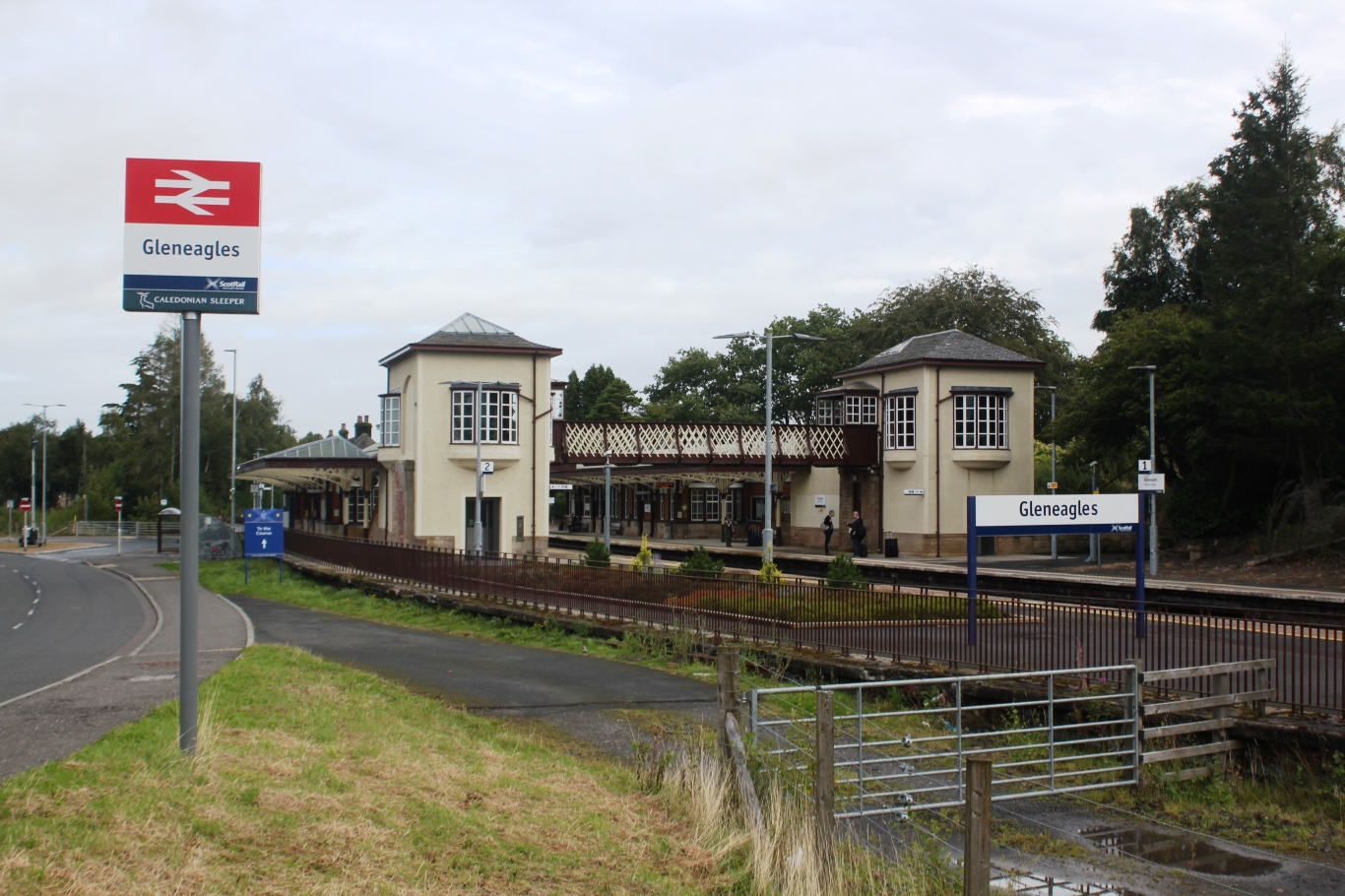

General information
- Location: Auchterarder, Perth and Kinross; Scotland
- Coordinates: 56.2750°N 3.7310°W
- Grid reference: NN929105
- Manager: ScotRail
- Platforms: 2

Other information
- Station code: GLE

History
- Original company: Scottish Central Railway
- Pre-grouping: Caledonian Railway
- Post-grouping: LMSR

Key dates
- 14 March 1856: Opened as Crieff Junction
- 1 April 1912: Renamed Gleneagles

Passengers
- 2020/21: ▼12,160
- 2021/22: ▲65,680
- 2022/23: ▲76,370
- 2023/24: ▲95,588
- 2024/25: ▲0.105 million
Location
Notes
- Passenger statistics from the Office of Rail and Road

Gleneagles railway station serves the town of Auchterarder in Perth and Kinross, Scotland.

== History ==
The station was opened by the Scottish Central Railway on 14 March 1856 and was originally named Crieff Junction.. The branch northwestward to Crieff was opened (by the Crieff Junction Railway company) on the same day. On 1 April 1912 it was renamed Gleneagles.

The station was rebuilt and the junction remodelled by the Caledonian Railway in 1919 following their takeover of the Scottish Central Railway. The Caledonian Railway built the nearby Gleneagles Hotel, which opened in 1925. The hotel served as the location for the G8 summit in 2005 and is a well-known golf resort; Gleneagles hosted the 2014 Ryder Cup.

In anticipation of the 2014 Ryder Cup, Gleneagles railway station underwent a major refurbishment as part of a £7 million program to improve transport infrastructure in the area. Work was completed in April 2014, seeing the old station building regenerated with a lift, new platforms built upon the original ones, the fitting of Passenger information boards, additional regenerative paint work and a newly built car park built to connect with the new main road entrance to the station from the A9 trunk road.

The branch line to Crieff closed on 6 July 1964 due to the Beeching Axe.

== Services ==
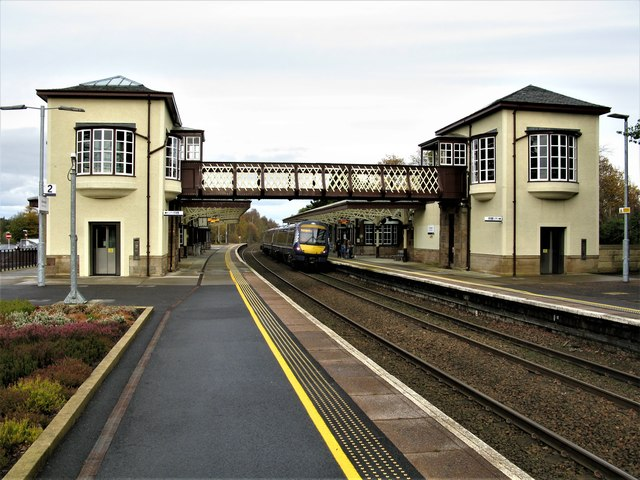
A Class 170 at Gleneagles

On weekdays and Saturdays there is a basic hourly service to Glasgow Queen Street southbound and northbound to Dundee, with one early morning service extending to Aberdeen and one evening peak service extending to Arbroath. On Sundays, a roughly two-hourly service is provided by additional calls on the Aberdeen to Glasgow services, with also two morning services to Edinburgh.

Gleneagles is also served by the daily Highland Chieftain service between Inverness and London King's Cross at 10:15 on Monday-Saturday and 12:17 on Sundays and the Caledonian Sleeper to London Euston each evening except Saturdays. Passengers intending to travel to Edinburgh should change at Dunblane or Stirling.

Preceding station	National Rail	Following station
Dunblane	London North Eastern Railway; Highland Chieftain	Perth
Dunblane	ScotRail; Glasgow–Dundee line	Perth
Dunblane	Caledonian Sleeper; Highland Caledonian Sleeper	Perth
	Historical railways	
Blackford; Line open; Station closed	Caledonian Railway; Scottish Central Railway	Auchterarder; Line open; Station closed
Terminus	Caledonian Railway; Crieff Junction Railway	Tullibardine; Line and Station closed

== See also ==
- Public transport in Perth and Kinross

== Sources ==
- Brailsford, Martyn, ed. (December 2017) [1987]. Railway Track Diagrams 1: Scotland & Isle of Man (6th ed.). Frome: Trackmaps. ISBN 978-0-9549866-9-8.
- Butt, R. V. J. (October 1995). The Directory of Railway Stations: details every public and private passenger station, halt, platform and stopping place, past and present (1st ed.). Sparkford: Patrick Stephens Ltd. ISBN 978-1-85260-508-7. OCLC 60251199. OL 11956311M.
- Jowett, Alan (March 1989). Jowett's Railway Atlas of Great Britain and Ireland: From Pre-Grouping to the Present Day (1st ed.). Sparkford: Patrick Stephens Ltd. ISBN 978-1-85260-086-0. OCLC 22311137.
- Marshall, Peter (1998). The Scottish Central Railway: Perth to Stirling. Usk, Monmouthshire: Oakwood Press. ISBN 0-8536-1522-5.
