= Crieff Junction Railway =

Former railway line in Scotland

Crieff Junction Railway RDT
Overview
- Locale: Scotland
- Dates of operation: 15 August 1853–29 June 1865
- Successor: Scottish Central Railway

Technical
- Track gauge: 4 ft 8 1/2 in (1,435 mm)

The Crieff Junction Railway was opened in 1856 to link the town of Crieff to the main line railway network in Scotland, at a junction at the present day Gleneagles station (then called Crieff Junction). In the second half of the twentieth century, railway business declined sharply, and despite economic measures, the line closed in 1964.

== History ==
=== The Scottish Central Railway ===
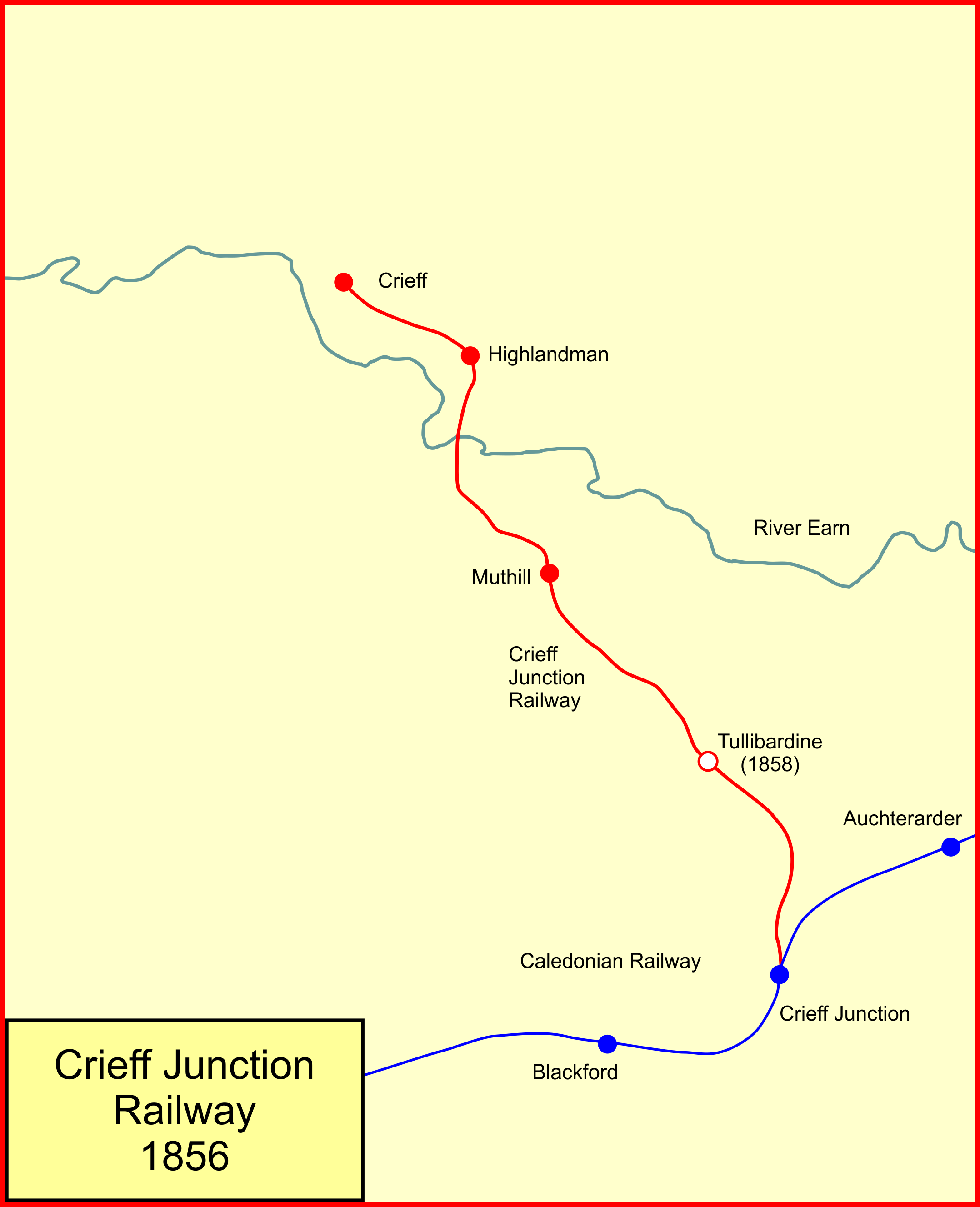
System map of the Crieff Junction Railway

The Scottish Central Railway (SCR) was authorised by the Scottish Central Railway Act 1845 (8 & 9 Vict. c. clxi) on 31 July 1845. It was to build a main line from the Edinburgh and Glasgow Railway near Castlecary to Perth. Early on it allied itself with the Edinburgh and Glasgow Railway and the Caledonian Railway, as it was dependent on one or both of them for access to Glasgow and Edinburgh. For some years Parliament refused to allow amalgamation of the SCR with either of the other lines.

The authorising act included a branch line to Crieff from "a location east of the summit near Greenloaning". This was the later Gleneagles, but at that time there was no settlement in the area, and the station at the junction was to be simply for exchange purposes. The SCR found that construction of its main line was more demanding, of time and of money, than it anticipated, and it allowed the Crieff branch to be put into abeyance.

=== The Crieff Junction Railway is formed ===
Crieff Junction Railway Act 1853
- Act of Parliament
- Parliament of the United Kingdom
- Long title: An Act for making a Railway from the Scottish Central Railway near Loaninghead to the Town of Crieff.
- Citation: 16 & 17 Vict. c. clxxxviii

Dates
- Royal assent: 15 August 1853

Text of statute as originally enacted

Crieff was the second largest town in Perthshire, and the branch line to Crieff had to be built. The SCR arranged for a nominally independent company, the Crieff Junction Railway (CJR) to be formed; it obtained its authorising act of Parliament, the Crieff Junction Railway Act 1853 (16 & 17 Vict. c. clxxxviii) on 15 August 1853. The Scottish Central Railway was to work the line at cost, with one-third of the feeder business brought to the SCR allowed to the Crieff Junction Railway Company.

The engineer Thomas Bouch was appointed as Engineer of the line. However, at this time, he had many other commitments, and he was unable to devote much time to the Crieff Junction line. As a result, the construction process was very slow; the promised opening dates were repeatedly missed. Staff had been engaged for the earlier opening dates and then stood down when it was obvious there would be nothing for them to do. As completion day neared, there was a serious dispute over payments with the contractor for the line, and further delay followed. Muthill station had three station masters in succession before the opening of the line.

=== Opening of the line ===
Opening day was finally set for 13 March 1856, but the troubles were not over yet. The SCR refused to allow its locomotive to traverse the pointwork at Crieff Junction station on the grounds that it was unsafe. A modification resolved the matter, but the first trains did not run until the following day.

The SCR considered Crieff Junction to be an interchange point only, and this led to a dispute with the CJR, as they wished to allow travellers to make round trips to the junction without alighting. This was finally agreed to by the SCR, but measures were put in place to ensure that no illicit onward travel from the junction took place.

=== Gleneagles hotel ===
To encourage a wealthy tourist trade, the Caledonian Railway decided to construct a luxury hotel at Gleneagles; it was to be built with an associated golf course. A subsidiary company called Gleneagles Limited was set up in 1913 to manage the construction, but the outbreak of World War I caused the suspension of the project during hostilities. The hotel was opened in 1924; during the construction process, the railways of Great Britain had been "grouped" under the Railways Act 1921, and the Caledonian Railway was a constituent of the new London, Midland and Scottish Railway (LMS); the Gleneagles Hotel passed to the ownership of the LMS.

During World War II, the hotel closed and became a military hospital and, subsequently, a rehabilitation centre for miners. It reopened as a hotel in May 1947.

The hotel had a siding connection for goods transfer throughout the lifetime of the Crieff branch line.

=== Absorption ===
Scottish Central and Crieff Junction Railways Amalgamation Act 1865
- Act of Parliament
- Parliament of the United Kingdom
- Long title: An Act to authorize the Amalgamation of the Crieff Junction Railway Company with the Scottish Central Railway Company; and for other Purposes.
- Citation: 28 & 29 Vict. c. cxxxiv

Dates
- Royal assent: 29 June 1865

Text of statute as originally enacted

The Crieff Junction Railway was absorbed by the Scottish Central Railway by the Scottish Central and Crieff Junction Railways Amalgamation Act 1865 (28 & 29 Vict. c. cxxxiv) on 29 June 1865.

== Closure ==
There were attempts to make the line more profitable, specifically with the introduction diesel railcars in the late 1950s; two additional halts were opened on the line, at Pittenzie and Strageath. Nonetheless, the line was heavily loss-making, and it was closed as part of the process of rationalisation of the railways known as the Beeching Axe; the closure took effect on 6 July 1964. The track was lifted the following year.

== Since closure ==
The impressive station building at Crieff was demolished in 1965, and the site was subsequently occupied by a health centre and cottage hospital. The station buildings at Muthill were also demolished shortly after the closure of the line.

The remaining station buildings along the route were altered to use as private housing.

== Topography ==
The line opened on 14 March 1856, and closed on 6 July 1964.

- Crieff;
- Pittenzie Halt; opened 15 September 1958;
- Highlandman; open from July 1856; closed 1 January 1917; reopened 1 February 1919;
- Strageath Halt; opened 15 September 1958;
- Muthill;
- Tullibardine; open from May 1857;
- Crieff Junction; trailing junction into main line towards Stirling; renamed Gleneagles on 1 April 1912; it was reconstructed in its present form in 1919; the station is still open, serving trains on the main line.
