= Crieff =

Market town in Perth and Kinross, Scotland

Coordinates: 56.37568°N 3.84262°W

Crieff: Scottish Gaelic: Craoibh; Scots: Crieff
- Town
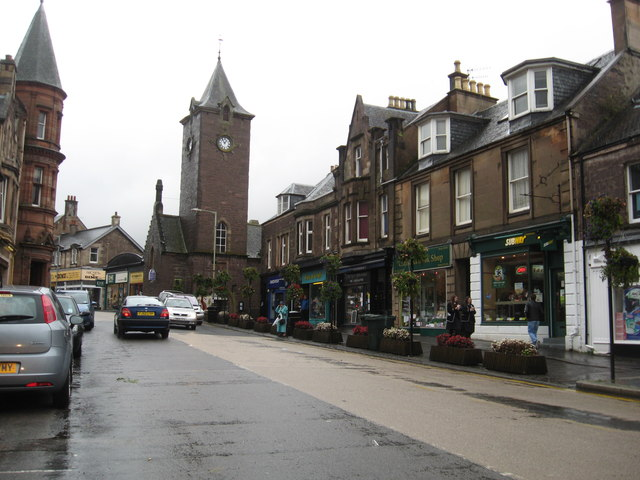
- High Street, Crieff with Crieff Town Hall in the centre distance

- Location within Perth and Kinross
- Population: 7,142 (2022)
- OS grid reference: NN863219
  - Edinburgh: 38 mi (61 km)
  - London: 368 mi (592 km)
- Community council: Crieff
- Council area: Perth and Kinross
- Lieutenancy area: Perth and Kinross
- Country: Scotland
- Sovereign state: United Kingdom
- Post town: CRIEFF
- Postcode district: PH7
- Dialling code: 01764
- Police: Scotland
- Fire: Scottish
- Ambulance: Scottish
- UK Parliament: Perth and Kinross-shire
- Scottish Parliament: Perthshire South and Kinross-shire

Crieff (/kriːf/; Scottish Gaelic: Craoibh, meaning "tree") is a Scottish market town in Perth and Kinross on the A85 road between Perth and Crianlarich, and the A822 between Greenloaning and Aberfeldy. The A822 joins the A823 to Dunfermline. It had a population of 7,142 in 2022.

Crieff has become a hub for tourism, famous for whisky and its history of cattle droving. Attractions include the Caithness Glass Visitor Centre, Crieff Hydro Hotel and Glenturret Distillery. The nearby Innerpeffray Library (founded about 1680) is Scotland's oldest lending library. St Mary's Chapel beside it dates from 1508. Both are open to the public: the library is run by a charitable trust; the chapel is in the care of Historic Environment Scotland.

== History ==
For centuries Highlanders came to Crieff to sell their black cattle, whose meat and hides were sought by the growing urban populations in Lowland Scotland and the north of England. The town acted as a gathering point for the Michaelmas cattle sale held during the "October Tryst" each year, when the surrounding fields and hillsides would be black with some 30,000 cattle, some from as far away as Caithness and the Outer Hebrides.

Rob Roy MacGregor and his followers visited Crieff in October 1714: they gathered in Crieff for the October Tryst. They marched to Crieff Town Square and, in front of the gathering crowd, sang Jacobite songs and drank loyal toasts to their uncrowned King James VIII.

In 1716, 350 Highlanders returning from the Battle of Sheriffmuir burned most of Crieff to the ground. In 1731, James Drummond, 3rd Duke of Perth, laid out the town's central James Square and established a textile industry with a flax factory. In the 1745 rising, the Highlanders were itching to fire the town again and were reported as saying "she shoud be a braw toun gin she haed anither sing". It was saved by the Duke of Perth, a friend and supporter of Prince Charles. In February 1746, the Jacobite army was quartered in and around the town, with Prince Charles Edward Stuart holding his final war council in the old Drummond Arms Inn in James Square, located behind the present abandoned hotel building in Hill Street.

By the late 18th century, the hanging tree used by the Earls of Strathearn to punish criminals had been replaced by a wooden structure in an area called Gallowhaugh, now Gallowhill, at the bottom of Burrell Street. What is now Ford Road was Gallowford Road which led down past the gallows to the crossing point over the River Earn. Sir Walter Scott, visiting Crieff in 1796, saw the gallows as "Gallowsford".

Crieff Town Hall was completed in 1850. In the 19th century, Crieff became a fashionable destination for tourists visiting the Highlands and a country retreat for wealthy businessmen from Edinburgh, Glasgow and beyond. Many such visitors attended the Crieff hydropathic establishment, now the Crieff Hydro, which opened in 1868.

Crieff was once served by Crieff railway station, which linked the town to Perth, Comrie and Gleneagles. The station was opened in 1856 by the Crieff Junction Railway but was closed in 1964 by British Railways as part of the Beeching cuts.

== Fame in verse ==
Crieff was praised by the poetaster William McGonagall in "Crieff".

"Ye lovers of the picturesque, if ye wish to drown your grief,
Take my advice, and visit the ancient town of Crieff."

It is also referenced by Half Man Half Biscuit in "Man of constant sorrow".

"A yacht on his window sill, according to some
Alludes to a tragedy which rendered him numb
To cope with the grief and the hurt and the loss
He exited Crieff, Perth and Kinross"

== Events ==
Every year the town hosts the Crieff Highland Games, which include music and dancing competitions and feats of strength.

== Schools ==
- Morrison's Academy
- Ardvreck School
- St Dominics RC Primary School
- Crieff Primary School – A historic picture of Crieff Primary School, see The Schoolmaster, (1953) black and white, 19 minutes. The schoolmaster is played by Walter Carr and the film is narrated by Gordon Jackson.
- Strathearn Community Campus

== Places of worship ==
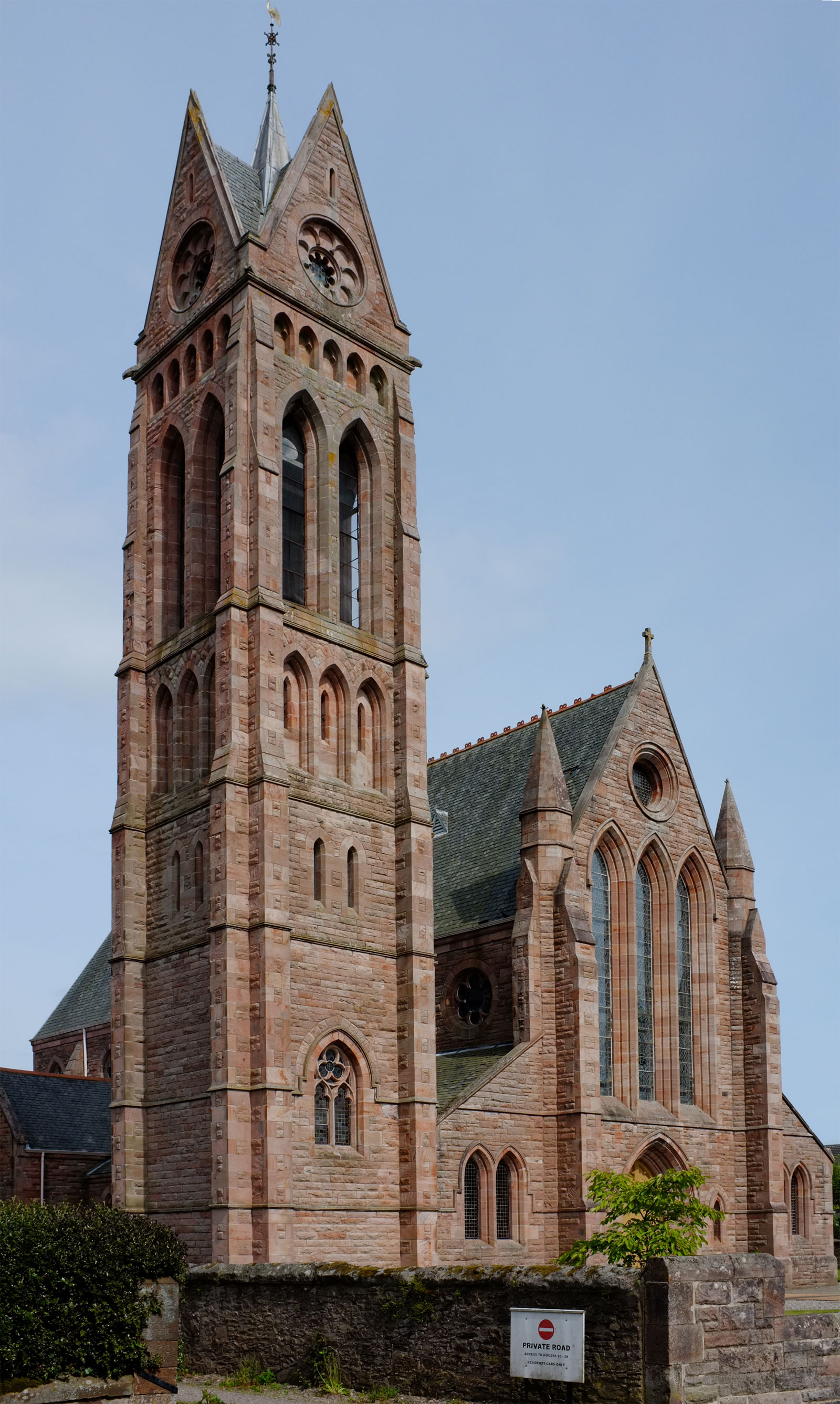
Crieff Parish Church

Crieff Parish Church (Church of Scotland) in Strathearn Terrace, also known as the East Church, is on the site of a medieval building that was demolished and rebuilt in 1786, when a hoard of gold coins from the reign of Robert the Bruce was found within its walls. The church was again rebuilt in 1827.

Crieff West Church (Church of Scotland) was built 1837–1838 on Comrie Road as a chapel of ease to the main parish church. It was converted into the St Ninian's Centre in 1958 and used for over 50 years as a lay training and conference venue until its closure in 2001. The building is now occupied by private flats.

The South Church, now disused, was built in 1881 as a Free Church of Scotland, modelled on the design of Dunblane Cathedral. It later became known as the South UP Church when it merged with the United Presbyterian Church (Scotland) into the United Free Church of Scotland, before becoming part of the established Church of Scotland.

The Scottish Episcopal Church in Perth Road is a small 1990s building which replaced an older church.

The Roman Catholic Church is represented by St Fillan's Chapel in Ford Road, as part of the Diocese of Dunkeld.

== Media ==
Radio Earn broadcasts from Strathearn and Strathallan.

== Transport ==
The town has no railway stations however it does have 2 bus routes operated by Stagecoach South Scotland. The first route is the 15 to St. Fillen or Perth and the 2nd route is the 15a to Perth or Stirling.

== Notable people ==
- Dallas Anderson (1874–1934), actor
- Moira Armstrong (born 1930), BAFTA-winning television director.
- John Craig (1896–1970), recipient of the Victoria Cross, at school in Crieff
- Daniel John Cunningham (1850–1909), anatomist and author
- Reverend John Cunningham (1819–1893) father of the above, Moderator of the General Assembly of the Church of Scotland in 1886, served as minister of Crieff Parish Church.
- Jackie Dewar (1923–2011), footballer
- Eve Graham (born 1943), former singer with New Seekers, has lived in Crieff since 2004
- David Jacks, first commercial producer of Monterey Jack cheese
- Denis Lawson (born 1947), actor
- Ewan McGregor (born 1971), actor
- Alexander Murray (1810–1884), geologist
- Neil Paterson (1915–1995), Oscar-winning screenwriter, was a resident of Crieff until his death.
- Fiona Pennie (born 1982), Olympic canoeist
- William Reid (1921–2001) recipient of the Victoria Cross, died in Crieff
- Brian Stewart (1922–2015), soldier, diplomat and spy
- Rory Stewart (born 1973), politician
- Sophie Stewart (1908–1977), actor
- Gavin Strang (born 1943), politician
- Sheila Stuart (1892–1974), children's writer, died here in 1974
- Simon Taylor (born 1979), Scottish international rugby player
- D. P. Thomson (1896–1974), evangelist of the Church of Scotland, Warden of the St Ninian's Centre
- Thomas Thomson (1773–1852), chemist
