= Aberfeldy railway station =

Railway station in Perth and Kinross, Scotland

Coordinates: 56°37′11.6″N 3°51′39.6″W

Aberfeldy

General information
- Location: Aberfeldy, Perth and Kinross; Scotland
- Platforms: 1

Other information
- Status: Disused

History
- Original company: Inverness and Perth Junction Railway
- Pre-grouping: Highland Railway
- Post-grouping: London, Midland and Scottish Railway

Key dates
- 3 July 1865: Station opens
- 3 May 1965: Station closes
Location

Aberfeldy railway station served the village of Aberfeldy in Scotland.

== History ==
The station was opened on 3 July 1865 by the Inverness and Perth Junction Railway when it opened the branch line from Ballinluig to Aberfeldy.

To the north west of the station was a goods yard and shed, with a 5 ton crane, able to take live stock, horse boxes and cattle vans. To the south of the line as it left the station was a small engine shed and turntable.

The station was host to a LMS caravan from 1935 to 1939. A camping coach was also positioned here by the Scottish Region from 1952 to 1963.

The station closed to freight and passengers on 3 May 1965.

Preceding station	Disused railways	Following station
Grandtully; Line and station closed	Highland Railway; Inverness and Perth Junction Railway	Terminus

== The site today ==
The old station is now demolished, replaced by a parking area.

== Bibliography ==
- Grant, Donald J. (2017). Directory of the Railway Companies of Great Britain (1st ed.). Kibworth Beauchamp, Leicestershire: Troubador Publishing Ltd. ISBN 978-1-78803-768-6.
- Hurst, Geoffrey (1992). Register of Closed Railways: 1948-1991. Worksop, Nottinghamshire: Milepost Publications. ISBN 0-9477-9618-5.
- McRae, Andrew (1997). British Railway Camping Coach Holidays: The 1930s & British Railways (London Midland Region). Vol. Scenes from the Past: 30 (Part One). Foxline. ISBN 1-870119-48-7.
- McRae, Andrew (1998). British Railways Camping Coach Holidays: A Tour of Britain in the 1950s and 1960s. Vol. Scenes from the Past: 30 (Part Two). Foxline. ISBN 1-870119-53-3.
- Quick, Michael (2022) [2001]. Railway passenger stations in Great Britain: a chronology (PDF). version 5.04. Railway & Canal Historical Society. Archived from the original (PDF) on 25 November 2022.
- The Railway Clearing House (1970) [1904]. The Railway Clearing House Handbook of Railway Stations 1904 (1970 D&C Reprint ed.). Newton Abbot: David & Charles Reprints. p. 461. ISBN 0-7153-5120-6.
