= Guay railway station =

Former railway station in Scotland

Guay

General information
- Location: Dunkeld, Perth and Kinross; Scotland
- Coordinates: 56.6224°N 3.6351°W
- Grid reference: NN997490
- Platforms: 1

Other information
- Status: Disused

History
- Pre-grouping: Highland Railway
- Post-grouping: London, Midland and Scottish Railway

Key dates
- 1 June 1863: Station opened
- 3 August 1959: Station closed
Location

Guay railway station, Dunkeld, Perth and Kinross, Scotland, was located near the hamlet of Guay next to the A9 road and close to the River Tay. The station stood on the old Inverness and Perth Junction Railway main line and lay 21 mi 36 chains (34.5 km) from Perth and was some 95 miles (160 km) south of Inverness.

== History ==
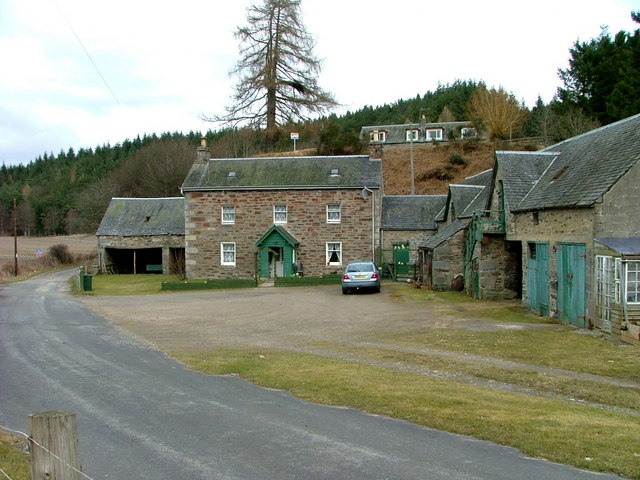
Guay Farm and the old A9

The station served the small hamlet in the parish of Dunkeld and Dowally which once had its own water mill, school and smithy. It was opened by the Inverness and Perth Junction Railway, later the Highland Railway, in 1863 and closed in 1959. The station became part of the London, Midland and Scottish Railway prior to nationalisation. Little passenger traffic would have been generated from the hamlet however goods and agricultural traffic would once have been more significant with Guay and other farms nearby.

By 1948 Guay had a very limited service with no Sunday stopping trains, one Monday only service and several that stopped only on request.

== Infrastructure ==
The station stood on a slightly curved section of single track with a platform mainly built of stone. The ticket office and waiting room was a simple rectangular wooden building, oil lamps provided lighting and a store was present together with a double sided signal of the type used to stop trains if passengers were to be uplifted. Unusually the door of the goods shed was painted white in its lower section to prevent accidental damage during shunting operations.

In 1900 the sidings ran into a goods yard, with its cattle loading dock, from the south with a signal box located overlooking the points which lead into the sidings and the goods shed. A building stood to the right of the goods yard entrance gates, a common location for a station master's house. The station was host to a LMS caravan from 1936 to 1939. A level crossing with gates still stands to the north of the station giving access to the River Tay. The track through the station is now double track.

Preceding station	Historical railways	Following station
Dalguise; Line open, station closed	Highland Railway; Inverness and Perth Junction Railway	Ballinluig; Line open, station closed
