= Dalguise Viaduct =

Bridge in Perth and Kinross, Scotland

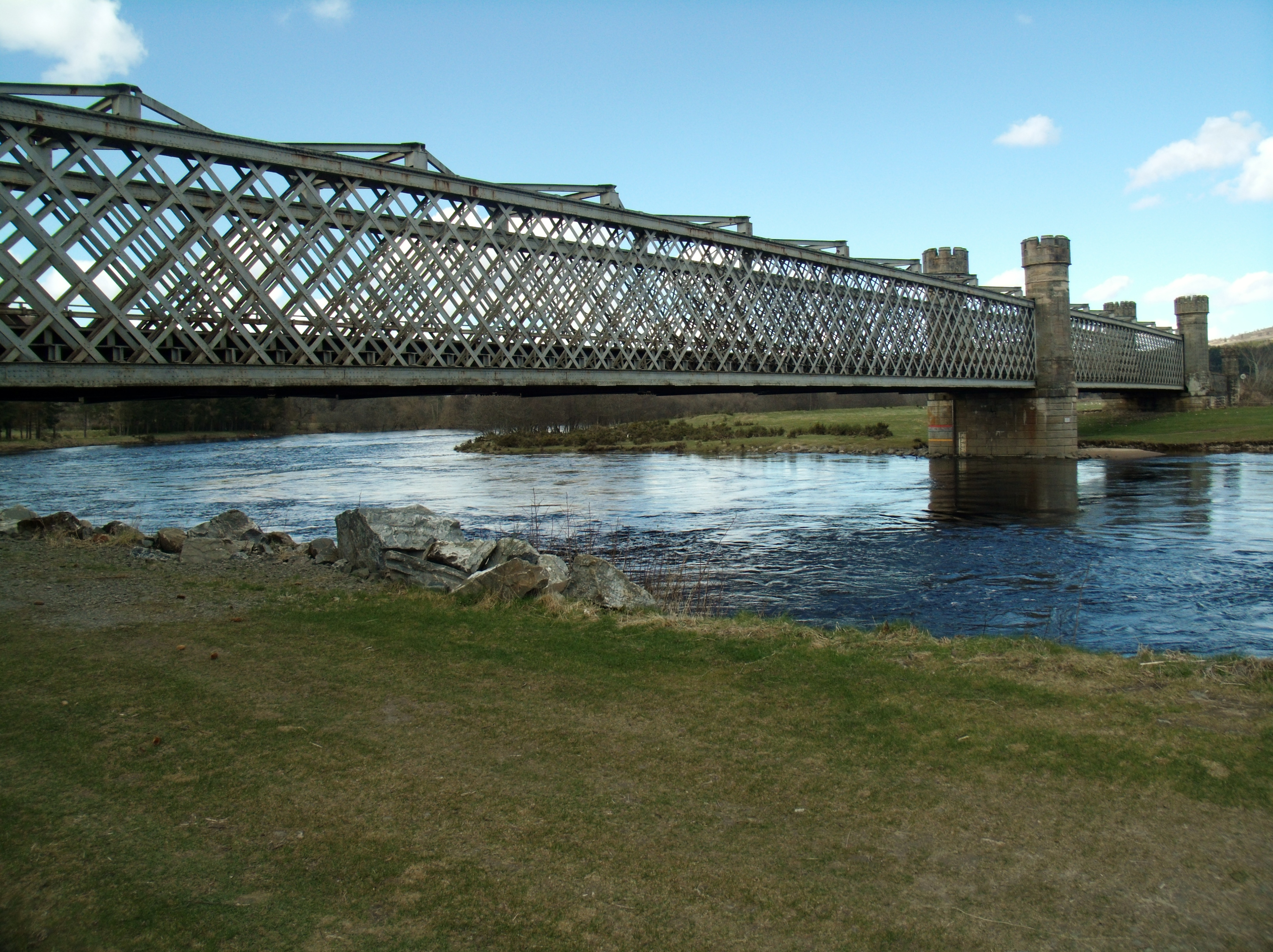
- Main span of the viaduct from the western side of the River Tay
- Coordinates: 56.61260°N 3.6390851°W
- Carries: Highland Main Line railway
- Crosses: River Tay
- Locale: Perth and Kinross
- Other name: River Tay Viaduct

Characteristics
- Design: Lattice girder
- Material: Iron

History
- Opened: 1863; 163 years ago

Listed Building – Category A
- Official name: Dalguise Railway Viaduct Over R. Tay
- Designated: 4 October 1971
- Reference no.: LB11117

Location
- Interactive map of Dalguise Viaduct

The Dalguise Viaduct is a lattice girder viaduct in Dalguise, Perth and Kinross, Scotland. It carries the Highland Main Line railway across the River Tay. Built in 1863, it was designed by Joseph Mitchell, for the then-new Inverness and Perth Junction Railway. A Category A listed structure, it stands about 0.44 miles (0.71 km) north of the now-disused Dalguise railway station, and about 6 miles (10 km) north of Dunkeld.

The viaduct has two spans; the southern one being 210 feet (64 m), the northern 141 feet (43 m). The girders are 16 ft (4.9 m) high, and 67 ft (20 m) above the bed of the river. The ironwork was supplied by Sir William Fairbairn & Sons, of Manchester. The abutments and central piers are stone, with ornamental castellations on top, to appease the Duke of Atholl.

The lattice girder design was a development of the American timber trusses patented by Ithiel Town in 1820, but constructed using wrought iron. More recently, additional diagonal bracing has been added to the top chords of the trusses, to improve lateral stability.

Similar viaducts were built by Fairbairn at Blair Atholl carrying the Highland Main Line over the River Tilt, and at Logierait over the Tay, now used as a local access road.

The bridge was listed in October 1971, and was upgraded in 1989.

Significant flooding of the River Tay caused damage to the railway embankment in 1868 and 1992. There was also flood damage at Dalguise in January 1993. The line was closed due to high water levels in December 2015. During Storm Isha in January 2024, the viaduct was again closed as river levels breached safety limits, with the Network Rail Scotland watchperson having to abandon the site.

The Dalguisie viaduct would have been familiar to author Beatrix Potter, as her father rented Dalguise House between May and September of 1871 to 1881.

== See also ==
- List of crossings of the River Tay
- List of bridges in Scotland
