= Balnaguard Halt railway station =

Disused railway station in Balnaguard, Perth and Kinross

Balnaguard Halt
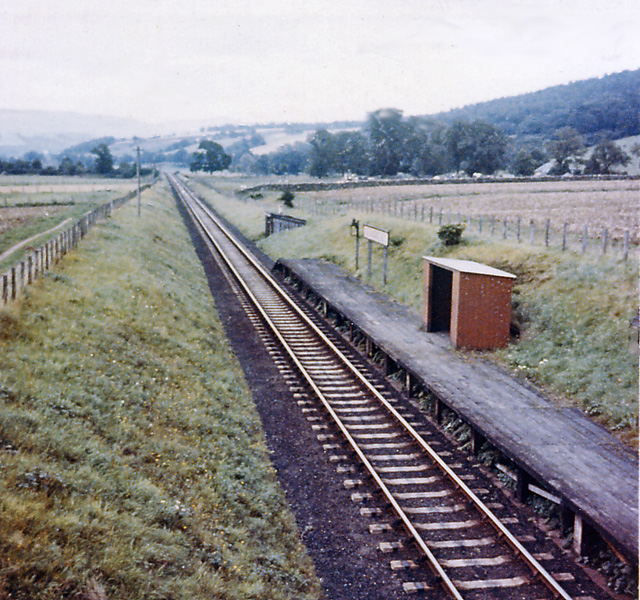
- The station in 1962

General information
- Location: Balnaguard, Perth and Kinross; Scotland
- Coordinates: 56.6483°N 3.7213°W
- Grid reference: NN945520
- Platforms: 1

Other information
- Status: Disused

History
- Post-grouping: London, Midland and Scottish Railway

Key dates
- 2 December 1935: Opened
- 3 May 1965: Closed
Location

Balnaguard Halt railway station served the hamlet of Balnaguard, Perth and Kinross, Scotland from 1935 to 1965 on the Inverness and Perth Junction Railway.

== History ==
The station opened on 2 December 1935 by the London, Midland and Scottish Railway. It closed on 3 May 1965.

Preceding station	Disused railways	Following station
Ballinluig; Line and station closed	Highland Railway; Inverness and Perth Junction Railway	Grandtully; Line and station closed
