= List of crossings of the River Tay =

== List of crossings of the River Tay ==
Category	Heritage Status Criteria
A	Buildings of national or international importance, either architectural or historic, or fine little-altered examples of some particular period, style or building type.
B	Buildings of regional or more than local importance, or major examples of some particular period, style or building type which may have been altered.
C	Buildings of local importance, lesser examples of any period, style, or building type, as originally constructed or moderately altered; and simple traditional buildings which group well with others in categories A and B.

Crossing	Date	Coordinates	Heritage status	Locality	Notes	Photo
Notable bridges upstream of Loch Tay. River goes under various different names.
Cononish Footbridge		56.4166°N 4.7506°W			River Cononish	Footbridge_over_the_River_Cononish_-_geograph.org.uk_-_4138327
Railway Bridge		56.42°N 4.7018°W		River Cononish	Oban Line	
Bridge Over River Fillan	18th Cent	56.4226°N 4.6843°W	B	Drochaid Bhan		Drochaid_Bhan_-_geograph.org.uk_-_5962033
A82 Bridge		56.4226°N 4.6775°W		River Fillan		River_Fillan_-_geograph.org.uk_-_5036517
West Highland Way Bridge		56.4162°N 4.6631°W		West Highland Way		West_Highland_Way_near_Kirkton_Farm_-_geograph.org.uk_-_4205103
Glenbruar Viaduct		56.3945°N 4.6180°W		Crianlarich	Fort William Line	Caledonian_Sleeper_crossing_Glenbruar_Viaduct_-_geograph.org.uk_-_5960862
Loch Dochart House Bridge	1825	56.413°N 4.5298°W	B			
Auchlyne Bridge	Early 19th Cent	56.4258°N 4.4262°W	B	River Dochart		Bridge_over_River_Dochart_-_geograph.org.uk_-_6119545
Bridge Of Dochart	1760	56.463°N 4.3202°W	A	Killin		Killin,_bridge_over_the_Dochart_-_geograph.org.uk_-_4049084
Railway Viaduct	1885	56.4653°N 4.3155°W	A	Killin	Killin Branch	Old_Railway_Bridge_over_the_River_Dochart_-_geograph.org.uk_-_880535
Bridge at Badour		56.4802°N 4.548°W		River Lochay		Bridge_at_Badour_-_geograph.org.uk_-_1281813
Glen Lochay Road Bridge		56.4831°N 4.3642°W		River Lochay		Bridge_over_the_River_Lochay_-_geograph.org.uk_-_745433
Bridge Of Lochay	18th Cent	56.4784°N 4.3239°W	B	Killin		Bridge_of_Lochay,_Killin_-_geograph.org.uk_-_6084189
Railway Bridge, River Lochay		56.4714°N 4.3146°W		Killin	Killin Branch	Old_railway_bridge,_Killin_-_geograph.org.uk_-_915556
Loch Tay	Loch_Tay_-_geograph.org.uk_-_2567647					
Kenmore Bridge	1774	56.5858°N 4.0018°W	A	Kenmore		Tay_Bridge,_Kenmore_(2)_-_geograph.org.uk_-_4357499
Chinese Bridge, Taymouth Castle	Early 19th cent	56.5967°N 3.9846°W	A	Kenmore		Chinese_Bridge,_Taymouth_Castle_(geograph_2025598)
Newhall Bridge, Taymouth Castle	1842	56.5985°N 3.9736°W	B	Kenmore		
Wade's Bridge	1733	56.6214°N 3.8737°W	A	Aberfeldy		Tay_Bridge,_Aberfeldy_-_geograph.org.uk_-_2025606
Aberfeldy Footbridge		56.6254°N 3.8705°W	-	Aberfeldy		The_Plastic_Footbridge,_Aberfeldy,_Scotland_-_geograph.org.uk_-_5924401
Grandtully Bridge		56.6585°N 3.776°W	-	Grandtully		Grandtully_Bridge_^_the_R_Tay_-_geograph.org.uk_-_5612634
Pitnacree Bridge		56.6589°N 3.7547°W	-	Grandtully	A827	Pitnacree_Bridge_over_River_Tay_-_geograph.org.uk_-_1229107
Logierait Viaduct	1865	56.6468°N 3.6835°W	A	Ballinluig	Aberfeldy Branch Line, now private road	Logierait_Bridge_(Geograph_1009548_by_Russel_Wills)
Dalguise Viaduct	1863	56.6126°N 3.639°W	A	Dunkeld	Highland Main Line	Dalguise_viaduct_(geograph_3418380)
Jubilee Bridge	1977	56.5758°N 3.6218°W	-	Dunkeld	A9	A9 Bridge across the River Tay (geograph 6370881)
Dunkeld Bridge	1809	56.5639°N 3.5853°W	A	Dunkeld		Dunkeld_Bridge_-_geograph.org.uk_-_1202125
Caputh Bridge		56.5387°N 3.4828°W	-	Caputh		Caputh_Bridge_-_geograph.org.uk_-_94994
Kinclaven Bridge	1905	56.5267°N 3.3682°W	B	Meikleour		Kinclaven_Bridge_(geograph_7011614)
Cargill Viaduct		56.5188°N 3.3839°W	-	Cargill	Scottish Midland Junction Railway	Cargill Viaduct (geograph 7641937)
Destiny Bridge	2025	56.4325°N 3.469°W	-	Perth		Destiny Bridge Across the River Tay (geograph 7920992)
Perth Bridge	1771	56.399°N 3.4255°W	A	Perth		Perth_-_Bridge_over_River_Tay
Queen's Bridge, Perth	1960	56.3949°N 3.4246°W	-	Perth		Rippling_reflections_in_the_Tay_-_geograph.org.uk_-_1926549
Perth Railway Bridge		56.3922°N 3.4249°W	-	Perth		Perth_Railway_Bridge_-_geograph.org.uk_-_2673985
Friarton Bridge	1978	56.3791°N 3.4092°W	-	Perth	M90	Friarton_Bridge,_Perth_-_geograph.org.uk_-_3518507
Tay Rail Bridge	1887	56.4367°N 2.9874°W	A	Dundee		Tay_Bridge_crossing_the_Firth_of_Tay_-_geograph.org.uk_-_5996568
Tay Road Bridge	1966	56.4535°N 2.9493°W	-	Dundee		Tay_Road_Bridge_-_geograph.org.uk_-_2825755
