= Grandtully railway station =

Disused railway station in Grandtully, Perthshire

Grandtully
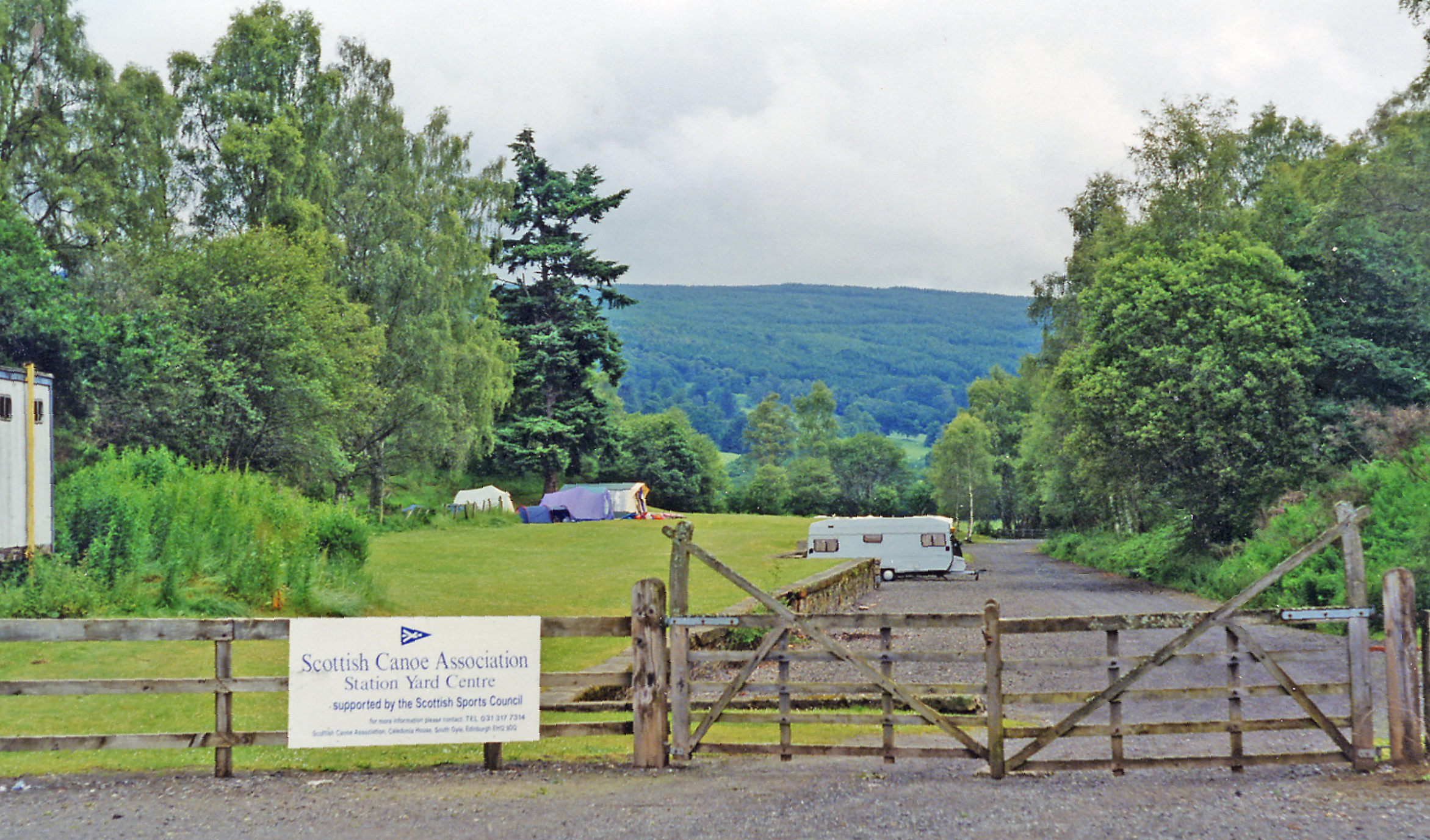
- The site of the station in 1997

General information
- Location: Grandtully, Perthshire; Scotland
- Coordinates: 56.6564°N 3.7740°W
- Grid reference: NN913530
- Platforms: 1

Other information
- Status: Disused

History
- Original company: Inverness and Perth Junction Railway
- Pre-grouping: Highland Railway
- Post-grouping: London, Midland and Scottish Railway

Key dates
- 3 July 1865: Opened
- 3 May 1965: Closed
Location

Grandtully railway station served the village of Grandtully, Perthshire, Scotland, from 1865 to 1965 on the Inverness and Perth Junction Railway.

== History ==
The station first opened on 1 July 1865 by the Inverness and Perth Junction Railway but only a few trains ran in the evening. The full service was introduced two days later, on 3 July. It closed to both passengers and goods traffic on 3 May 1965.

Preceding station	Disused railways	Following station
Balnaguard Halt; Line and station closed	Highland Railway; Inverness and Perth Junction Railway	Aberfeldy; Line and station closed
