= Alexandre Lavalley =

Alexandre-Théodore Lavalley
- Born: October 9, 1821; Pregny-Chambésy
- Died: July 20, 1892 (aged 70); Château de Bois-Tillard near Pont-l'Évêque, French Third Republic
- Citizenship: France
- Education: École Polytechnique
- Occupations: Engineer, politician
- Known for: Suez Canal
- Works: Ormaiztegi Viaduct
- Awards: Officer of the Legion of Honour

Alexandre-Théodore Lavalley, (October 9, 1821 – July 20, 1892) was an engineer and French politician. Paul Borel and Lavalley were contractors of the Suez Canal Company who designed, built, and operated the dredging machines that finished excavation of the Suez Canal from 1864 to 1869 after the use of forced labor was disallowed.

== Biography ==
=== Education ===
Alexandre Lavalley finished his preparatory studies in Tours, entered the École Polytechnique and left after studying military engineering in 1842. He resigned his commission and spent a few years in England, where he became a mechanic and acquired practical knowledge about machinery.

=== Engineering career ===
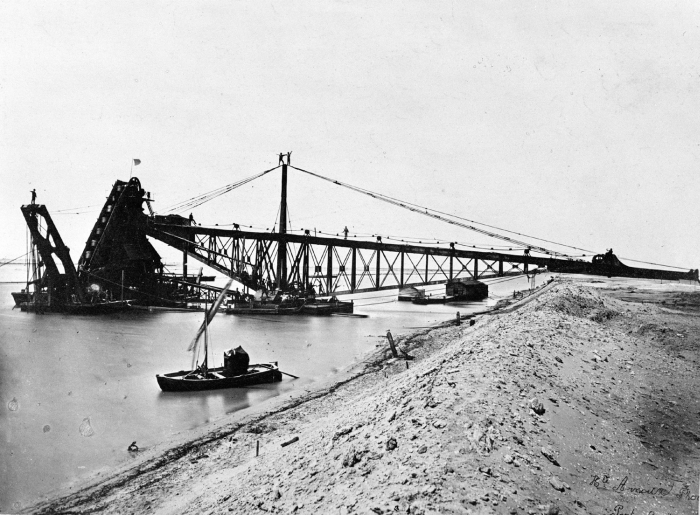
Photo of a dredge machine taken circa 1870

Upon returning to France, he joined Ernest Goüin & Cie, a company that built locomotives, where he was trusted to manage the locomotive plants. He also designed lighthouses on the Black Sea, created a tunnel boring machine in Lithuania, and created a machine to dredge ports in Russia. Paul Borel and Lavalley were hired as subcontractors by the Suez Canal Company to finish the excavation of the Suez Canal. They were responsible for the design, construction, and operation of the dredging machines that finished the excavation from 1864 to 1869 after the use of corvee labor was disallowed by the Ottoman administrator of Egypt, Ismail. In 1876, he obtained a concession to work on the port of Pointe des Galets in Réunion and to build a railroad linking the port to the interior of the island.

In 1881, the British railway entrepreneur Sir Edward Watkin and Lavalley were in the Anglo-French Submarine Railway Company that conducted exploratory work on both sides of the English Channel. On the English side a 2.13-metre (7 ft) diameter Beaumont-English boring machine dug a 1,893-metre (6,211 ft) pilot tunnel from Shakespeare Cliff. On the French side, a similar machine dug 1,669 m (5,476 ft) from Sangatte. The project was abandoned in May 1882, owing to British political and press campaigns asserting that a tunnel would compromise Britain's national defences. These early works were encountered more than a century later during the TML project.

=== Politician ===
Lavalley was elected on January 25, 1885, as a Senator representing Calvados. He sat in the left of the Senate, but voted with the majority for the new military law and for the colonial policies. He was absent during the vote for the breakup of the French Crown Jewels. Finally, Lavalley voted for the reestablishment of district elections (February 13, 1889), for a draft of the Lisbonne Law that would have restricted the freedom of the press, and against the procedure of the Senate against the general Georges Ernest Boulanger.

== Sources ==
- "Alexandre Lavalley", in Adolphe Robert and Gaston Cougny, Dictionnaire des parlementaires français (1789–1891), Bourloton, Paris, 1889 Edition details Wikisource
