= Dalguise railway station =

Disused railway station in Dalguise, Perth and Kinross

Dalguise
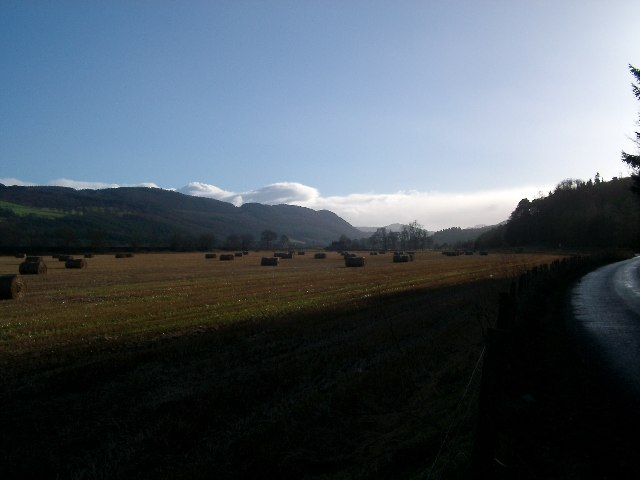
- The station building, now converted into a house, is just visible in the background of this 2003 photograph

General information
- Location: Dalguise, Perth and Kinross; Scotland
- Coordinates: 56.606°N 3.6391°W
- Grid reference: NN994472
- Platforms: 2

Other information
- Status: Disused

History
- Original company: Inverness and Perth Junction Railway
- Pre-grouping: Highland Railway
- Post-grouping: London, Midland and Scottish Railway

Key dates
- 1 June 1863: Opened
- 3 May 1965: Closed
Location

Dalguise railway station served the Scottish settlement of Dalguise, Perth and Kinross, from 1863 to 1965 on the Inverness and Perth Junction Railway.

== History ==
The station opened on 1 June 1863 by the Inverness and Perth Junction Railway. The station closed to both passengers and goods traffic on 3 May 1965.

Preceding station	Historical railways	Following station
Dunkeld & Birnam; Line and station open	Highland Railway; Inverness and Perth Junction Railway	Guay; Line open, station closed
