= Ormaiztegi =

- Municipality
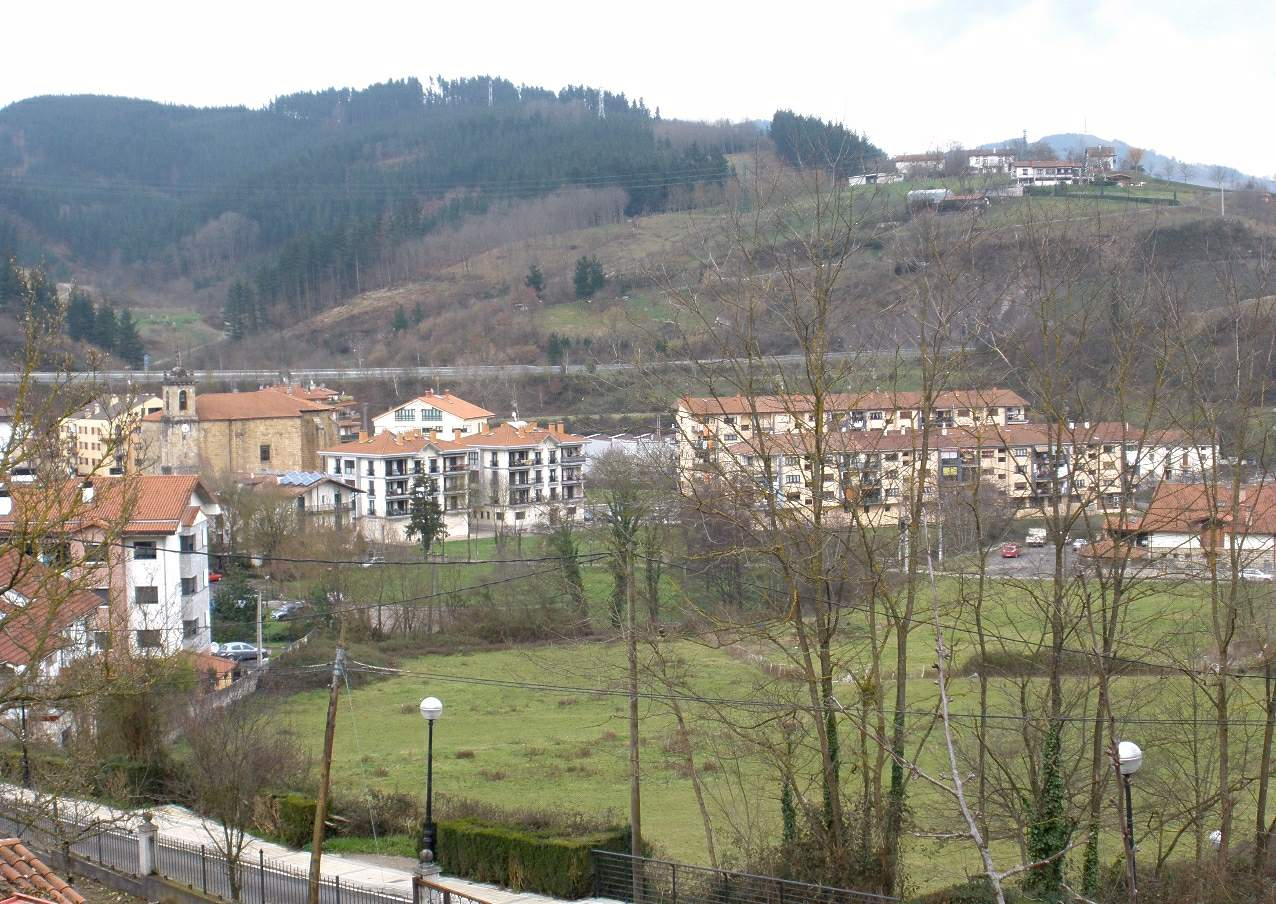

- Coat of arms

- Location in Basque Country Location in Spain
- Coordinates: 43°2′35″N 2°15′18″W
- Country: Spain
- Autonomous community: Basque Country
- Province: Gipuzkoa
- Eskualdea: Goierri

Government
  - Mayor: Jon Miren Intxausti Ugalde

Area
  - Total: 6.77 km^{2} (2.61 sq mi)
- Elevation: 200 m (660 ft)

Population (2025-01-01)
  - Total: 1,293
  - Density: 191/km^{2} (495/sq mi)
- Demonym: Ormaiztegiar
- Time zone: UTC+1 (CET)
  - Summer (DST): UTC+2 (CEST)
- Postal code: 20216
- Official language(s): Basque, Spanish
- Website: Official website

Ormaiztegi is a town and municipality located in the comarca of Goierri, Gipuzkoa province, in the autonomous community of the Basque Country, northern Spain. It is also the location of the Ormaiztegi Viaduct, nowadays a historical monument. It is the birthplace of the Carlist hero General Tomas Zumalacarregui.

It also has Irizar's main factory.
