= Lattice girder =

Truss girder where the load is carried by a web of latticed metal

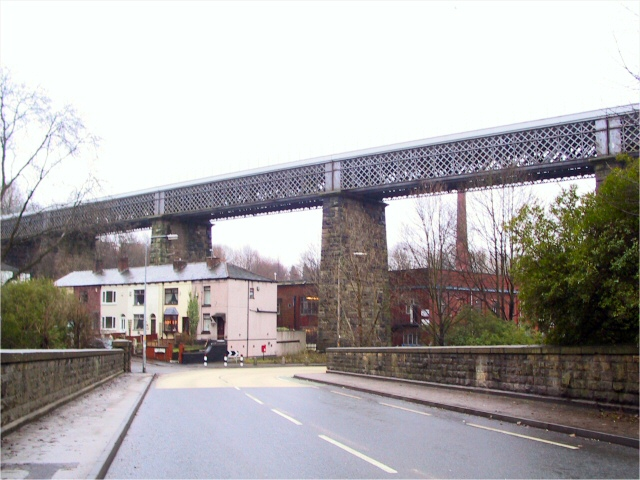
Darcy Lever lattice girder railway bridge, Lancashire, England.

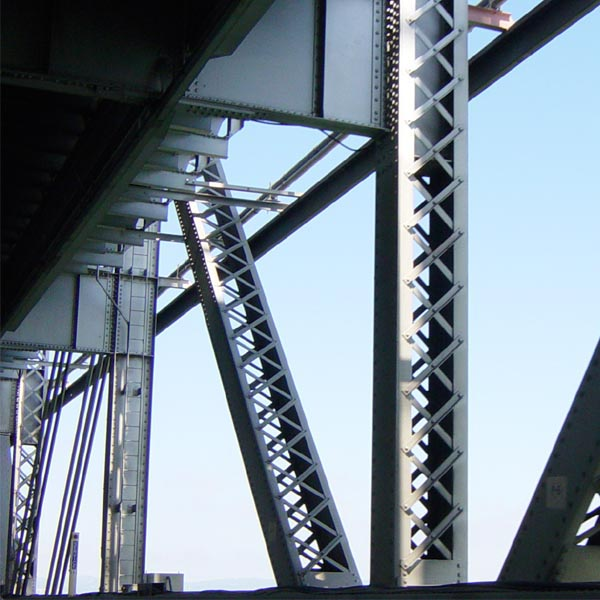
Laced vertical struts and diagonal ties on the cantilever portion of the now-demolished eastern span of the San Francisco–Oakland Bay Bridge)

A lattice girder is a truss girder where the load is carried by a web of latticed metal.

== Overview ==
The lattice girder was used prior to the development of larger rolled steel plates. It has been supplanted in modern construction with welded or bolted plate girders, which use more material but have lower fabrication and maintenance costs.

The term is also sometimes used to refer to a laced strut or laced tie, structural members commonly made using a combination of structural sections connected with diagonal lacing. This form allows a strut to resist axial compression and a (tie) to resist axial tension. A lattice girder, like any girder, primarily resists bending.

The component sections may typically include metal beams, channel and angle sections, with the lacing elements either metal plate strips, or angle sections. The lacing elements are typically attached using either hot rivets or threaded locator bolts. As with lattice girders, laced struts and ties have generally been supplanted by hollow box sections, which are more economic to produce with modern technology. In some case seismic retrofit modifications replace riveted lacing with plates bolted in place.

== Examples of lattice girders ==
- Manhattan Bridge
- Runcorn Railway Bridge
- Kew Railway Bridge
- Dowery Dell Viaduct
- Bennerley Viaduct
- Cayey Bridge
- Dalguise Viaduct
- Ormaiztegi Viaduct

== Examples of laced struts or ties ==
- The Eiffel Tower.
- The obsolescent eastern span of the San Francisco–Oakland Bay Bridge. The western span has been retrofitted with bolted plates replacing the lacing for added strength. The eastern span has been replaced.
- The internal structure of the Statue of Liberty.
- The sides of the Cape Fear Memorial Bridge.
- Certain viaducts of the Chicago "L" system.

== See also ==
- Hares Hill Road Bridge
- Lattice truss bridge – an extension of the concept to form a deep truss
