= Ballinluig railway station =

Disused railway station in Ballinluig, Perth and Kinross

Ballinluig
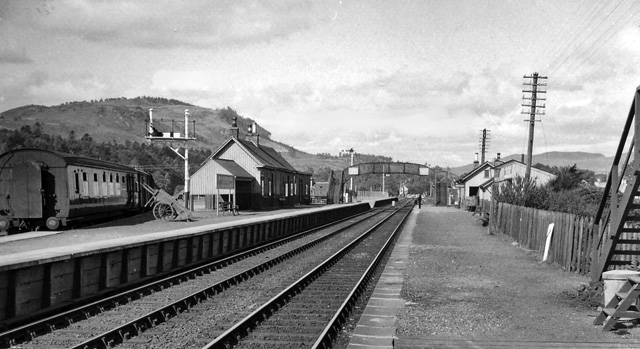
- The station in 1962

General information
- Location: Ballinluig, Perth and Kinross; Scotland
- Coordinates: 56.649°N 3.6656°W
- Grid reference: NN979520
- Platforms: 2

Other information
- Status: Disused

History
- Original company: Inverness and Perth Junction Railway
- Pre-grouping: Highland Railway
- Post-grouping: London, Midland and Scottish Railway

Key dates
- 1 June 1863: Opened
- 3 May 1965: Closed
Location

Ballinluig railway station served the village of Ballinluig, Perth and Kinross, Scotland from 1863 to 1965 on the Inverness and Perth Junction Railway.

== History ==
The station was opened on 1 June 1863 by the Inverness and Perth Junction Railway. The station closed to both passengers and good traffic on 3 May 1965.

Preceding station	Historical railways	Following station
Guay; Line open, station closed	Highland Railway; Inverness and Perth Junction Railway	Balnaguard Halt; Line and station closed
Guay; Line open, station closed	Highland Railway; Inverness and Perth Junction Railway	Pitlochry; Line and station open
