= Ormaiztegi Viaduct =

Railway bridge in Gipuzkoa, Spain

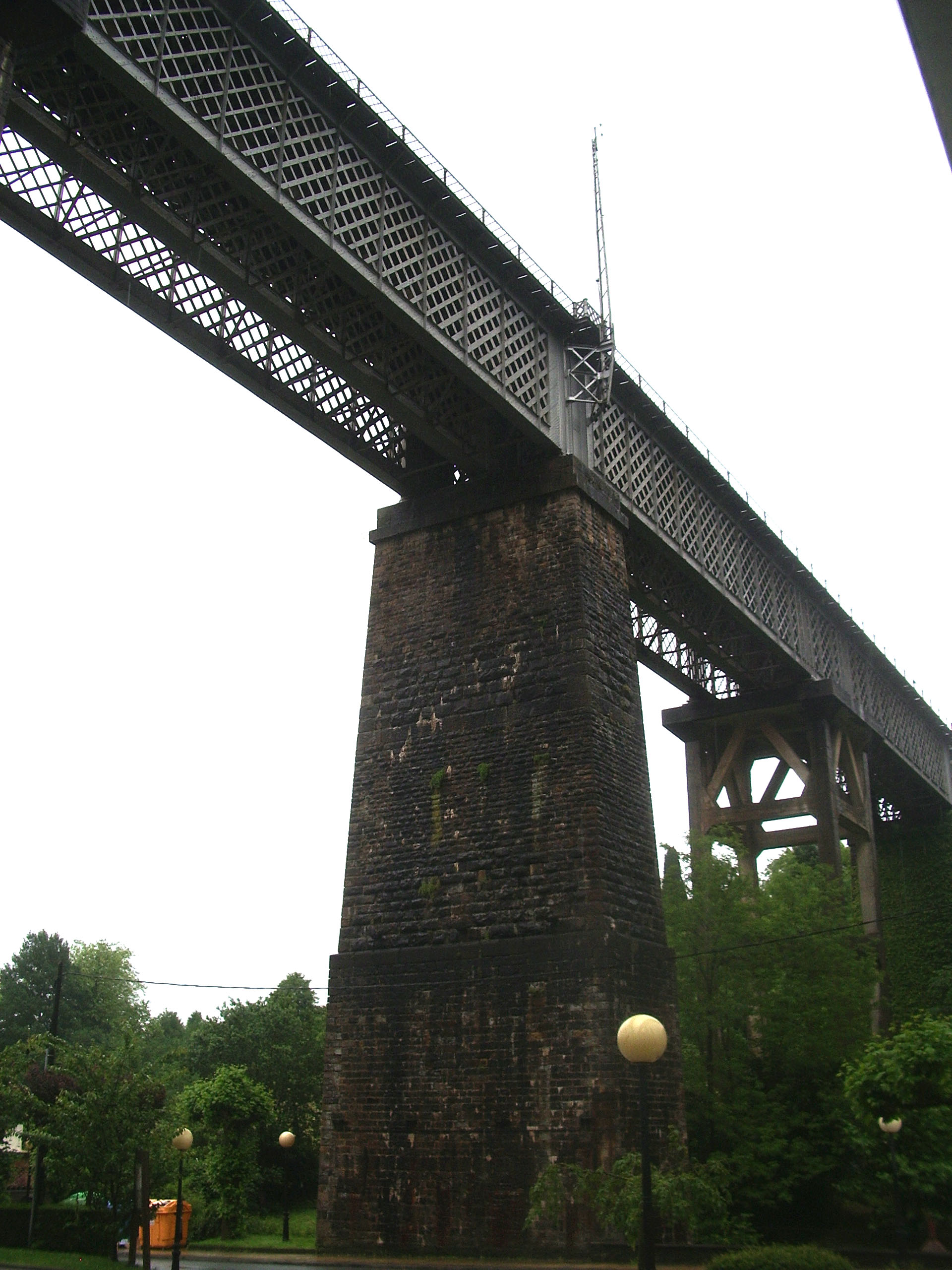
- Coordinates: 43°02′33.07″N 02°15′32.86″W
- Locale: Ormaiztegi, Gipuzkoa, Basque Country, Spain

Characteristics
- Design: Multiple-span Deck truss bridge, Lattice girder, viaduct, bridge
- Material: Wrought iron
- Total length: 291.5 m (956 ft)
- Height: 35 m (115 ft)
- No. of spans: 53.2 m (175 ft), 3×60.5 m (198 ft), 53.2 m (175 ft)
- Design life: 155 years

History
- Designer: Alexandre Lavalley
- Constructed by: Société de construction des Batignolles
- Construction end: 1863
- Inaugurated: 1864

Location
- Interactive map of Ormaiztegi Viaduct

The Ormaiztegi Viaduct (Basque: Ormaiztegiko zubibidea, Spanish: Viaducto de Ormaiztegi) is a lattice girder viaduct in Ormaiztegi, Spain that was formerly used by a railroad to link a line from Madrid to Irun. It is now considered a historical monument.

== History ==
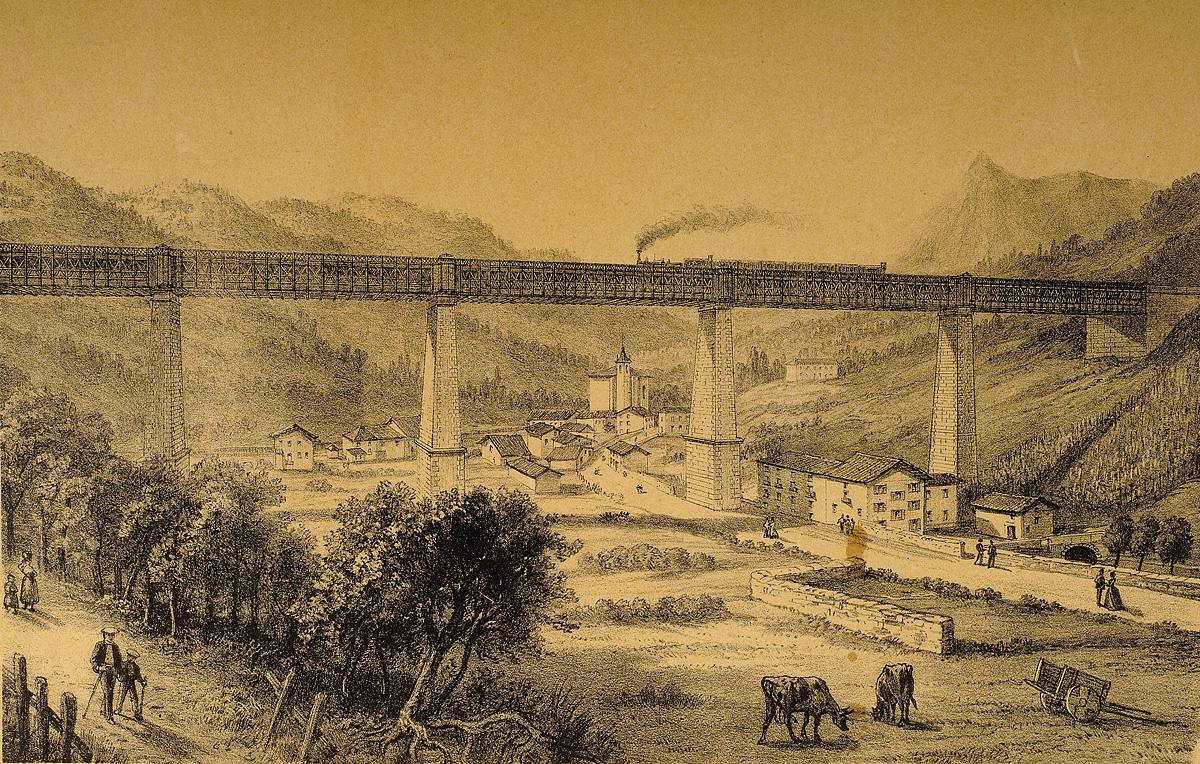
An engraving of the original viaduct.

The viaduct was designed by French engineer Alexandre Lavalley, and construction was completed in 1863.

The viaduct was destroyed during the Spanish Civil War and was reconstructed in 1940.

In 1996, it ceased to be used and was considered obsolete. A modern viaduct was built nearby. To prevent its demolition, it was declared a historical monument, since after more than 130 years, it has been considered a symbol of Ormaiztegi.

== Structure ==
The viaduct has a length of 291.5 metres (956 ft) and a height of 35 metres (115 ft) at its highest point. It was organized as a large continuous box girder structured into five spans, measuring 53.2 meters at the ends and 60.5 meters at the center.
