= Joseph Mitchell (engineer) =

Scottish civil engineer

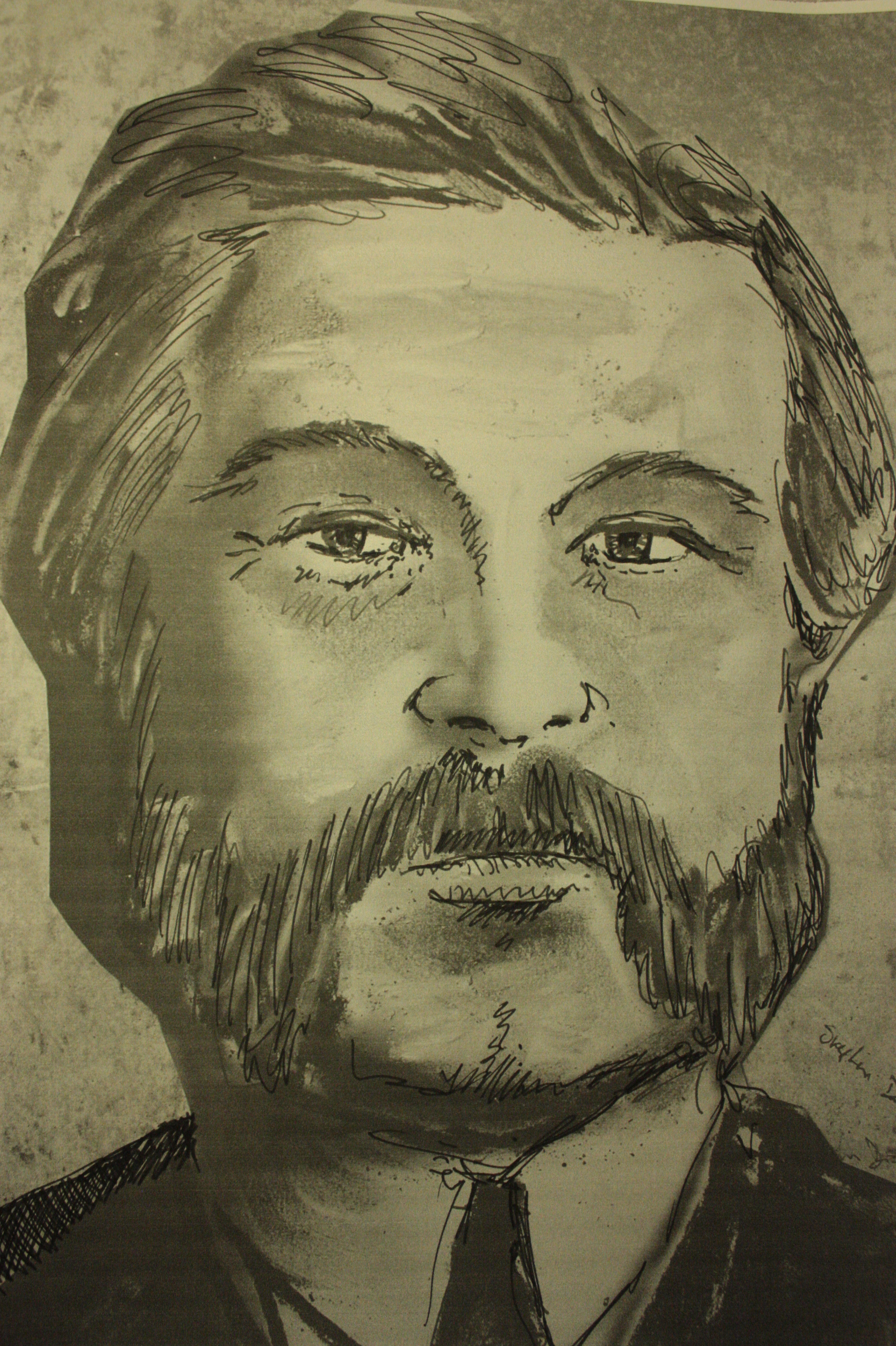
Joseph Mitchell CE

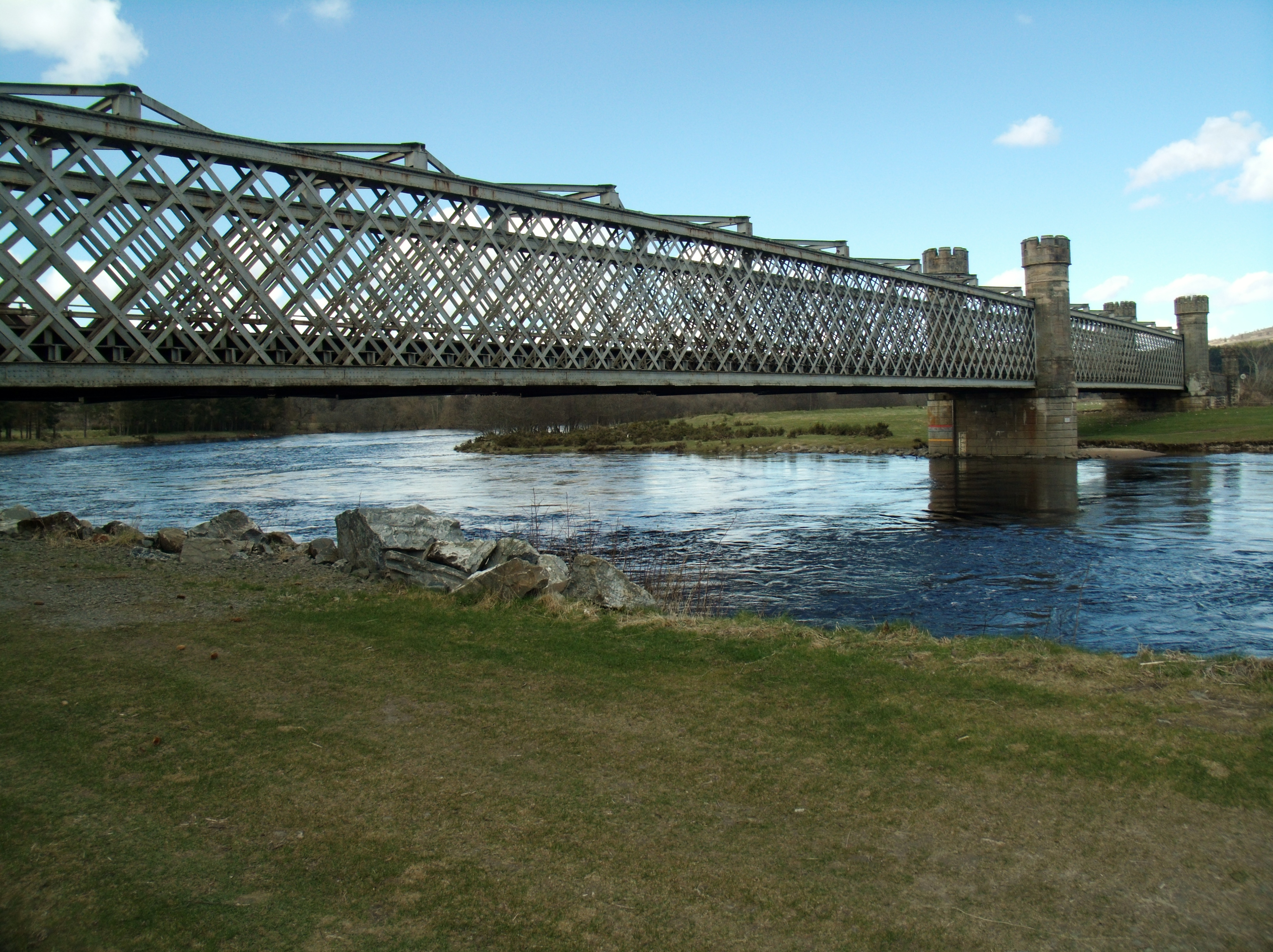
The Dalguise Viaduct was the work of Mitchell

Joseph Mitchell FRSE FGS MWS MICE (1803 – 26 November 1883) was a Scottish civil engineer.

== Life ==
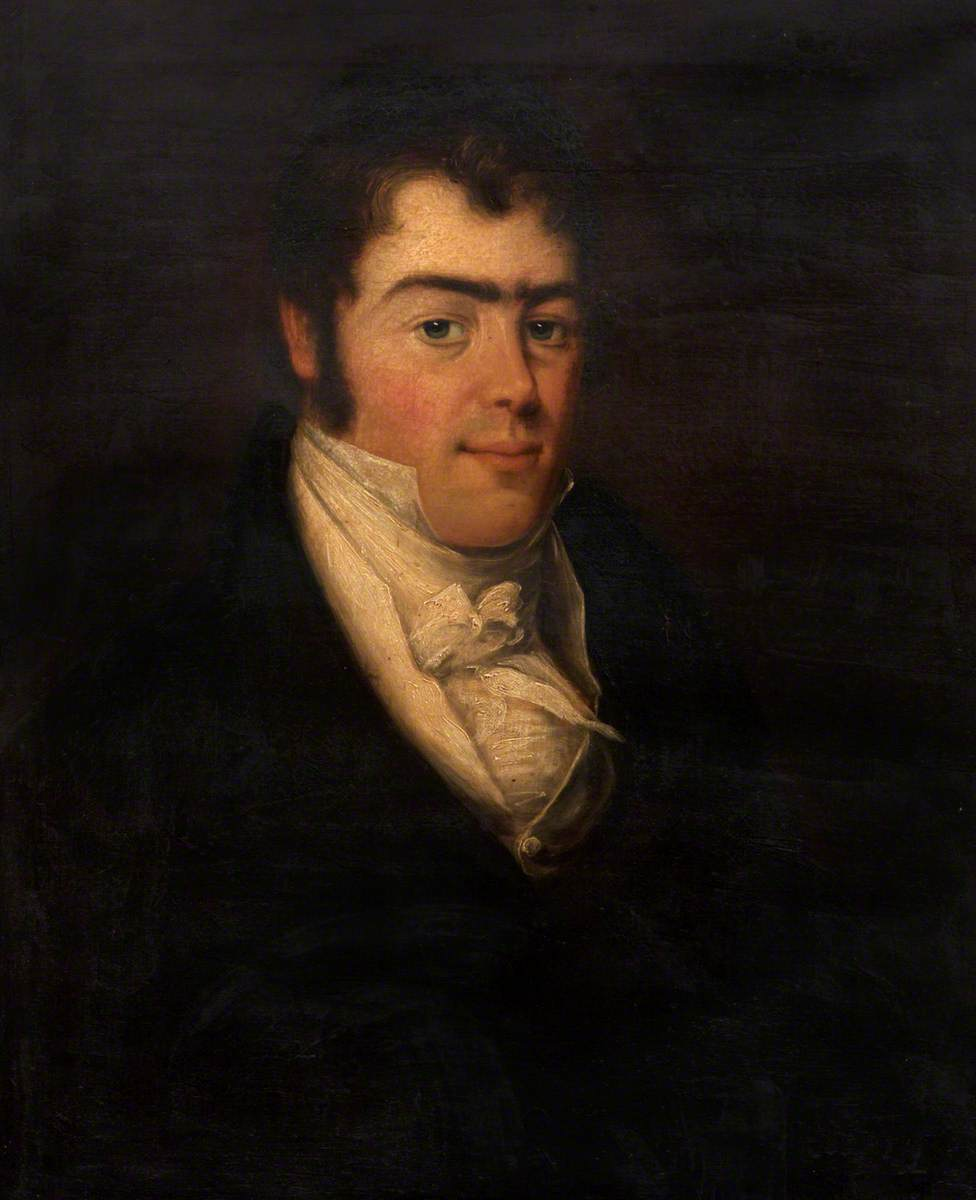
Joseph Mitchell

Joseph Mitchell was born on 3 November 1803 in Forres, the son of John Mitchell, a civil engineer.

The family moved to Inverness in 1810 where Mitchell attended Inverness Royal Academy. He continued his studies in Aberdeen. In 1820 he went to work on the construction of the Caledonian Canal under an apprenticeship to Thomas Telford.

From 1824 until his retirement in 1867 Mitchell held the post of Inspector of Highland Roads and Bridges. From 1828 he also acted as engineer for the Scottish Fisheries Board. He carried out surveys for the railways and was involved in the construction of much of the rail network in the Highlands, including the Inverness and Perth Junction Railway. In 1843 he was elected a Fellow of the Royal Society of Edinburgh, his proposer being Thomas Charles Hope.

From 1862 to 1867 he went into partnership with the engineers, William & Murdoch Paterson.

Ross write the following description of Mitchell's early life:

Land routes from north, south, east and west converged on Inverness, and its harbour provided for coastal and foreign trade.

This small metropolis harboured both civic pride and entrepreneurial spirit. Its sense of isolation had been somewhat lessened by the work of the Commissioners for Highland Roads and Bridges during the earlier decades of the nineteenth century.

They had built the Caledonian Canal, linking the three lochs of the Great Glen with the sea at each end. Old Highland footpaths, and the narrow military roads built by General Wade after 1715, had been replaced by wider roads and more substantial bridges. Around 875 miles of road were constructed, and over 1,300 bridges, mostly small but including many which spanned the larger rivers. As a result of this activity, the people of Inverness and its environs were well used to the presence of engineers, and a new career was opened to young men who previously might have passed their lives as labourers, or joined the army, or emigrated. One such was John Mitchell, born in Forres, and trained as a stonemason, whose diligence attracted the favourable notice of Thomas Telford, supremo of all the works. Mitchell was appointed as chief superintendent of all the Highland Roads in 1806. His eldest son, Joseph, was also born in Forres, in 1803. He attended Inverness Academy, which had been founded in 1791 and a flourishing school. Showing some aptitude for technical drawing, he was sent to Aberdeen for a year's tuition in drawing and architecture. It became clear that engineering would be his profession and, at the age of seventeen, he was employed as a trainee mason at the canal works then under way at Fort Augustus, on the south end of Loch Ness. As the son of John Mitchell, he was already on a fast career track, and from here he was taken to London by Telford, who liked the idea of a couple of 'raw Scotchmen' to act as his clerks and learn engineering at his house-cum-office. Joseph's years with Telford in London taught him a lot about dealing with officialdom, the rich and the nobility, as well as about engineering.

In 1824, John Mitchell died, and Telford thought sufficiently well of Joseph to secure his appointment, aged only twenty-one, as his father's replacement. Over the next twenty years, Joseph Mitchell acquired an unparalleled knowledge of the Highlands and Islands, as an engineer planning, contracting, supervising and consulting on virtually every work of significance from new paving in the streets of Inverness, and the setting-up of the town's gasworks, to laying out roads and building piers in the Orkneys. By 1844 he was a prominent and highly respected member of the Inverness community, a director and co-founder of the Caledonian Bank, and involved in many aspects of life in the town and the countryside beyond. Mitchell was something of a glutton for work and rarely refused any offer of supplementary employment. James Hope, W.S., the Edinburgh-based Law Agent was to the Commissioners for Highland Roads, first got him to apply his professional talents to railway construction in 1837.Well beyond the Highlands, he surveyed an alternative route for the Edinburgh Glasgow Railway through the Earl of Hopetoun's grounds.

From then on, Mitchell maintained an interest in railways, and noted in 1841 that the government had instructed Sir John McNeil to survey and lay out the main lines of railway in Ireland. He felt that the same thing could be done in Scotland through the already-existing agency of the Commissioners for Roads and Bridges. At Mitchell's urging, the provost and Town Council of Inverness made a proposal on these lines to the Treasury, and encouraged other town councils to do the same, but nothing came of it. Official guilt about the Highlands had not yet set in. The Railway Times commented:' These hill-people have been too long accustomed to draw on the public Treasury for the expenses of all their local improvements. Steamboats had been operating on the Caledonian Canal from as early as 1820, and between Inverness and Glasgow from 1822. Mitchell saw that steam railways would come to his part of the country sooner or later, and was determined to be the man who would make it happen.

In 1841 he made a proposal to a dynamic solicitor of Elgin, James Grant (later provost of the town), to build a railway linking it with the harbour of Lossiemouth, six miles away. Mitchell would undertake the engineering, and Grant would organise the company. Mitchell carried out a survey, and had a contractor ready, but he recorded that, 'although Mr Grant held meetings, and made considerable efforts at the time, the public did not seem then to appreciate the advantages of the proposed scheme. Mitchells next railway venture was to propose the building of the Scottish Central Railway, to link Perth to the Edinburgh and Glasgow Railway, at Larbert. This would seem to be outside his Highland stamping ground, but it is likely that he was already thinking of securing the southern basis of a route into the Highlands. He noted of the project that, 'It would bring Perth and the whole north in direct railway communication with Edinburgh and Glasgow'.' Its prospectus was issued on 30 March 1844. On 14 August of the same year, a public meeting was held in Inverness, noted as the first meeting 'for the promotion of railway enterprise in the northern counties'.· Mitchell surveyed the Scottish Central line for its promoters at his own cost, on condition of being appointed engineer, but here he ran into the sharp and heavy end of railway politics.

Mitchell was the author of several books including Reminiscences of my Life in the Highlands. He died at his London home on 26 November 1883. In the same year his son, Mitford Mitchell, presented a marble bust of Joseph Mitchell, created by Alexander Munro, to Inverness Town Hall.

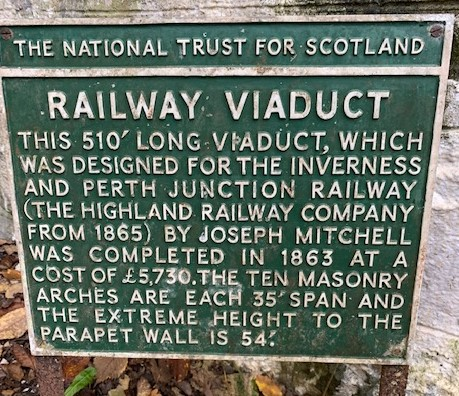
Information plaque at the Killiecrankie viaduct designed by Mitchell.

In recent years Mitchell's home in Inverness, Viewhill House, at the top of Castle Street, was used as a youth hostel. In October 2007, after lying empty for some time, it was severely damaged by fire.

== Family ==
He was the father of Very Rev James Robert Mitford Mitchell Moderator of the General Assembly of the Church of Scotland in 1907.
