= Dalguise =

Coordinates: 56.609379°N 3.645429°W

Dalguise: Scottish Gaelic: Dàil Ghiuthais
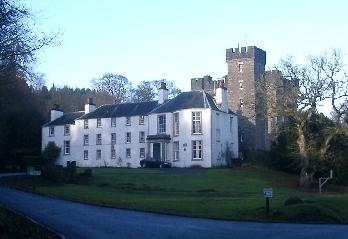
- Dalguise House

- Location within Perth and Kinross
- OS grid reference: NN991476
- Council area: Perth and Kinross
- Lieutenancy area: Perth and Kinross
- Country: Scotland
- Sovereign state: United Kingdom
- Post town: DUNKELD
- Postcode district: PH8
- Dialling code: 01350
- Police: Scotland
- Fire: Scottish
- Ambulance: Scottish
- UK Parliament: Perth and North Perthshire
- Scottish Parliament: Perthshire North

Dalguise (Scottish Gaelic Dàil Ghiuthais) is a settlement in Perth and Kinross, Scotland. It is situated on the western side of the River Tay on the B898 road, 5 miles (8 kilometres) north of Dunkeld. Located there is Dalguise House, a place where, from the age of four, Beatrix Potter stayed annually with her family throughout the summer, from May till the end of the salmon season.

== History ==
=== Dalguise House ===
Plans to build a house in Dalguise were completed in 1714, and building was completed in 1753. Extensions to the property were built in 1791, 1812 and 1821.

Beatrix Potter stayed at Dalguise House with her family during the early 1890s. Whilst staying at Dalguise in 1893, Potter wrote picture letters which provided the basis for her first book, The Tale of Peter Rabbit, and the book The Tale of Jeremy Fisher. The latter was influenced by her exploration of the River Tay. The Tale of Mrs Tiggy Winkle, published in 1905, was also inspired by the Potters' old washer woman at Dalguise, Kitty MacDonald.

Dalguise House was purchased in 1992 by PGL, becoming an outdoor education centre.

== Notable features ==
Dalguise has a village hall, which has been used for activities such as meditation and country dancing.

A 1.25-mile section of the River Tay within Dalguise is owned by Dalguise Fishings, providing an area for salmon fishing. A fishing hut is also situated on the river.

== Transport ==
Dalguise railway station closed to passengers in 1965. The number 60 bus between Aberfeldy and Blairgowrie, operated by Stagecoach South Scotland, stops at Dalguise once a day on schooldays.

== Gallery ==
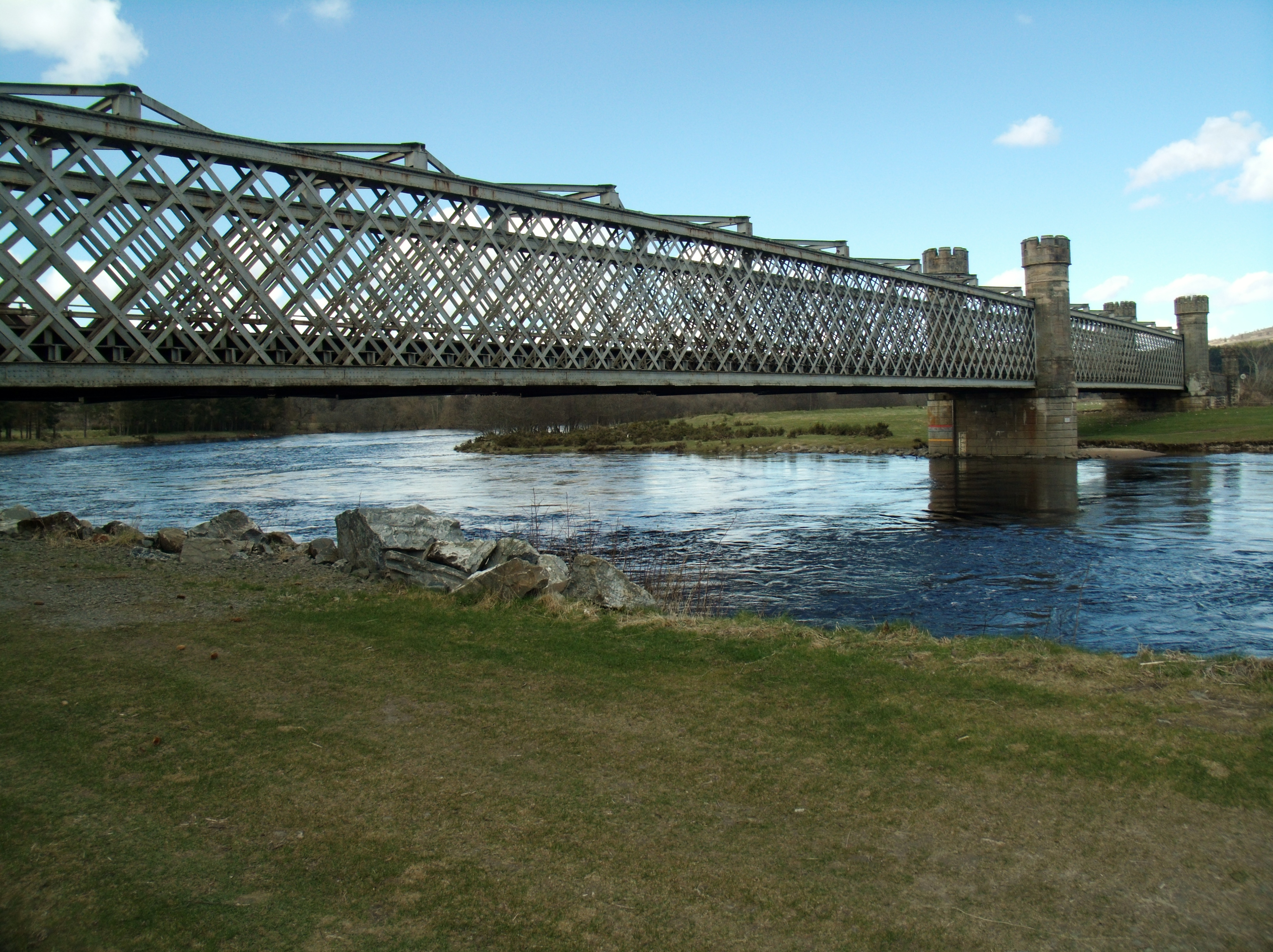
Dalguise Viaduct
