= Inverness and Perth Junction Railway =

UK railway company

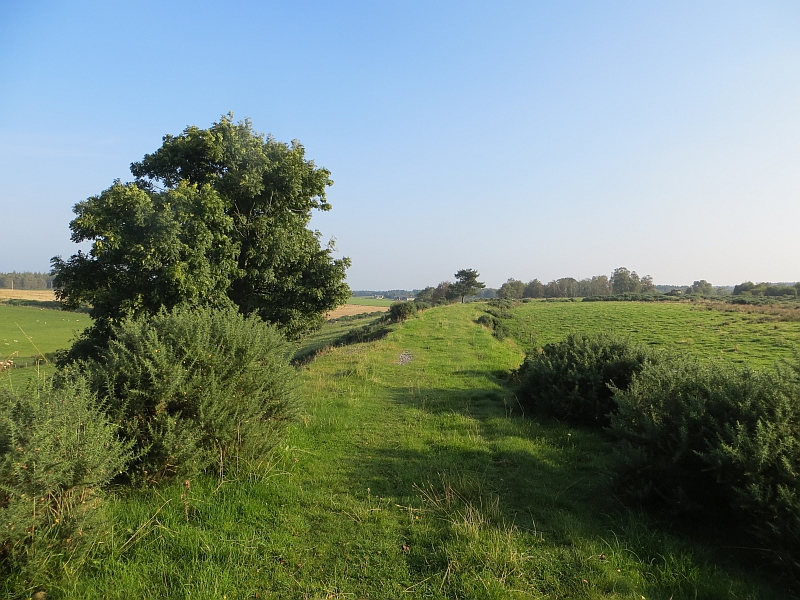
- A stretch of the former trackbed near Muir of Logie, Aberdeenshire

Overview
- Locale: Scotland
- Dates of operation: 1 June 1863–1 February 1865
- Successor: Highland Railway

Technical
- Track gauge: 1,435 mm (4 ft 8 1/2 in)

The Inverness and Perth Junction Railway (I&PJR) was a railway company that built a line providing a more direct route between Inverness and the south for passengers and goods. Up to the time of its opening, the only route was a circuitous way through Aberdeen. The I&PJR was built from a junction with the friendly Inverness and Aberdeen Junction Railway at Forres to the Perth and Dunkeld Railway at Dunkeld.

It opened for traffic in 1863. The northern part of its route crossed wild and sparsely populated terrain, and the high summits on the line were challenging for the locomotives of the day. In 1865 the company merged with the Inverness and Aberdeen Junction Railway, together forming the Highland Railway.

A short branch to Aberfeldy was built by the company 1865, and this closed in 1965.

Towards the end of the century the Highland Railway came under political pressure from competing railway proposals, and agreed to build a shorter route between Inverness and Aviemore, connecting back to the original line there. This opened in 1898. The original route from Forres to Aviemore closed in 1965, but the direct line from Inverness to Perth continues in operation as the Highland Main Line.

== A first railway for Inverness ==
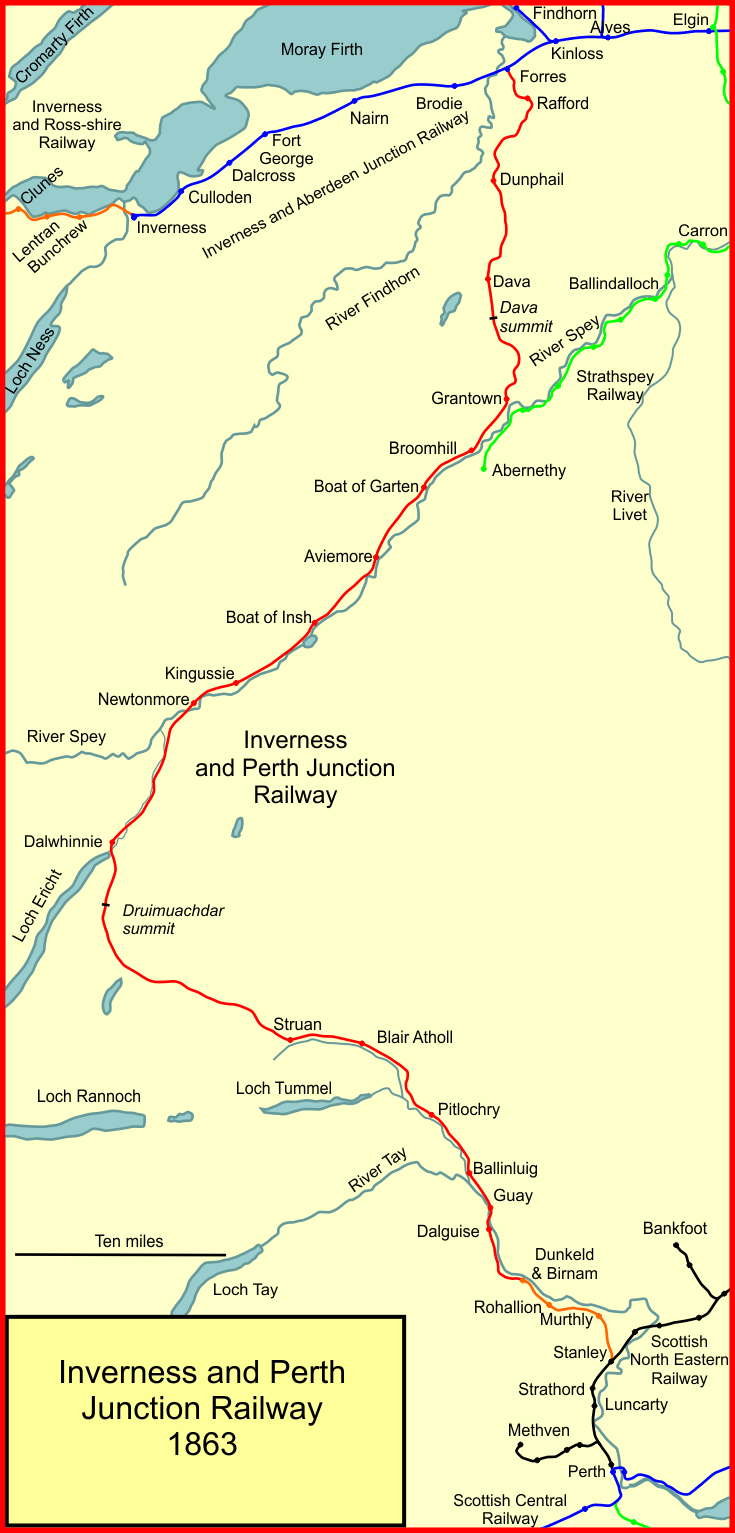
The Inverness and Perth Junction Railway in 1863

As railway construction gathered pace further south, a railway eventually reached Aberdeen along the east coast in 1850. By this time it was commonly understood that any town needed a railway connection if it was to thrive, and a town that failed to get one was doomed.

Interested parties in Inverness gave thought to getting a railway connection of their own, as they were aware of the commercial and social benefits. However the topographical obstacle of the Monadhliath Mountains obstructed any route running directly southward, and it was obvious that for the time being, such a railway was impracticable. They contented themselves with reaching Aberdeen, which at least would give them a connection to the south, albeit by a considerably roundabout route.

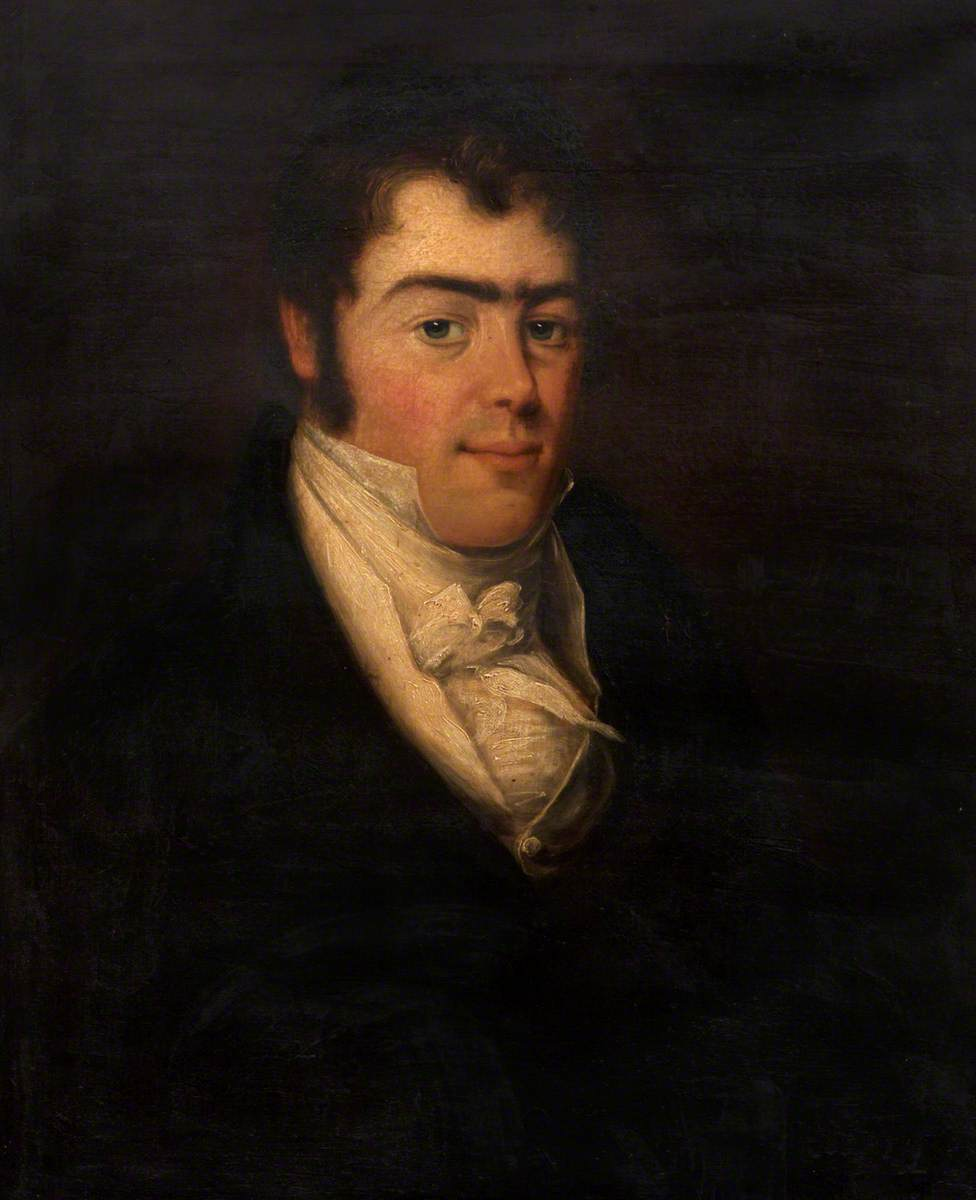
Joseph Mitchell

Joseph Mitchell was an engineer based in Inverness, and his dynamic approach coupled with that of business interests in the burgh, encouraged the development of a practical scheme to reach Aberdeen. Even that was a significant challenge, and the first step recommended by Mitchell, was an eastward railway to Nairn along the coast. The Inverness and Nairn Railway got its authorising act of Parliament, the Inverness and Nairn Railway Act 1854 (17 & 18 Vict. c. clxxvi), on 24 July 1854. The future southward trajectory was clearly indicated: the draft bill was entitled "The Inverness to Perth Railway Section from Inverness to Nairn (or northern section)". The Nairn line opened on 5 November 1855.

== Connecting to Aberdeen ==
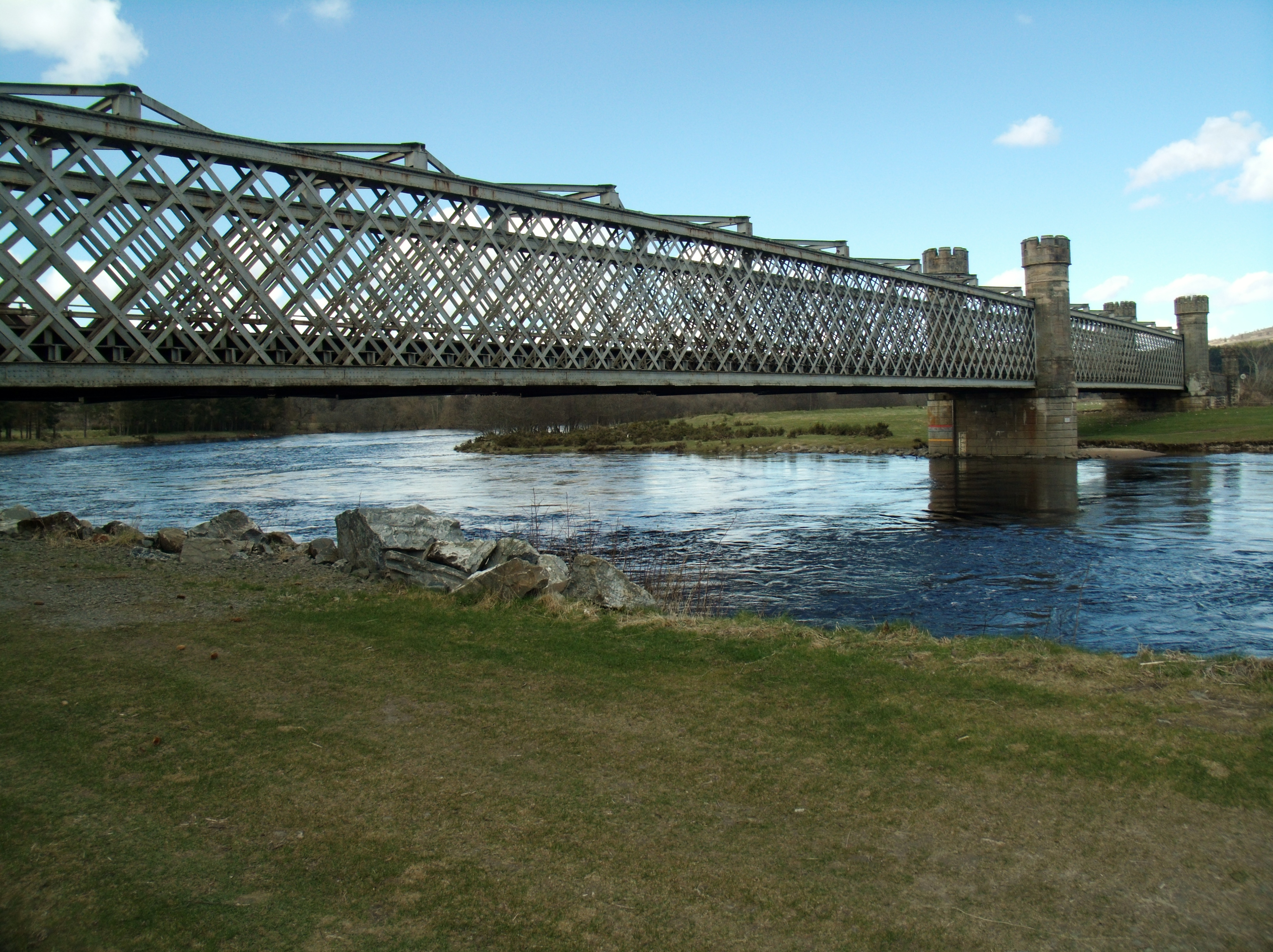
Dalguise Viaduct, built in 1863

Extending from Nairn to Aberdeen was the next step, but this was daunting in its magnitude; an alliance with interests in Aberdeen seemed a possible way forward. After much difficult negotiation, the Great North of Scotland Railway was formed and built a line from Aberdeen to Keith, opening to that place on 10 October 1856. At the western end, the Inverness and Aberdeen Junction Railway (I&AJR) was formed to build from Nairn to Keith; the I&AJR was authorised by the Inverness and Aberdeen Junction Railway Act 1856 (19 & 20 Vict. c. cx) on 21 July 1856; that section opened on 18 August 1858. From that date the I&AJR worked the Inverness and Nairn Railway, but for the time being the latter company retained its independent existence. The I&AJR later absorbed the Inverness and Nairn Railway on 17 May 1861.

== Turning south ==
Although this was useful progress, a more direct southward route was still sought, and the technical development of locomotive power had greatly improved, rendering a route climbing over high passes in the mountains at least feasible. The point at which such a line would strike south had originally been intended to be Nairn, but the commercial value of fishing interests further east on the I&AJR was a significant factor, and the southward starting point was altered to be Forres. A prospectus for the formation of the line was issued in 1860.

Inverness and Perth Junction Railway Act 1861
- Act of Parliament
- Parliament of the United Kingdom
- Long title: An Act for making a Railway from Forres to Birnam near Dunkeld, with a Branch to Aberfeldy, to be called "The Inverness and Perth Junction Railway;" and for other Purposes.
- Citation: 24 & 25 Vict. c. clxxxvi

Dates
- Royal assent: 22 July 1861

The Inverness and Perth Junction Railway was formed by the Inverness and Perth Junction Railway Act 1861 (24 & 25 Vict. c. clxxxvi) on 22 July 1861, with share capital of £654,000. The route was to involve two summits at high altitude in crossing the mountains. The line would run to Dunkeld and join the existing Perth and Dunkeld Railway (P&DR) there; the P&DR ran from its "Dunkeld" station (actually in Birnam) to Stanley on the Scottish North Eastern Railway, and running powers into Perth were granted. The 103-mile (166 km) route from Forres to Aviemore was extremely thinly populated, generating very little intermediate traffic. It had a summit altitude at Druimuachdar of 1,484 feet (452 m); the summit at Dava was 1,052 feet (321 m) above sea level. The Inverness and Aberdeen Junction Railway would work the line.

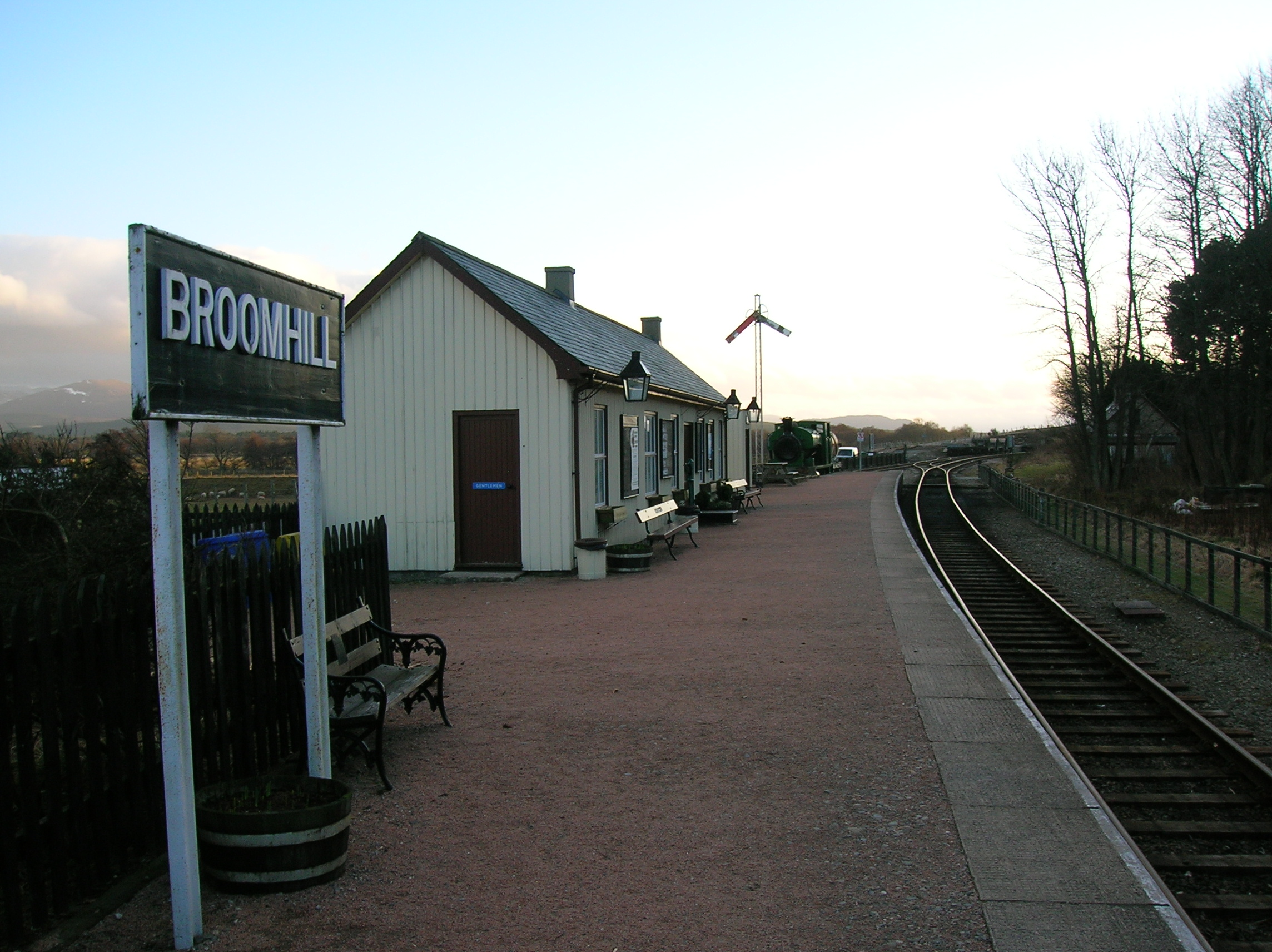
A view of the Broomhill platform and station buildings looking towards Boat of Garten

Despite the difficult terrain, there were relatively few major engineering works needed, although a large number of ordinary underbridges were required. The construction needed 8 viaducts, 126 bridges over rivers and streams and 119 over roads. Construction was swift, and the line opened in stages: Dunkeld to Pitlochry on 1 June 1863, Forres to Aviemore on 3 August 1863, and the final section from Aviemore to Pitlochry on 9 September 1863.

The train service was four trains each way daily, one of which conveyed goods; the journey time was between 6 hours and 6 hours 50 minutes.

Joseph Mitchell later recorded that the construction of the line had cost £798,111; land acquisition was £70,000 and parliamentary and preliminary engineering expenses amounted to £50,893: a lower cost per mile than comparable lines. He was also critical of the directors of the company for opening the line before everything was ready and before critical staff had been trained, and there was much disruption to operation in the first few days.

== Amalgamation to form the Highland Railway ==
The Inverness and Perth Junction Railway absorbed the Perth and Dunkeld Railway on 28 February 1864 under the Inverness and Perth Junction and Perth and Dunkeld Railways Amalgamation Act 1863 (26 & 27 Vict. c. lviii), and it amalgamated with the Inverness and Aberdeen Junction Railway on 1 February 1865; and the combined company changed its name to the Highland Railway on 29 June 1865, by the Highland Railway Act 1865 (28 & 29 Vict. c. clxviii). The I&AJR had already absorbed the Inverness and Ross-shire Railway, by the Inverness and Aberdeen Junction Railway Act 1862 (25 & 26 Vict. c. cxiii) of 30 June 1862.

At Perth the Scottish North Eastern Railway used the General station, controlled by the Scottish Central Railway (SCR). As guests of the SNER, the Inverness and Perth Junction Railway trains used the General station too. Clearly the SCR had an effective monopoly, and exploited it fully in their usage charges, which were £10,000 in 1865 increasing annually. The SNER and the I&PJR objected to this, without effect, and at one time the Inverness company considered building an independent line from Murthly to Perth; naturally the SCR objected to this, and the scheme did not proceed. For a short time the SNER established a station, Perth Glasgow Road, and terminated its trains there; passengers had to transfer to the General station for onward travel by walking through the street. Arbitration followed, managed by the Great Western Railway, and a limit of £5,000 in perpetuity, was determined.

== Aberfeldy branch ==
Strathtay and Breadalbane Railway Act 1846
- Act of Parliament
- Parliament of the United Kingdom
- Long title: An Act for making a Railway from the Line of the Perth and Inverness Railway to Aberfeldy, to be called "The Strathtay and Breadalbane Railway."
- Citation: 9 & 10 Vict. c. cccxvii

Dates
- Royal assent: 3 August 1846

The Strathtay and Breadalbane Railway Act 1846 (9 & 10 Vict. c. cccxvii) authorised the Strathtay and Breadalbane Railway to build from the Inverness and Perth line at Ballinluig to Aberfeldy; it was passed in anticipation of an early Inverness and Perth line, but that was not constructed, and the powers were suspended by an act of Parliament of 10 June 1847.

When the I&PJR was constructed, the Inverness and Perth Junction Railway Company itself built a branch line to Aberfeldy, from Ballinluig over much the same course as the earlier powers. There were 41 bridges on the route, which was the most expensive construction per mile in the eventual Highland system. It was 8 3/4 miles (14 km) long, and opened on 3 July 1865. There was an intermediate station at Grandtully. An additional station was opened at Balnaguard on 2 December 1935.

The entire Aberfeldy branch was closed on 3 May 1965.

== Double track on the main line ==
As the end of the nineteenth century approached, train weights on the main line increased considerably with faster, heavier and more frequent passenger trains. The working of banking engines down the gradient after assisting trains up to the summits compounded line capacity difficulties, and it was time to improve matters. The Highland Railway (Additional Powers) Act 1897 (60 & 61 Vict. c. ccxvi) was passed on 6 August 1897 empowering the company to double the line from Stanley Junction to Aviemore. At Aviemore the new direct line to Inverness (see below) was already under construction. New capital to the amount of £750,000 was part of the authorisation, although much of this was probably allocated to the constriction of the direct line.

By 2 July 1900 doubling had been completed from Blair Atholl to the crossing loop at Dalnacardoch, and was through to Dalnaspidal by 13 May 1901. In the meantime, it had been decided to carry the double track as far as the County March crossing loop, and this was reached on 10 June 1901. The section from County March to Dalwhinnie was completed by 17 May 1910. "County March" had been a crossing place, and the name was now replaced by Druimuachdar Summit.

Although the legal powers were extended, first by the Highland Railway Act 1905 (5 Edw. 7. c. lxxxix), and again by the Highland Railway Order Confirmation Act 1915 (5 & 6 Geo. 5. c. xxxi), no more doubling of the existing route was carried out.

== Inverness and Aviemore Direct Railway ==
In time, the eastward sweep from Inverness to Aviemore was seen to be an unnecessary complication, particularly as increasing traffic volumes came from the Dingwall section. Moreover, the Great North of Scotland Railway was known to be planning a new line from Elgin, Moray to Inverness, and the West Highland Railway was planning an approach up the Great Glen from Fort William. Parliament was expected to be sympathetic to those proposals if the Highland Railway was not improving its line for the benefit of its own customers.

In 1883 therefore steps were taken to build a shorter and more direct route from Inverness to Aviemore, the Inverness and Aviemore Direct Railway, informally known as the Carr Bridge route, in distinction to the designation of the original course as the Dava route. This was authorised by the Highland Railway (New Lines) Act 1884 (47 & 48 Vict. c. clxxxiii) on 28 July 1884. The spelling Carr Bridge was used at first, generally superseded by Carrbridge after a short time.

In any event, for the Highland Railway this was the most important development of the decade. The cut-off was 34 1/2 miles (56 km) of new line between Aviemore and Inverness. The Highland Railway did not hasten to construct the authorised line, and eventually four extensions of time to complete the line were granted – two before and two during construction.

The Direct Line was opened in stages: from Aviemore to Carr Bridge on 6 July 1892; from Carr Bridge to Daviot on 8 July 1897; and finally from Daviot to Inverness (Millburn Junction) on 1 November 1898. The Direct Line had a new summit, at Slochd, 1,315 feet.

== Operational issues ==
The steep gradients on the line, both via Dava and via Carrbridge, required extensive double-heading of trains. The Highland Railway constructed a number of 0-6-4T locomotives for banking goods trains. In 1909, the North British Locomotive Company built four powerful 0-6-4 tank engines to the design of Peter Drummond, for use as banking engines. Four more were delivered in 1911. These were the HR's largest tank engines and worked mostly between Blair Atholl and Dalnaspidal on banking duties, and on local services between Blair Atholl and Perth. They were withdrawn between 1932 and the end of 1936.

Until 1907 all goods trains on the line had an additional brake van in the middle of the train to ensure sufficient brake power on the downhill sections. Two dozen sprags were kept, spaced at intervals, beside the line near Slochd summit in case of emergencies.

== Closure of the Dava section ==
The Carrbridge route did not abstract all the through traffic from the Dava route, and many through trains continued to use it. However in time it became apparent that the retention of two lengthy mountain routes was unsustainable, and steps were taken to close the Dava route. It was closed on 18 October 1965, together with numerous intermediate stations on the remainder of the route. The original Inverness and Perth Junction Railway route between Aviemore and Stanley Junction continued to carry trains on the Inverness main line, which of course used the Carrbridge route north of Aviemore.

A goods service to Dallas Dhu distillery was continued to Forres East until 21 May 1967, and that short section of line was officially closed on 30 June 1967. Forres West curve was retained until 15 August 1966. The line from Aviemore to Boat of Garten continued in use for goods traffic until 16 June 1969.

== Strathspey Railway ==
Following closure of the section north of Aviemore, the Strathspey Railway heritage line has reopened the line north from Aviemore to Boat of Garten with services beginning in 1978. This was extended to Broomhill in 2002, making a total distance of about ten miles. The long-term aim is to reopen as far as Grantown-on-Spey.

== Locations ==
- Forres; opened 25 March 1858 for Inverness and Aberdeen Junction Railway; replaced by station aligned for Dava route on 3 August 1863; still open;
- Rafford; opened 3 August 1863; closed 31 May 1865;
- Dunphail; opened 3 August 1863; closed 18 October 1965;
- Dava; opened 1 November 1864; closed 18 October 1965;
- Dava summit; 1,052 feet;
- Castle Grant Platform; opened 1938; closed 1949;
- Grantown; opened 3 August 1863; renamed Grantown-on-Spey 1 June 1912; renamed Grantown-on-Spey West 5 June 1950; closed 18 October 1965;
- Broom Hill; opened 3 August 1863; closed 18 October 1965;
- Boat of Garten; junction with Strathspey Railway (GNoSR); opened 3 August 1863; closed 18 October 1965;
- Aviemore; junction with Inverness and Aviemore Direct Railway; opened 3 August 1863; still open;
- Boat of Insch; opened 9 September 1863; renamed Kincraig 1 September 1871; closed 18 October 1965;
- Kingussie; opened 9 September 1863; still open;
- Newtonmore; opened 9 September 1863; still open;
- Dalwhinnie; opened 9 September 1863; still open;
- Druimuachdar Summit; 1484 feet;
- Dalnaspidal; opened June 1864; closed 3 May 1965;
- Struan; opened 9 September 1863; closed 3 May 1965;
- Black Island Platform; first used 17 June to 2 July 1904; not in public timetable; closed 11 April 1959;
- Blair Athole; opened 9 September 1863; renamed Blair Atholl 7 September 1893; still open;
- Killiecrankie; opened 1 July 1864; closed 3 May 1965;
- Pitlochry; opened 1 June 1863; still open;
- Aberfeldy Junction;
- Ballinluig; opened 1 June 1863; closed 3 May 1965;
- Guay; opened 1 June 1863; closed 3 August 1959;
- Dalguise; opened 1 June 1863; closed 3 May 1965;
- Dunkeld & Birnam; end on connection with Perth and Dunkeld Railway; opened 7 April 1856; still open
- Rohillion;
- Murthly;
- Stanley Junction.

=== Aberfeldy branch ===
- Aberfeldy; opened 3 July 1865; closed 3 May 1965;
- Grandtully; opened 3 July 1865; closed 3 May 1965;
- Balnaguard; opened 2 December 1935; closed 3 May 1965;
- Ballinluig; main line station.

== Current operations ==
The part of the line between Aviemore and Stanley Junction continues in use in 2022, as part of the Highland Main Line; passenger services are operated by ScotRail. The Strathspey Railway heritage line operates between Aviemore and Broomhill.
