= Aviemore Speyside railway station =

Disused railway station in Aviemore, Highland

Coordinates: 57°11′29″N 3°49′41″W

Aviemore Speyside
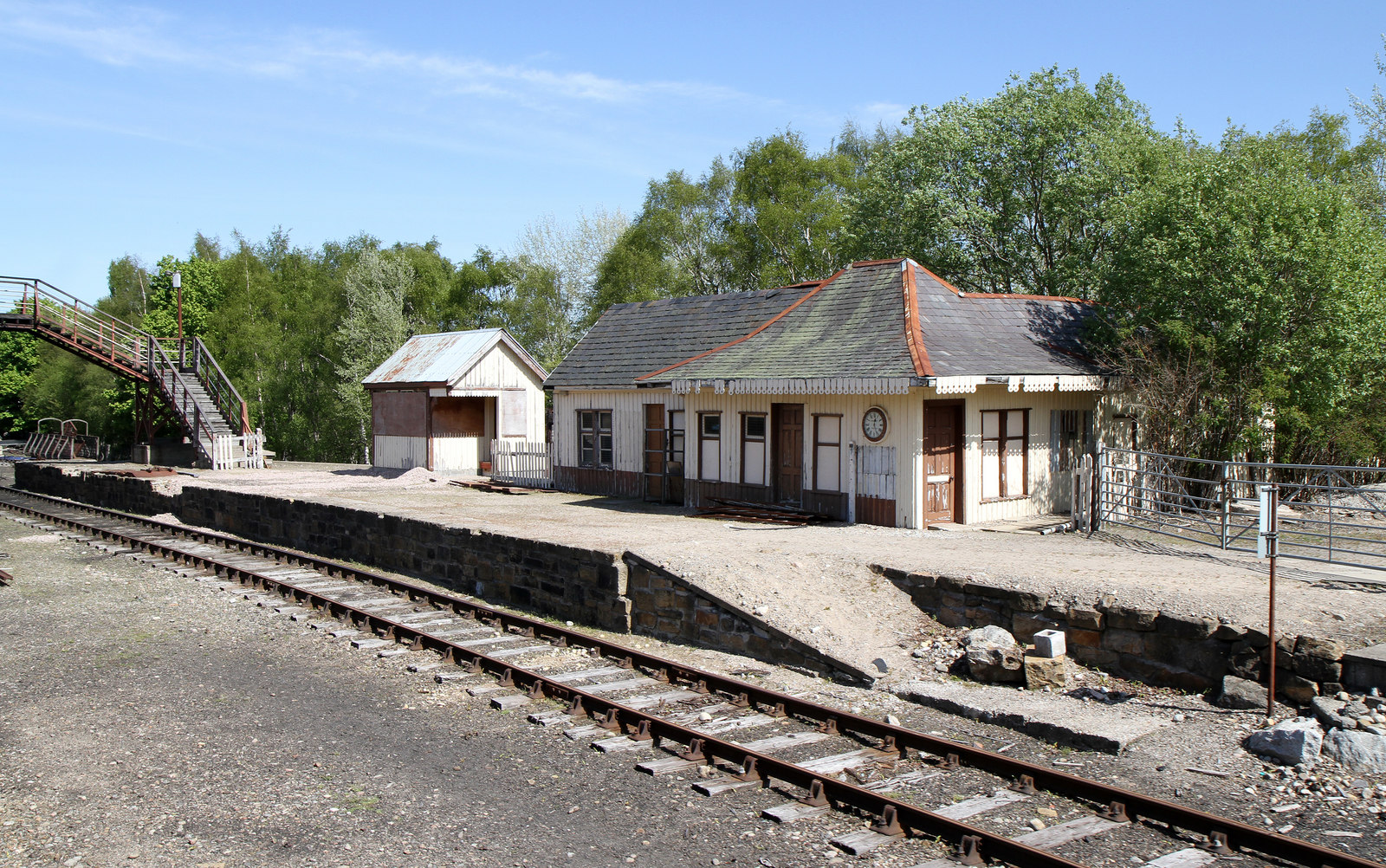
- Aviemore Speyside station, 2011

General information
- Location: Aviemore, Highland; Scotland
- Grid reference: NH897129
- Platforms: 2

Other information
- Status: Disused

History
- Original company: Strathspey Railway

Key dates
- 22 July 1978: Station opens
- July 1998: Station closes
Location

Aviemore (Speyside) railway station is an old station in Aviemore, Scotland that closed in July 1998. It was the main terminus on the Strathspey Railway which is still open as a heritage railway and tourist attraction. The station was built in the late 1970s from components from Dalnaspidal, a station on the Highland Main Line closed as part of the Beeching Axe. When the Strathspey Railway was founded, British Rail refused access to Aviemore railway station and the company was forced to construct its own terminus up the line in the railway yard.

The role of the station came to an end when, in the 1990s, the Aviemore Centre came to be redeveloped. An effort was launched to bring the village's most popular tourist attraction closer to the centre of the village. Meanwhile, then station owner Railtrack was seeking to cover some of the maintenance backlog on its estate. When all the parties had agreed, the redevelopment went ahead. When the refurbished main line station was opened, Aviemore Speyside fell out of regular use, though it was at first retained as a fallback in case of problems with Network Rail.

In July 2013 the station building was dismantled and transported to Inshriach House, 3 miles (5 km) to the south of Aviemore. The estate plans to reconstruct the station building as a recording studio. The site is now used as a coal bunker.

Preceding station	Heritage railways	Following station
Aviemore Terminus	Strathspey Railway Station closed	Boat of Garten towards Broomhill
