= Clava cairns of Aviemore =

Scottish cairns

Coordinates: 57.198767°N 3.827386°W

There are three Clava cairns in or near the Scottish Highland town of Aviemore. All three were described by Caleb George Cash, an honorary fellow of the Royal Scottish Geographical Society, in 1906.

== Delfour stone circle ==
The stone circle is 4 miles (6.4 km) south-west of Aviemore railway station, and 2 miles (3.2 km) north-north-east of Kincraig railway station, and in 1906 was located near a cottage. Its condition, as described by Cash in 1906, is ruinous; it could hardly be recognized as anything other than "a heap of stones cleared by the farmer from his fields". One stone of "striking appearance" is still standing. The middle circle of about 60 feet (18 m) in diameter seems to have been used for the purpose of field clearing, with stones from the outer circles having been deposited there. The one solitary stone from what may have been an outer circle stands about 22 feet (6.7 m) south-west from the middle circle; it is a quartzite slab, 9 ft 6 in (2.90 m) high, 5 ft 6 in (1.68 m) wide, and 1 ft 6 in (0.46 m) thick. Since it is tapered toward the top, it appears to Cash as a "cloaked human figure".

There is an outer kerb (58 ft or 18 m in diameter) and an inner ring, made of smaller stones. There was a bank of small stones just outside the kerb, which was part of the design; stones from the field have been thrown onto that bank.

=== Gallery ===
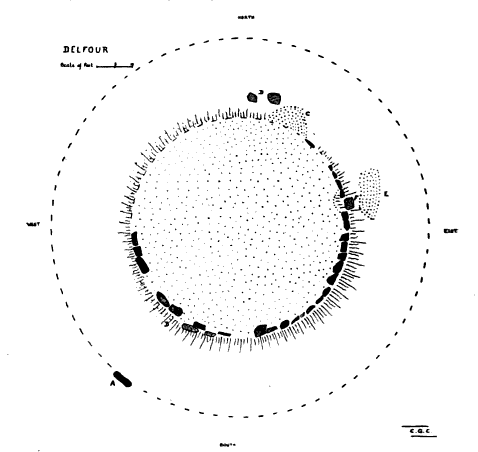
Drawing by Cash, 1906

== Aviemore stone circle ==
The cairn consists of three stone circles, or remnants thereof. The outer one, of detached megaliths, is about 75 ft (23 m) in diameter. The second circle is of graded kerbstone sets closely, with a diameter of about 42 feet (13 m), and the inner circle is about 26 feet (7.9 m). The cairn is mostly gone and only three or four slabs are left.

In 1877 there were still seven stones standing in the centre; when Aubrey Burl detailed the cairn in 2005, there were only five left, one of which has fallen. The tallest is 4 ft 11 in (1.5 m) high. The cairn is currently in the middle of a housing estate.

=== Gallery ===
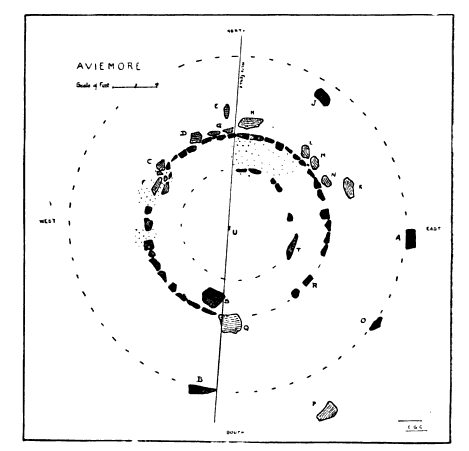
1906 drawing by Cash

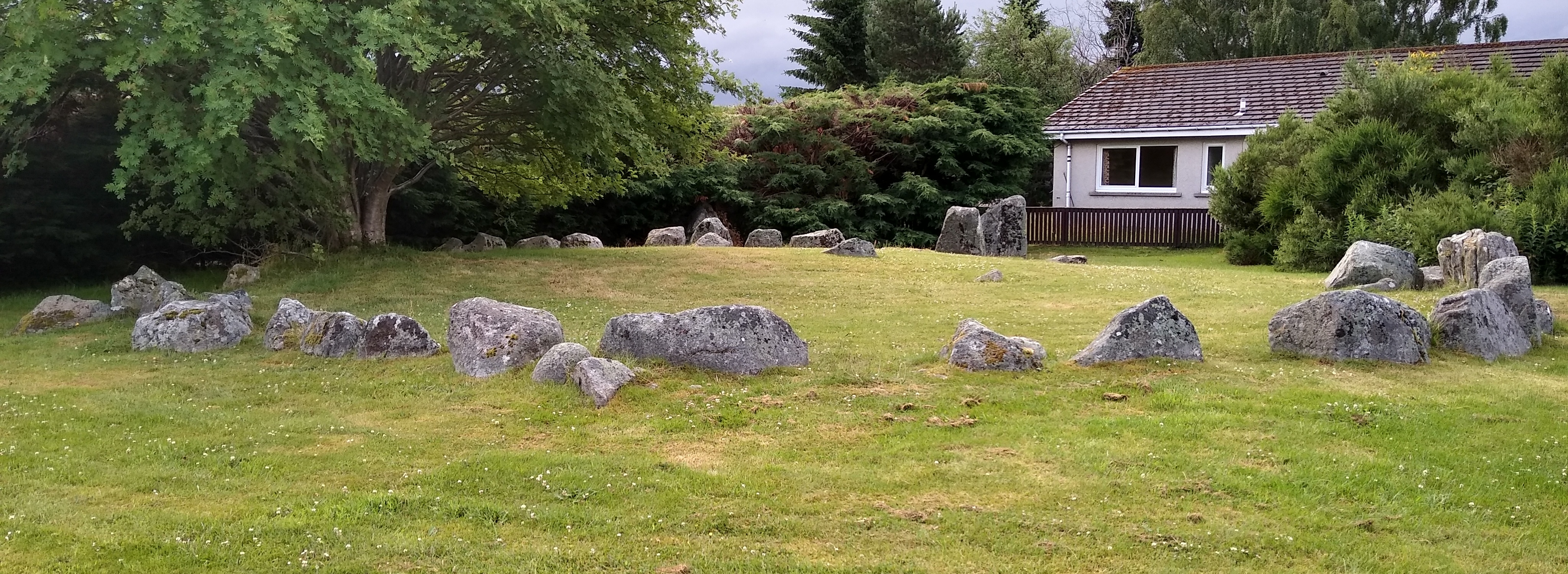
Aviemore stone circle

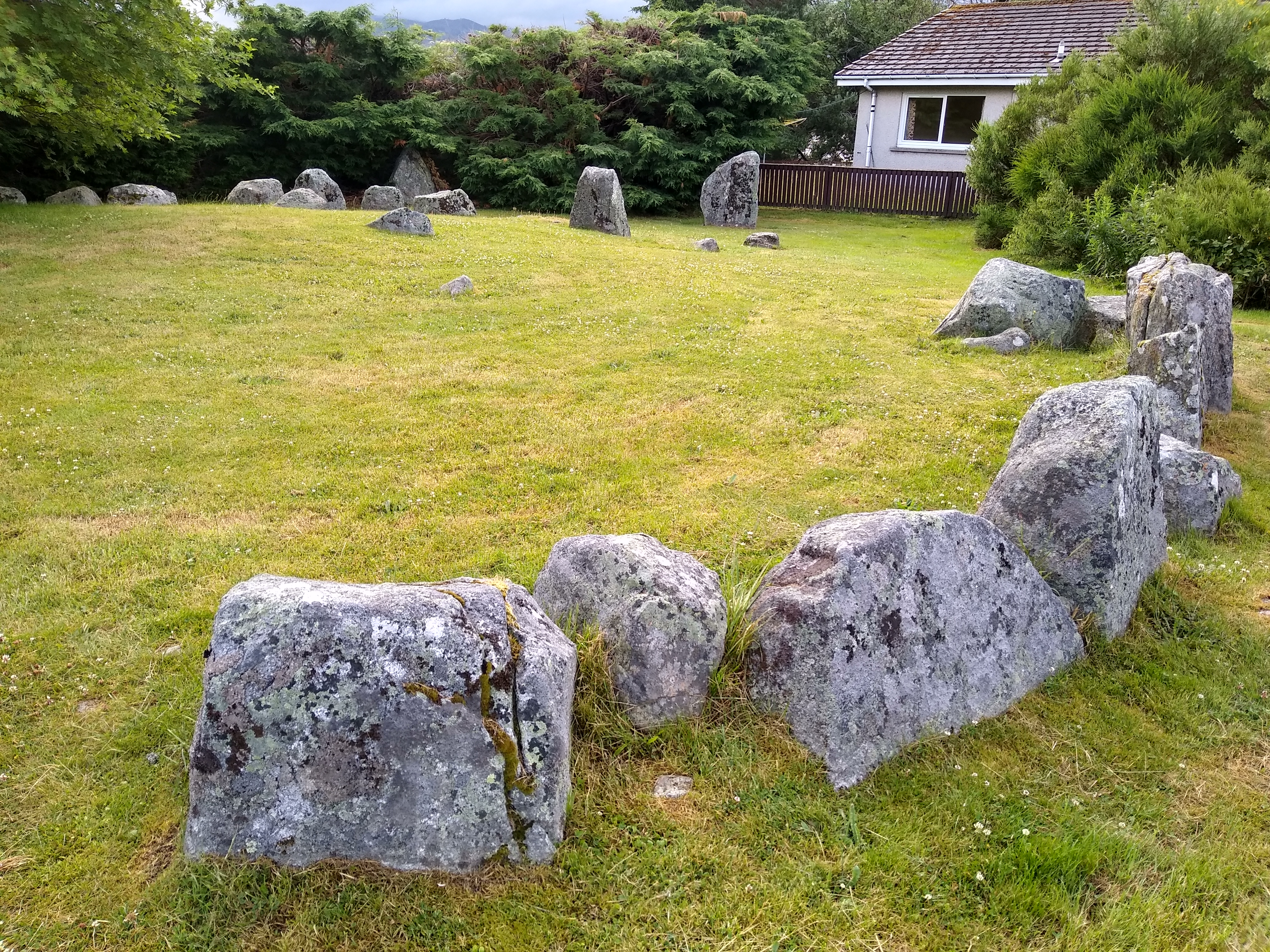
Aviemore stone circle

== Grenish stone circle ==
The Grenish circle is a little over 2 miles (3.2 km) east-north-east of the Aviemore railway station, some 350 yards (320 m) east of the road, in an area of uneven moorland that was once covered in pine trees. A nearby lochan gets its name from the stones: Loch nan Carraigean, or "Loch of the Standing Stones". The Highland Railway's line to Carr Bridge runs nearby (now the preserved Strathspey Railway), only a few yards (metres) from the outer circle on the west side; equally close on the east side runs an old path from Aviemore to Boat of Garten.

=== Gallery ===
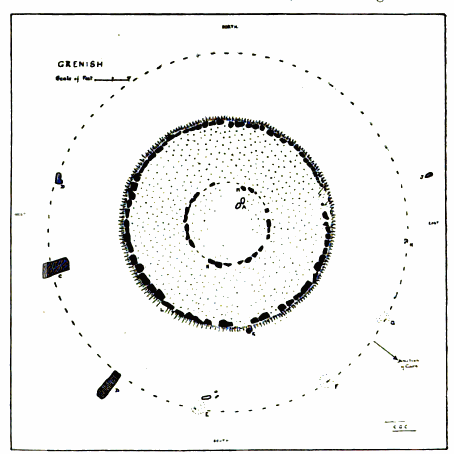
1906 drawing by Cash

== See also ==
- Culloden Viaduct
