= Grantown-on-Spey (West) railway station =

Former railway station in Scotland

Coordinates: 57.3228°N 3.6218°W

Grantown-on-Spey (West) railway station was opened with the Inverness and Perth Junction Railway in 1863. Originally appearing on timetables as 'Grantown', the name was changed by British Railways. At the same time, the former GNSR station 'Grantown-on-Spey' was renamed similarly as 'Grantown-on-Spey (East)'.

== Location ==
The station was located to the south of Grantown-on-Spey, just off the B9102, at the end of Woodlands Terrace. The woodlands to the east of the station location are named 'Station Wood' on OS maps available when the railway was open.

== Closure ==
The station closed along with line to Aviemore on 18 October 1965. The goods service had ceased earlier that year on 5 July.

== Bustitution ==
No replacement bus services are available between Forres and Grantown-on-Spey. A rail connection is available by travelling to Carrbridge. Buses are available to Aviemore and Inverness. There is no public transport across the Dava moor.

== Remains ==
The station building was bulldozed in the early 1980s and now fills the gap between the platforms at Grantown-on-Spey (West) station. The stationmaster's house remains.

== Re-opening ==
The Strathspey Railway is raising funds to complete their "Rails to Grantown" project. Work and fundraising are underway to re-open the route, and construct a new station at the location of Grantown-on-Spey (West).

Preceding station	Heritage railways	Following station
Proposed extension
Broomhill Line closed, station open towards Aviemore	Strathspey Railway	Terminus
Historical railways
Broomhill	Inverness and Perth Junction Railway	Castle Grant Platform; Line and Station closed
