= Broomhill railway station =

Railway station in Scotland

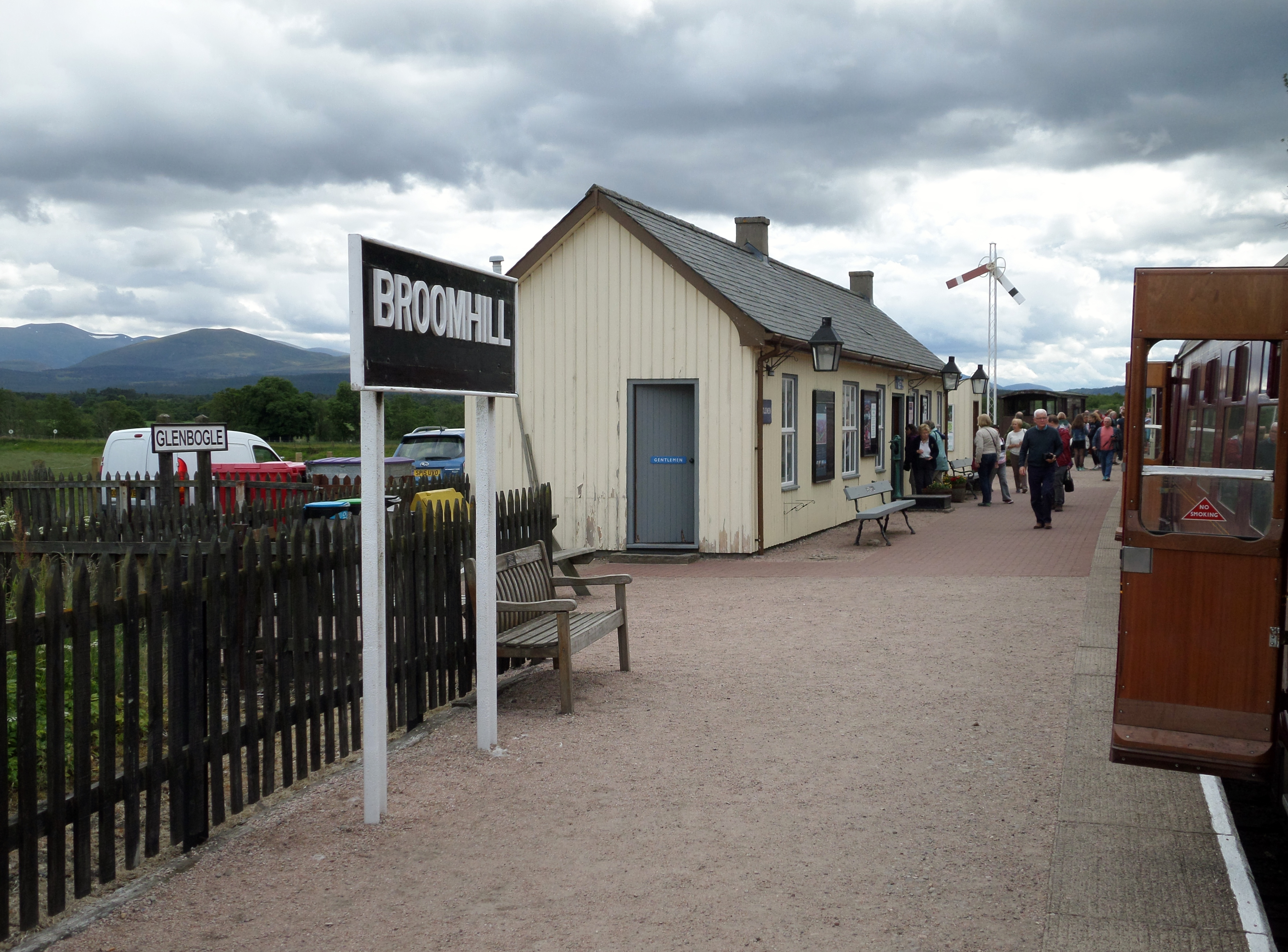
- Broomhill station in 2016

General information
- Location: Nethy Bridge and Dulnain Bridge, Strathspey; Scotland
- Coordinates: 57.283400°N 3.666900°W
- Grid reference: NH 99613 22650
- Platforms: 1

Other information
- Status: Open

History
- Original company: Inverness and Perth Junction Railway
- Pre-grouping: Highland Railway
- Post-grouping: London, Midland and Scottish Railway

Key dates
- 3 August 1863: Station opened
- 18 October 1965: Closed
- 31 May 2002: Re-opened by the Strathspey Railway
Location

Broomhill railway station or Broomhill for Nethy Bridge railway station is a reconstructed railway station on the former Highland Railway main line which was originally built to serve the small villages of Nethy Bridge and Dulnain Bridge in Strathspey. It is at present the eastern terminus of the Strathspey Steam Railway.

== History ==
The railway station was opened by the Inverness and Perth Junction Railway (I&PJR) on its line to Forres in 1863, via Grantown-on-Spey (West), Dava, etc.

In 1923, the HR became part of the London, Midland and Scottish Railway and at nationalisation in 1948 became part of British Railways. Some trains stopped only on request, so a signal was used to show when passengers were waiting. |website= The line was recommended for closure by Dr Beeching's report "The Reshaping of British Railways" and closed on 18 October 1965.

Following closure in 1965 the station was demolished leaving only the platform and the nearby stationmaster's house. On 31 May 2002 the Strathspey Railway (preserved) re-opened the old station following its reconstruction.

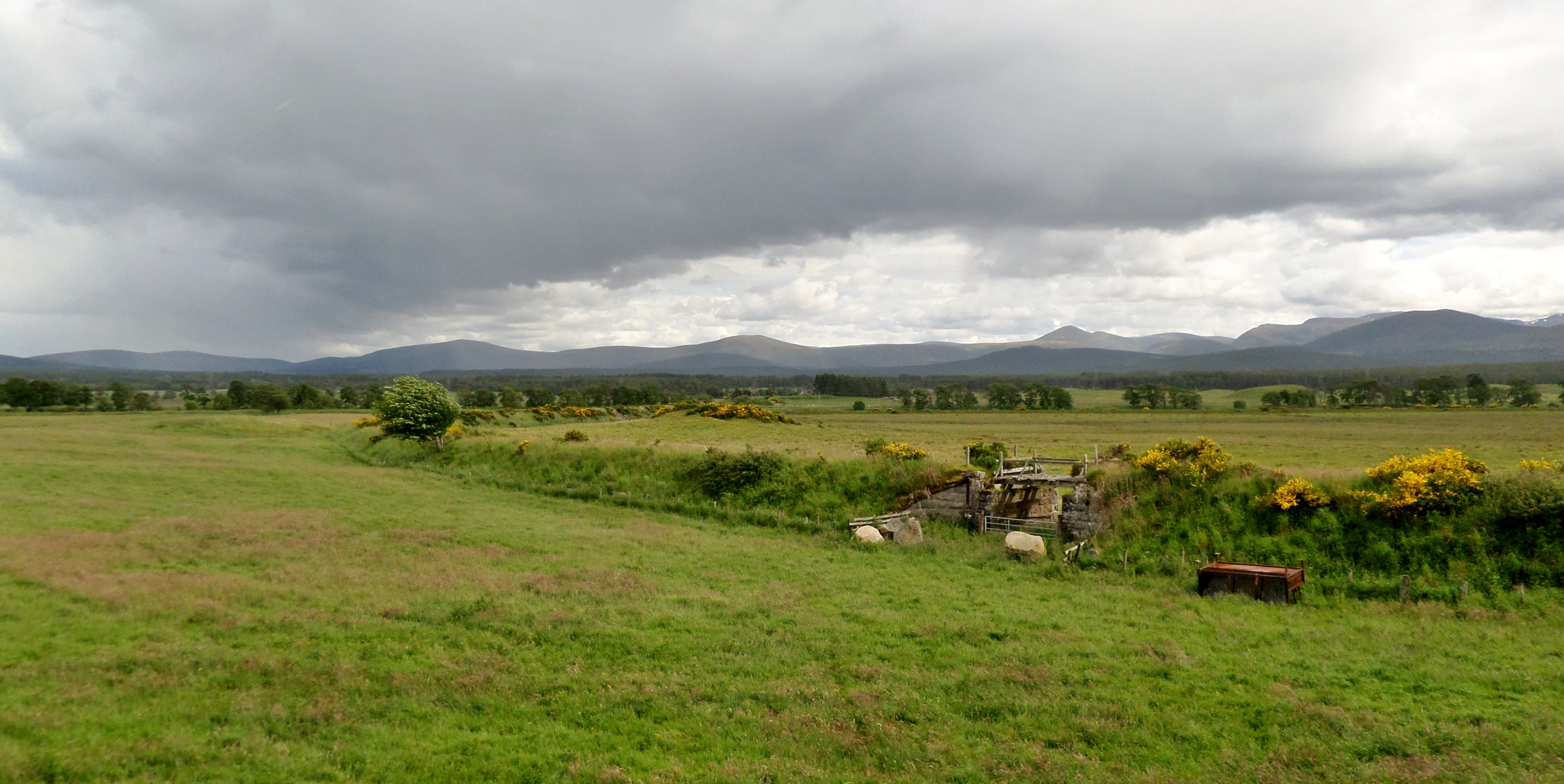
The old GNoSR junction at Broomhill

=== Broomhill Junction ===
The Great North of Scotland Railway's (GNoSR) Broomhill Junction lay on the line towards Boat of Garten and at this point the original GNoSR Strathspey Railway diverged, crossing the River Spey to reach Nethy Bridge, Grantown-on-Spey, Aberlour, Cromdale, Craigellachie, etc. The Highland Railway (HR) line ran parallel from Boat of Garten station to avoid the cost of a signal box and famously the two lines had different coloured ballast.

=== Inverness and Perth Junction Railway ===
The Inverness and Perth Junction Railway (I&JR) was promoted to link the Inverness and Aberdeen Junction Railway at Forres with the Perth and Dunkeld Railway. The necessary Act of Parliament was passed on 22 July 1861, the new line being opened between Dunkeld and Pitlochry on 1 June 1863, between Forres and Aviemore on 3 August 1863 and the final section to Aviemore and Pitlochry on 9 September 1863. The I&JPR combined with the Inverness and Aberdeen Junction Railway to form the Highland Railway on 1 February 1865.

== The station infrastructure ==
The 1867–71 OS map shows a single platform with a shelter, two sets of signal posts, a stationmaster's house and a weighing machine. A couple of sidings appear to end in a small goods shed. In 1903 the layout is the same with the addition of several small buildings. The station used to carry a significant amount of timber traffic originating in the surrounding forests.

A restored feature is the two armed signal with one arm operated by railway staff to control the trains and the other present for passengers to request a passenger train to stop.

In 2025, the platform was extended by 90 feet, allowing an extra carriage to have access.

== In popular media ==
Broomhill featured as the fictional Glenbogle railway station in the BBC's 'Monarch of the Glen' TV series. A 'Glenbogle' station board has been retained as a feature to celebrate this association with the books by Compton Mackenzie.

Preceding station	Heritage railways	Following station
Boat of Garten towards Aviemore	Strathspey Railway	Terminus
Proposed extension
Boat of Garten towards Aviemore	Strathspey Railway	Grantown-on-Spey Line and station closed Terminus
Historical railways
Boat of Garten	Highland Railway	Grantown-on-Spey
