= Strathspey Railway (preserved) =

Heritage railway in Scotland

The Strathspey Railway (SR) in Badenoch and Strathspey, Highland, Scotland, operates a ten-mile (16 km) heritage railway from Aviemore to Broomhill, Highland via Boat of Garten, part of the former Inverness and Perth Junction Railway (later part of the Highland Railway) which linked Aviemore with Forres. It is one of only a handful of former primary/secondary main lines to be preserved in Britain today.

== The route ==
=== Aviemore ===
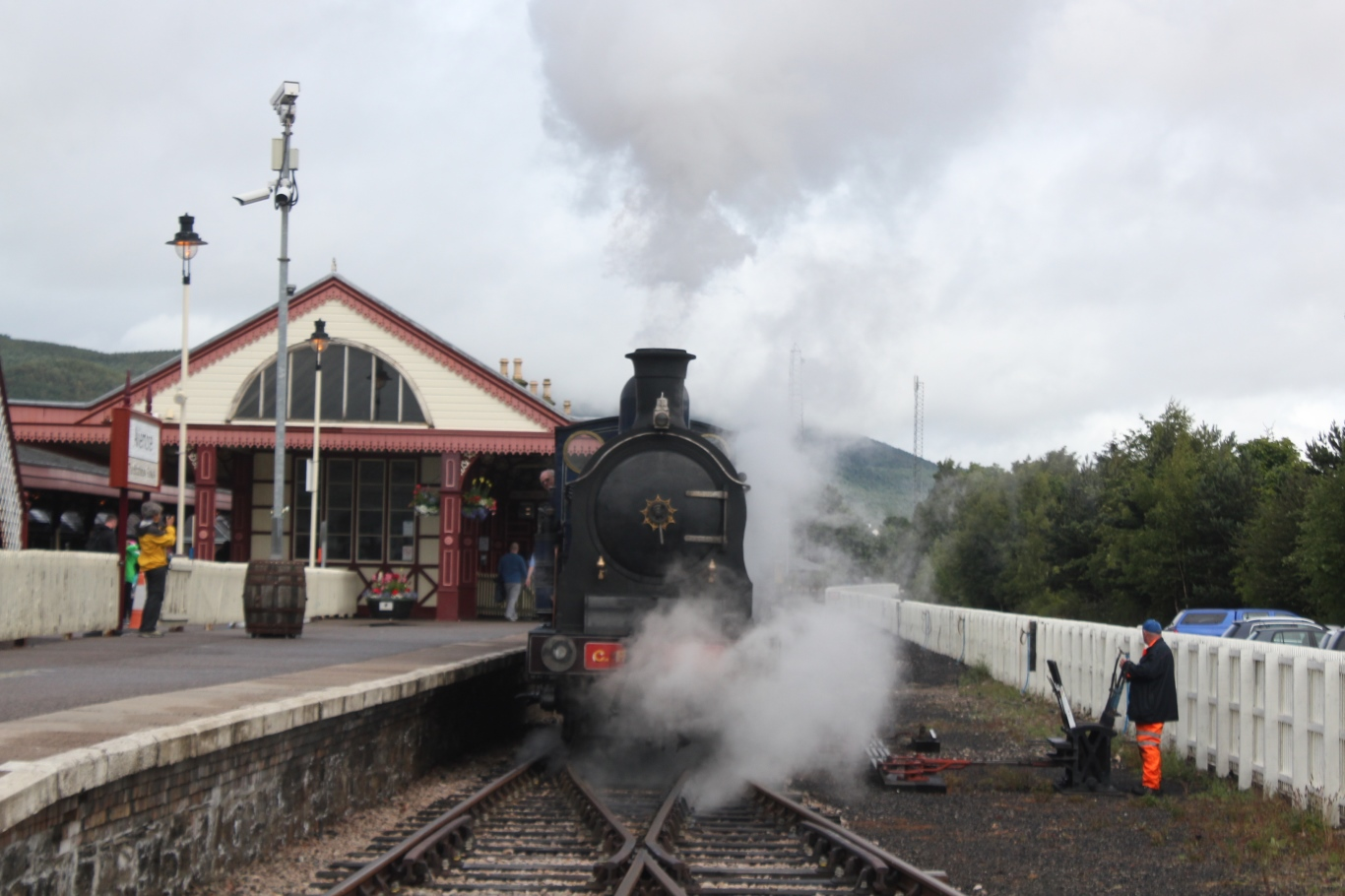
Aviemore – CR 828 running round

The Strathspey Railway operates from platform 3 of Network Rail's Aviemore railway station. Until 1998 the railway's southern terminus was Aviemore Speyside about 300 yards (270 m) further north. Aviemore Speyside is no longer in regular use, although its platform has been retained as a fallback in case of problems with access to the Network Rail station. Coaling of the steam locomotives is carried out at a facility constructed in 2014 on the site of the former Aviemore Speyside station building. Its signal box, which was formerly at Garve West and transported from there in 1986, was retained when the station itself shut. New features are gradually being brought into service at the Aviemore site controlled using traditional British Railways mechanical semaphore signalling.

From Aviemore, the line passes the four-road locomotive shed which was constructed by the Highland Railway in 1898. The original purpose of the shed was to house locomotives for the lines to Perth and Inverness (via Carrbridge and Forres). It was common for original Highland Railway engines to be allocated to the shed and in London, Midland and Scottish Railway (LMS) days it housed Stanier Black Fives, Pickersgill Bogies (Caledonian Railway), Caley 439 tanks, Caley 812 classes, and Fairburn Tanks. In British Railways days the shed was allocated the shed code '60B'. These days the engines that are in traffic on the Strathspey Railway still bear the 60B shedplate on their smokebox. The shed has a 60-foot (18 m) turntable, originally from Kyle of Lochalsh. There is also a carriage maintenance shed which was erected and opened for use in 2005; this shed allows the railway's volunteers and staff to work on its fleet of coaches indoors. On the opposite side of the line is a three road carriage storage shed erected and opened in 2011; this allows the coaches to be stored under cover and protected from the weather.

The former engine crew hostel, called Spey Lodge, stands just to the north. This building was erected by the LMS during the Second World War to provide railway crews with a safe and cheap option for accommodation whilst rostered to work locally. The British Railways Staff Association For Scotland then took it on to provide holiday accommodation for railway staff and their families. It was saved by the Strathspey Railway Company during the 1970s and gradually the facilities have been upgraded by volunteers. Spey Lodge now fulfils its original role again, providing hostel accommodation for engine crews and other volunteers working on the railway.

After Spey Lodge, the railway passes the site of the Aviemore Hospital then crosses Dalfaber level crossing, an Automatic Barrier Crossing Locally monitored (ABCL). This level crossing was not originally part of the railway, but was installed after the development of the Dalfaber Estate in the 1980s, and was upgraded to a half-barrier crossing in March 2023. Prior the barrier upgrade, the crossing had been involved in one major incident in 2005. After crossing the road and passing the Cairngorm Brewery the line climbs through Granish Moor. This heather moor affords views of Cairngorm Mountain and the line runs parallel to the Speyside Way, a popular walking and cycling route. Once into the forest at the north end of the moor, the line descends past Boat of Garten golf course and into the village of Boat of Garten itself.

=== Boat of Garten ===
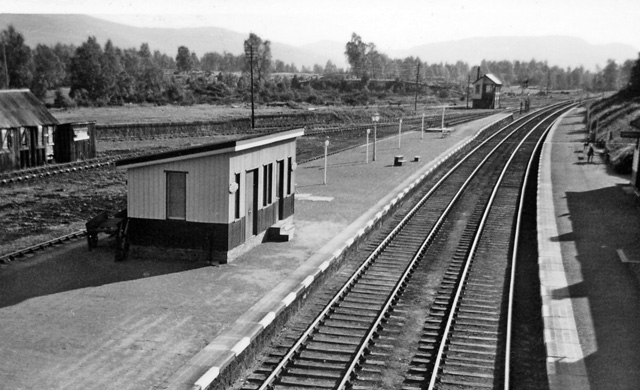
Boat of Garten in 1961

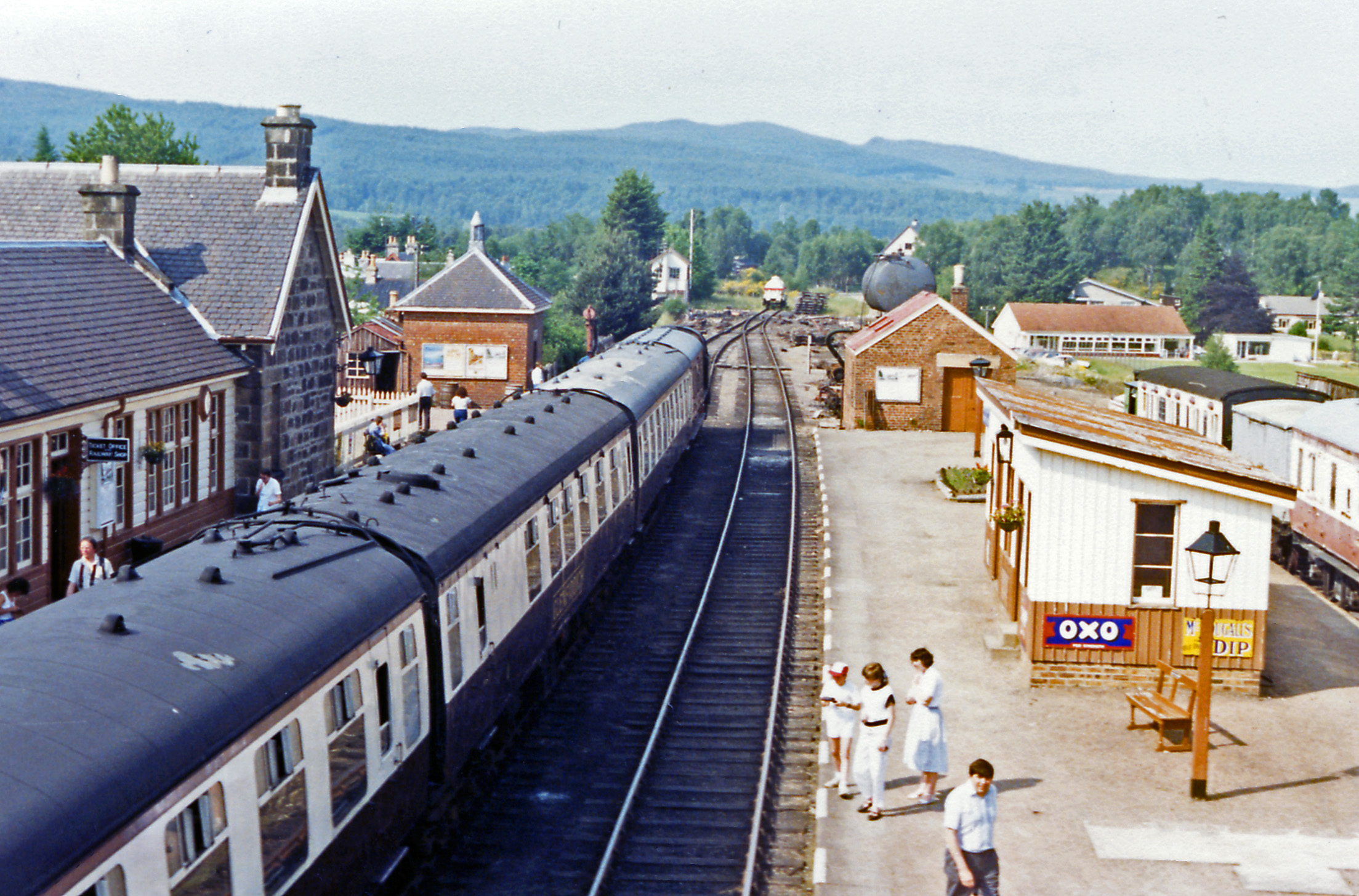
View northward, towards Broomhill 1986

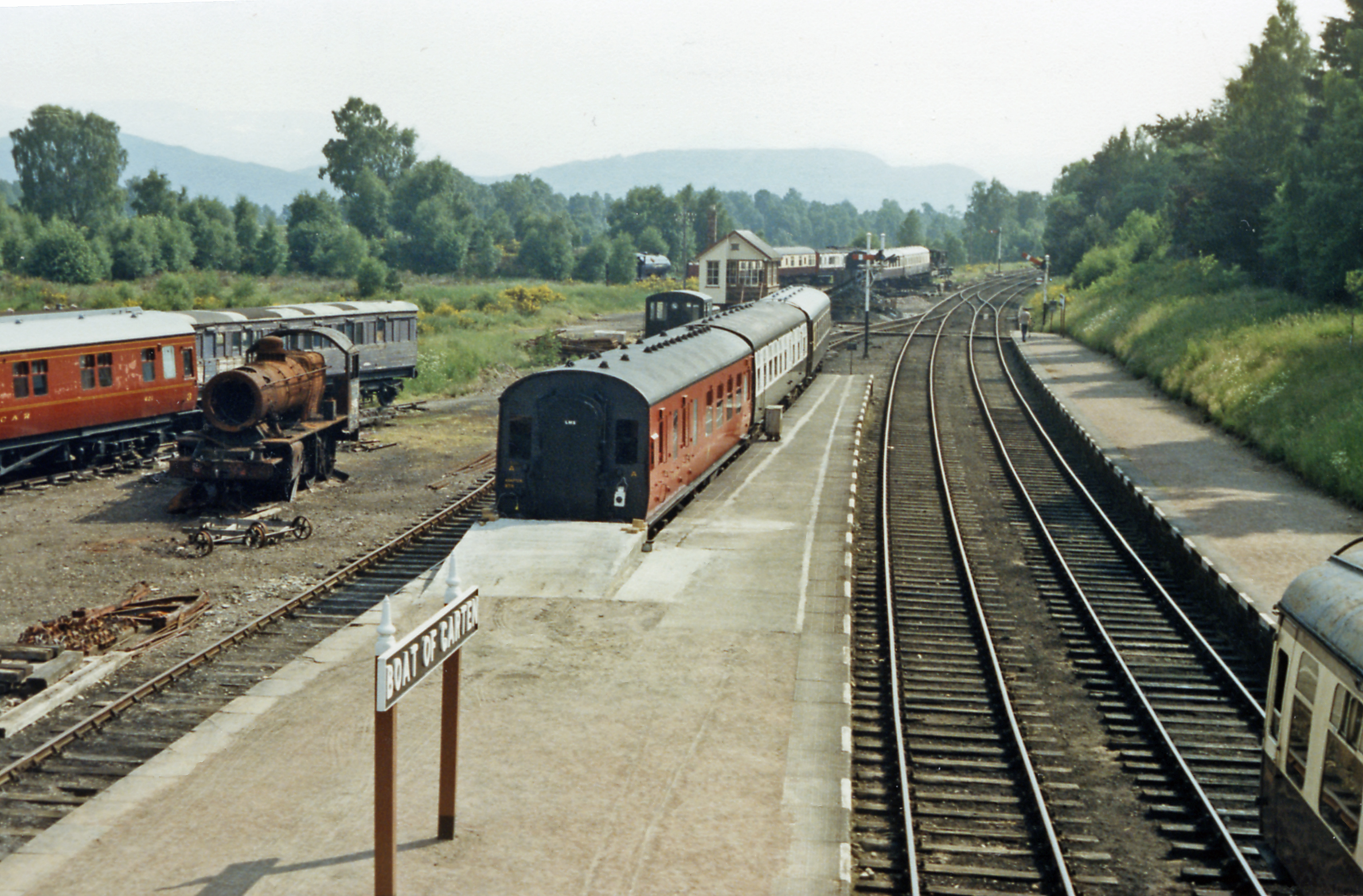
View southward, towards Aviemore in 1986

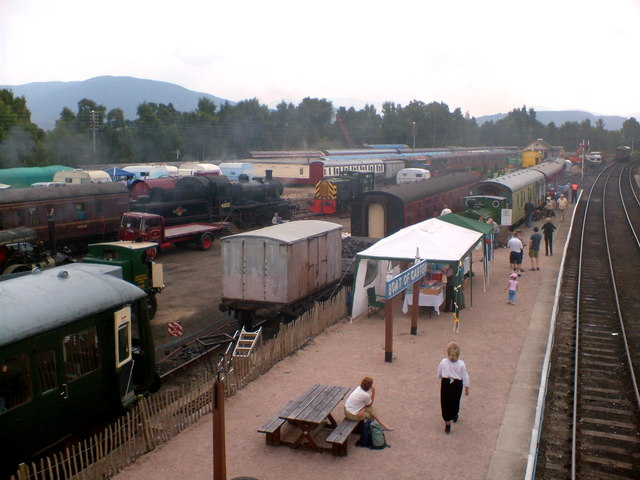
Steam rally in 2004

The extensive Boat of Garten station (57.2480°N 3.7524°W) features its original buildings, dating from 1904 by the architect William Roberts and is a category B listed building.. The modest station building houses a booking hall and ticket office/shop plus toilets and the waiting room which still has its open fire. A recent addition is a coffee shop in the old gas house on platform 1. It was originally a parallel junction between the Highland Railway's main line from Perth to Forres and the Great North of Scotland Railway (GNSR) branch to Craigellachie - this was the original Strathspey Railway, the company being a subsidiary of the GNSR. Today there are two passenger platforms and the yard stores the majority of the SR's out of use rolling stock.

Boat of Garten also has the railway's only water column where the locomotives stop to take water on their way north through the station. There are two signal boxes, Boat of Garten North and Boat of Garten South and signalling uses traditional British Railways mechanical semaphore signalling; it is the crossing point on the line when there are two trains running. The single track section from Boat of Garten South to Aviemore Speyside is controlled by Electric Key Token while that from Boat of Garten North to Broomhill is still worked by Staff and Ticket.

Most of what visitors to the railway see today is original from the days of British Railways. The main layout of the station has not been altered significantly, with the exception of the extensive yard behind the signal box. The turnout that formerly allowed access to the yard without having to access the headshunt was removed before the line closed and there are no plans to re-install it. A new storage shed was built over the first three tracks of the yard in 2018–2019 to provide additional covered accommodation.

Leaving Boat of Garten, trains cross the road on the new single-track box-girder bridge and pass the site of the original, long-demolished GNSR engine shed, where a permanent way depot now stands. The track had been lifted and structures demolished by British Rail after closure of the line in the 1960s. The railway now passes through mainly farmland following the River Spey on the re-laid track, which was mostly recovered from Kincardine power station in Fife in the 1990s. The tracks to Craigellachie and Grantown had originally left the station extending in a double track formation as far as Croftnahaven, where the GNSR line turned sharply south east and crossed the River Spey. This arrangement was adopted because a signal box for a junction here was deemed too expensive.

=== Broomhill ===
The line reaches its current terminus at Broomhill (57.2834°N 3.6669°W), in countryside roughly halfway between the villages of Nethy Bridge and Dulnain Bridge. The replica station building has been constructed on the foundations of the original. The run-round loop is beyond the station. Broomhill was used as the station for Glenbogle, in the BBC series "Monarch of the Glen".

== Future extension ==
In July 2006, the Scottish Executive made a firm commitment to re-aligning the A95 at Gaich, near Grantown. This move would allow the extension of the SR to Grantown along the original Highland Railway line to Dava and Forres. It is not now intended to reconstruct the former Grantown-on-Spey West railway station, now in an industrial estate; instead it is proposed to construct a new three-platform terminus on a greenfield site about 3/4 mile (1.2 km) further north. Track that was lifted from the Stirling to Alloa railway when it was relaid for a new passenger service has been donated to this project.

The BBC reported that the £2.9m road scheme would involve the rail line going under the A95. The then Transport Minister, Tavish Scott, said the project would be ready for construction by 2008–09 and funding had been allocated for 2009–10. Former Strathspey MP, Danny Alexander, speculated that the proposed rail link between Aviemore and Grantown would be good for tourism.

By May 2007 the trackbed had been cleared north of the Broomhill loop as far as the bridge over the River Dulnain. New fencing, mileposts and drainage works were progressing and it was hoped for track laying to start later in 2008. Travelling by road along the A95 from Grantown towards Aviemore, new fencing marking the new track alignment could be seen.

In October 2008, it was announced that the steelwork of the former Merry Street Bridge in Motherwell had been donated to the railway by Network Rail. In February 2014, the Strathspey Railway used this steelwork to replace the missing bridge over the River Dulnain. The bridge was installed, with the railway working with Colas Rail, who provided one of the few rail cranes in the UK capable of lifting the bridge into position. Following the installation, track has been laid across the bridge to the north side of the River Dulnain. No further construction work on the extension can be carried out until the Scottish Government grants the appropriate Statutory Order. Because the entire extension lies within the Cairngorm National Park, the formal application has had to be delayed so that additional wildlife and environmental studies can be undertaken.

However, Transport Scotland since notified the railway that the project has been reevaluated in late 2008 and was now estimated to cost £5.3 million, leading Transport Scotland to consider the extension project too expensive to pursue. The railway was faced with raising £1 million by 31 December 2009, to fund construction of a planned tunnel on the extension, but even if the funds were raised, construction was not guaranteed to occur. In June 2016, the entire project, including the re-aligned A95 and new bridge at Gaich, track and new station, was estimated at £13.5 million.

Management for building the extension is being undertaken by The Strathspey Railway Charitable Trust. All the various fundraising efforts are coordinated by the SRCT, including a charitable appeal. They also manage the negotiations with the various landowners and public bodies required to push the line through to Grantown-on-Spey.

== Locomotives and rolling stock ==
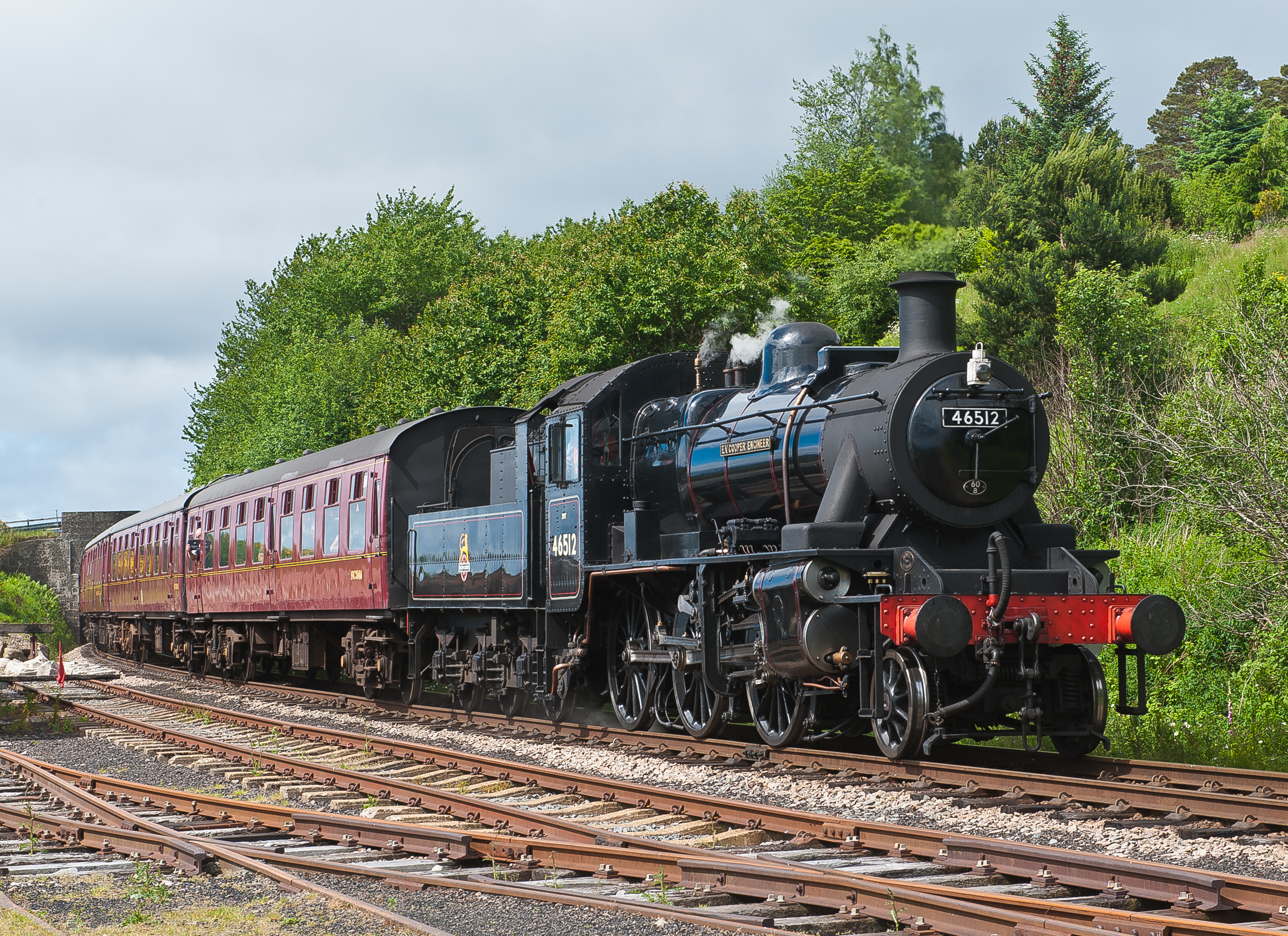
British Railways No. 46512, an Ivatt Class 2 2-6-0

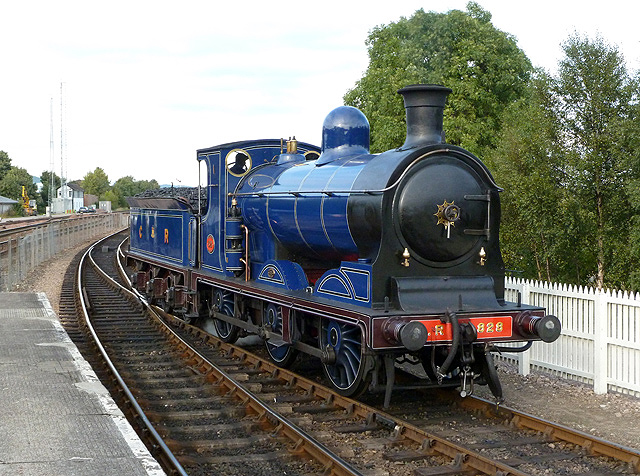
The unique Caledonian Railway 812 Class 0-6-0 No. 828

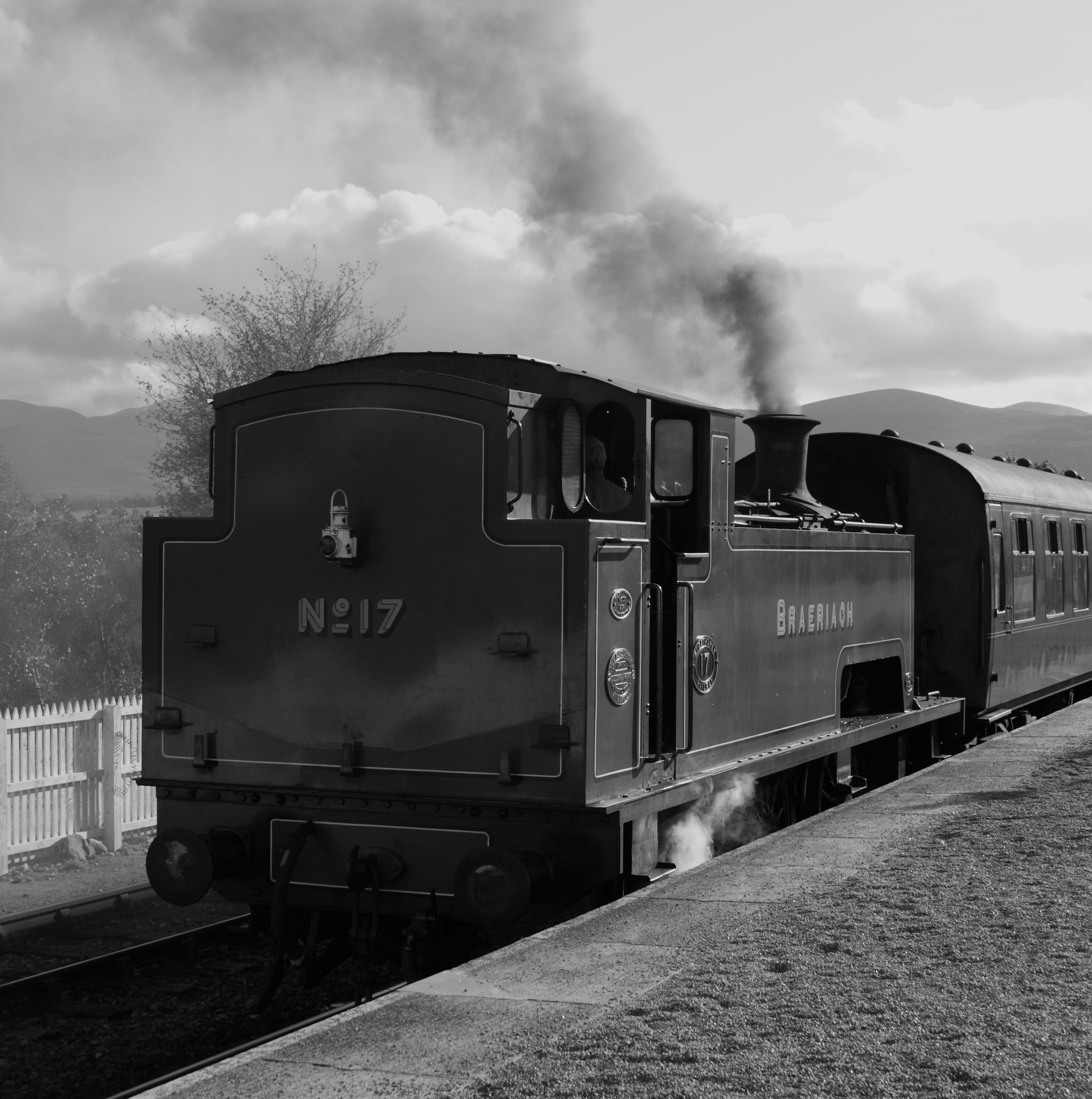
Andrew Barclay 0-6-0T No. 17 "Braeriach"

=== Steam locomotives ===
- LMS 2-6-0 Class 2MT no. 46512 "E. V. Cooper, Engineer". Built Swindon 1952. Owned by Highland Locomotive Company. Operational, ten-yearly overhaul completed in November 2021. Boiler ticket expires in 2031.
- LMS 2-6-0 Class 2MT no. 46464 (The Carmyllie Pilot). Built Crewe 1950. Owned by The Carmyllie Pilot Company Limited. Being rebuilt at Aviemore after returning in 2020. Boiler steam test completed in April 2022. Hauled the first steam passenger service on the SR on 22 July 1978 before leaving in 1989.
- Caledonian Railway 0-6-0 812 Class no. 828 (17566, BR 57566) built in 1899. Operational, boiler re-certified for another five years in autumn 2020. On hire to Spa Valley Railway.
- LMS 4-6-0 Class 5MT no. 5025 (45025) built in 1934. Operational, launched into service in August 2021 following a major overhaul. Boiler ticket expires in 2031.
- BR Standard Class 4 2-6-0 no. 76079. Built Horwich 1957. Purchased from North Yorkshire Moors Railway by Strathspey Railway in May 2026. Stored, awaiting overhaul.
- BR Standard Class 4 2-6-4T no. 80105. Built Brighton 1955. Relocated from Bo'ness and Kinneil Railway in May 2026 for overhaul under 'repair-and-run' agreement.
- BR Standard Class 9F 2-10-0 no. 92219. Built Swindon 1960. Privately owned by Graham Harris. Stored, awaiting restoration.
- Wemyss Private Railway 0-6-0T no. 17 "Braeriach", built by Andrew Barclay & Son, Kilmarnock 1935 (works number 2017). Stored in Boat of Garten.
- WD 0-6-0ST Austerity no. 9. Built Robert Stephenson and Hawthorns 1943 (works number 7097). Undergoing overhaul at Aviemore.
- Andrew Barclay & Son, Kilmarnock 0-4-0ST (works no. 2020 of 1936) no. 2 "Balmenach". Stored at Aviemore out of use.

=== Diesel locomotives ===
- BR 0-4-0 Class D2/10 North British shunter no. D2774. Operational, painted BR Green.
- BR 0-6-0 Class 08 no. 08490 (D3605). Operational, painted BR green.
- BR Bo-Bo Class 27 no. 27050 (D5394). Built in 1962. Operational, painted BR Green.
- BR A1A-A1A Class 31 no. 31327 (D5862). Operational, painted BR Green.
- BR Co-Co Class 37 no. 37674 (D6869). Operational, painted Railfreight Red Stripe.
- Andrew Barclay & Son, Kilmarnock 0-4-0 DH shunter. (Works no. 517 of 1966) "Power of Enterprise." Being restored in Aviemore loco shed.
- North British Locomotive Co 0-4-0 DH shunter. Works no. 27549 of 1956. Stored at Boat of Garten awaiting overhaul.
- Ruston & Hornsby 0-4-0 DM shunter. Works no 265618 of 1948. Queen Anne whisky livery. Operational.
- Ruston & Hornsby 0-4-0 DM shunter. Works no 260756 of 1950. Stored out of use at Aviemore.
- Thomas Hill Vanguard 4w chain drive DH shunter. Works no. 277V of 1977. Operational.

=== Diesel multiple unit cars ===
- BR Class 107 DMBS Sc51990. Stored at Boat of Garten out of use.
- BR Class 107 DMBS Sc52008. Stored at Boat of Garten out of use.
- BR Class 107 DMSL Sc52030. Awaiting restoration.
- BR Class 114 DTC E54047. Out of service.
- BR Class 117 DMBS Sc51367. Out of service; under repair. Currently painted in BR green livery with speed whiskers.
- BR Class 117 DMS Sc51402. Out of service; under repair. Currently painted in BR green livery with speed whiskers.
- BR Class 117 TCL Sc59511. Under active restoration at Boat of Garten to be painted in BR green livery. Current plan of the owning group is to reinstate the first class seating, but remove the second class sections and replace with a buffet area. When the restoration is complete it will be coupled between Sc51367 and Sc51402 to form a prototypical 3-car class 117 set.

In 2026, the railway announced that it had received a gift of £1 million from an unnamed American benefactor, to be used for the renovation of the line's rolling stock.

== Passenger coaching stock ==
Railway	Number	Type	Image	Notes
Great North of Scotland Railway	None	5-comp non-corridor third		Built at Inverurie. Body has been repainted red.
Great North of Scotland Railway	None	5-comp non-corridor third		Built at Inverurie. Currently at Aviemore Speyside Station.
Highland Railway	None	5-comp non-corridor third		Built at Lochgorm. Stored outside under black cover with protection at an exposed end.
North British Railway	1748	Non-corridor lavatory Third		Built in 1905 at Cowlairs. Only of its type left. Carriage is a full wooden body with original underframe and bogies.
London, Midland & Scottish Railway	27234	Third Open		Built in 1945 at Wolverton. LMS livery, currently stored non-operational.
London, Midland & Scottish Railway	27043	Brake Third Corridor		Built in 1951 at Derby. 'Porthole' design. Awaiting overhaul, stored.
British Railways	1928	Mk1 Unclassed Restaurant Car		Built in 1959 by BRCW. Previously used on Flying Scotsman train. Built with Gresley Bogies.
British Railways	1936	Mk1 Unclassed Restaurant Car		Built in 1959 by BRCW. Previously used on Flying Scotsman train. Built with Gresley Bogies. Under restoration.
British Railways	4079	Mk1 Tourist Second Open		Built in 1955 at Swindon. Not operational. Stored.
British Railways	4331	Mk1 Tourist Second Open		Built in 1956 by BRCW. In BR Crimson and Cream livery. Operational
British Railways	4477	Mk1 Second Open	Second open number 4477 at Aviemore station.	Built in 1957 by BRCW. In BR Crimson and Cream livery. Operational.
British Railways	4777	Mk1 Second Open		Built in 1957 by BRCW.
London, Midland and Scottish Railway	M45021M	Bogie District Engineers Saloon	LMS Officers Saloon	Built in 1944 by LMS at Wolverton, lot 1262. LMS livery. Operational.
British Railways	17101	Mk 2A Brake Corridor First	Brake Corridor First number 17101 at Aviemore Station	Built in 1968 at Derby. Operational.

== Stations ==
- Aviemore railway station
- Aviemore Speyside railway station (closed)
- Boat of Garten railway station
- Broomhill railway station
