= Aviemore =

Town in the Highlands of Scotland

Coordinates: 57.194°N 3.823°W

Aviemore: Scottish Gaelic: An Aghaidh Mhòr
- Town
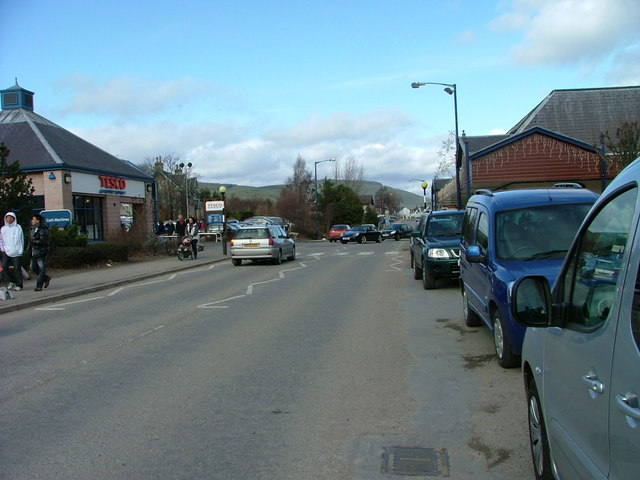
- A view of Aviemore main street, 2010

- Location within the Badenoch and Strathspey area
- Population: 3,230 (2020)
- Language: English; Scottish Gaelic
- OS grid reference: NH898129
  - Edinburgh: 90 mi (140 km)
  - London: 420 mi (680 km)
- Council area: Highland
- Country: Scotland
- Sovereign state: United Kingdom
- Post town: Aviemore
- Postcode district: PH22
- Dialling code: 01479
- Police: Scotland
- Fire: Scottish
- Ambulance: Scottish
- UK Parliament: Moray West, Nairn and Strathspey
- Scottish Parliament: Skye, Lochaber and Badenoch

Aviemore (/ˌæviˈmɔːr/; Scottish Gaelic: An Aghaidh Mhòr [ən̪ˠ ˈɤːɪ ˈvoːɾ]) is a town and tourist resort, situated within the Cairngorms National Park in the Highlands of Scotland. It is in the Badenoch and Strathspey committee area, within the Highland council area. The town is popular for skiing and other winter sports, and for hill-walking in the Cairngorm Mountains.

== Etymology ==
Aviemore represents the Gaelic form An Aghaidh Mhòr. Aghaidh may be Pictish and involve an element equivalent to Welsh ag meaning "cleft".

== History ==
=== Early history ===
The area was already inhabited in the Bronze Age, and three clava cairns remain.

Clan Shaw’s roots in Aviemore center around the Rothiemurchus estate. Following a historic 1396 victory at Perth, the Shaws were granted these lands. Today, the clan legacy is most visible at the 14th-century burial ground of their chief and the Doune of Rothiemurchus. The Shaws' hold on the Aviemore territory was short-lived. By the 16th century, the growing power of neighboring clans—specifically the Gordons and the Grants led to fierce land disputes. In 1570, the Shaws lost their battle for the territory after Alan Shaw was accused of murdering his stepfather and was forced to flee Scotland. The Doune of Rothiemurchus subsequently passed into the hands of the Clan Grant.

=== Early modern era ===
Prior to 1790, Aviemore was in an exclave of the county of Moray and from 1890 to 1975 it was in the county of Inverness-shire, until the latter date being within the civil parish of Duthil and Rothiemurchus. The village began to grow as a result of it becoming a railway junction in 1898, following which the Highland Railway became a major employer, constructing housing for its staff and the Aviemore Hotel.

=== Tourism ===
Aviemore became one of the first skiing resorts to be established in Scotland with the opening of the chairlift in 1961. After the ski centre opened the population of the village grew. The resort has since grown into Britain's most visited ski resort during the winter months.

The Aviemore Hotel was destroyed by fire in 1950, and its site and that of its golf course were used in the 1960s for the construction of the Aviemore Centre. It was opened by Lady Fraser of Allander (wife of Sir Hugh Fraser, 2nd Baronet, House of Fraser) in 1966. "The Centre", as it became affectionately known, quickly developed into a major Scottish tourist destination, and in its heyday royalty were regular visitors, including Prince Charles and Princess Anne who attended Royal Hunt Balls hosted in the Aviemore Centre's Osprey Rooms. The very popular BBC TV show It's a Christmas Knockout was held in the complex twice in the 1970s.

Rothiemurchus Golf Club, Aviemore (now defunct), was founded in 1906. The club and course closed at the time of the Second World War.

=== Recent history ===
Around 1998, many of the original John Poulson buildings were demolished as part of a promised £50 million overhaul. Although the visitor buildings were replaced, many of the other leisure facilities were not. In 2006 a privately led tourist organisation began a programme of attracting tourists to the area.

It is also notable for being near the freely grazing reindeer herd at Glen More, the only one in the United Kingdom.

The Cairngorm Mountain Railway, owned by the Highlands and Islands Enterprise (HIE), was closed in October 2018 "due to health and safety concerns", or "structural problems" according to reports in summer 2019. At the time, an investigation was still underway to determine whether modifications would be "achievable and affordable".

On 10 July 2019, an announcement stated that a contract had been finalised for the construction of the Badenoch & Strathspey Community Hospital and Health Care Centre in Aviemore. The 24-bed facility, to be built by Balfour Beatty, was expected to open in spring 2021.

A previous report in February 2019 had provided additional specifics as to the plan. In addition to the rooms, the hospital was expected to have 12 consultation and treatment rooms, three minor injuries and out-of-hours treatment rooms, X-ray facilities and an outpatient department; paramedics would also be based here.

During the summer of 2019, filming for the 25th James Bond film, No Time to Die, took place in the town and in the surrounding areas of Cairngorms National Park. Temporary accommodations were constructed in a car park in the town for the production crew of around 300. Some scenes were also being shot at the Ardverikie House Estate, just outside the park, roughly 50 miles (80 km) southwest of the town.

== Education ==
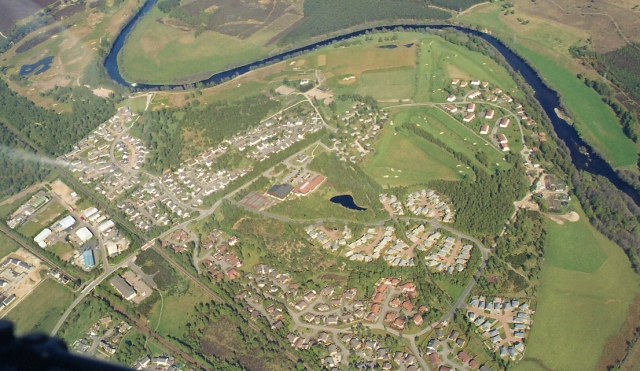
Panorama

Aviemore has a primary school, as well as an early years education provision, and Highlife Highland member facilities within the primary school. It caters for pupils from nursery, to P1-7 (ages 3–12). Aviemore Primary School was originally located just outside of Aviemore in Rothiemurchus. The primary school was then rebuilt in Milton Park, and lasted over 40 years, before being replaced by the current Aviemore Primary School, which started being built in March 2011, and officially opened in August 2012. The new school includes 10 primary classrooms, two general purpose classrooms, a main hall, pre-school education and childcare facilities, additional support needs facilities, a multi-purpose sports hall, kitchen and dining facilities, support for learning unit, biomass boiler and a fenced sports pitch.

There is also Aviemore Community Centre, which is in the school, that offers Highlife Highland facilities, such as a gym, meeting room, dance studio and a library. The school also has an Additional Support Needs base, which serves primary pupils from Badenoch and Strathspey. Most Primary 7 pupils from Aviemore Primary School will, after transition days in June, end up transferring to the catchment area secondary school, Kingussie High School, after the summer holidays.

== Geography and climate ==
Aviemore lies on the B9152 (the "old" A9 road since the main road from Inverness to Perth was rebuilt further west in 1980). Aviemore railway station is on the Highland Main Line and Aviemore is also the southern terminus of the Strathspey Railway, a heritage railway.

Aviemore has an oceanic climate (Köppen: Cfb) with cool temperatures and rainfall throughout the year. The highest temperature recorded was 32.2 °C (90.0 °F) on 12 July 2025. The lowest was −25.0 °C (−13.0 °F) in 8 February 1895.

Climate data for Aviemore (228 m asl, averages 1991–2020, extremes 1956–present)
Month	Jan	Feb	Mar	Apr	May	Jun	Jul	Aug	Sep	Oct	Nov	Dec	Year
Record high °C (°F)	12.5 (54.5)	15.8 (60.4)	23.0 (73.4)	24.2 (75.6)	29.0 (84.2)	31.3 (88.3)	32.2 (90.0)	30.6 (87.1)	26.7 (80.1)	25.5 (77.9)	16.7 (62.1)	14.8 (58.6)	32.2 (90.0)
Mean daily maximum °C (°F)	5.3 (41.5)	6.0 (42.8)	8.2 (46.8)	11.4 (52.5)	14.6 (58.3)	16.7 (62.1)	18.8 (65.8)	18.1 (64.6)	15.7 (60.3)	11.6 (52.9)	7.9 (46.2)	5.4 (41.7)	11.7 (53.1)
Daily mean °C (°F)	2.3 (36.1)	2.7 (36.9)	4.3 (39.7)	6.8 (44.2)	9.5 (49.1)	12.2 (54.0)	14.2 (57.6)	13.6 (56.5)	11.4 (52.5)	7.9 (46.2)	4.6 (40.3)	2.2 (36.0)	7.7 (45.9)
Mean daily minimum °C (°F)	−0.6 (30.9)	−0.6 (30.9)	0.5 (32.9)	2.1 (35.8)	4.4 (39.9)	7.6 (45.7)	9.5 (49.1)	9.2 (48.6)	7.2 (45.0)	4.2 (39.6)	1.4 (34.5)	−0.9 (30.4)	3.7 (38.7)
Record low °C (°F)	−21.5 (−6.7)	−26.2 (−15.2)	−17.4 (0.7)	−9.5 (14.9)	−5.1 (22.8)	−3.2 (26.2)	−1.1 (30.0)	−2.7 (27.1)	−4.6 (23.7)	−8.6 (16.5)	−17.1 (1.2)	−24.6 (−12.3)	−26.2 (−15.2)
Average precipitation mm (inches)	117.7 (4.63)	86.7 (3.41)	74.8 (2.94)	59.5 (2.34)	64.9 (2.56)	66.4 (2.61)	64.0 (2.52)	72.7 (2.86)	71.5 (2.81)	100.1 (3.94)	96.8 (3.81)	109.7 (4.32)	984.9 (38.78)
Average precipitation days (≥ 1.0 mm)	16.5	14.3	14.1	11.8	13.2	12.6	13.0	13.1	12.8	15.9	15.5	15.3	168.1
Mean monthly sunshine hours	36.2	64.5	104.1	142.1	181.0	143.4	143.5	133.3	110.7	73.9	46.4	29.7	1,208.8
Source 1: Met Office
Source 2: Starlings Roost Weather

== Gallery ==
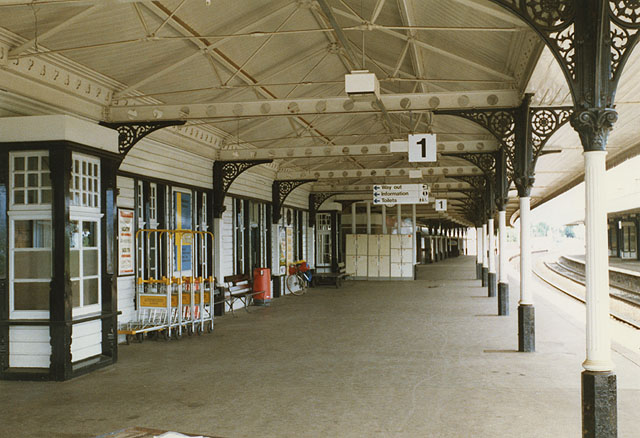
Aviemore railway station

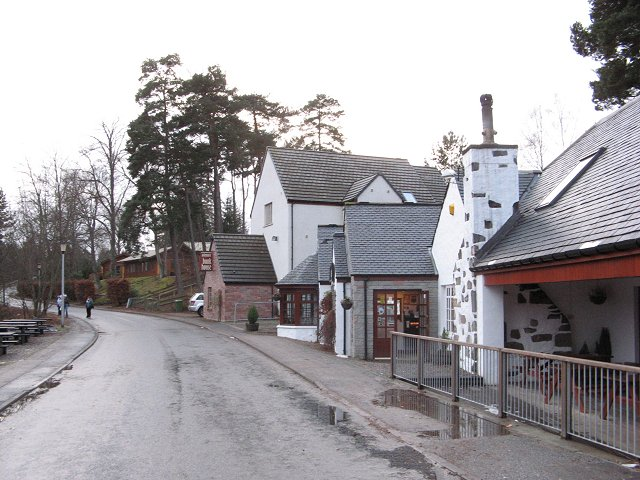
Old Bridge Inn, south Aviemore

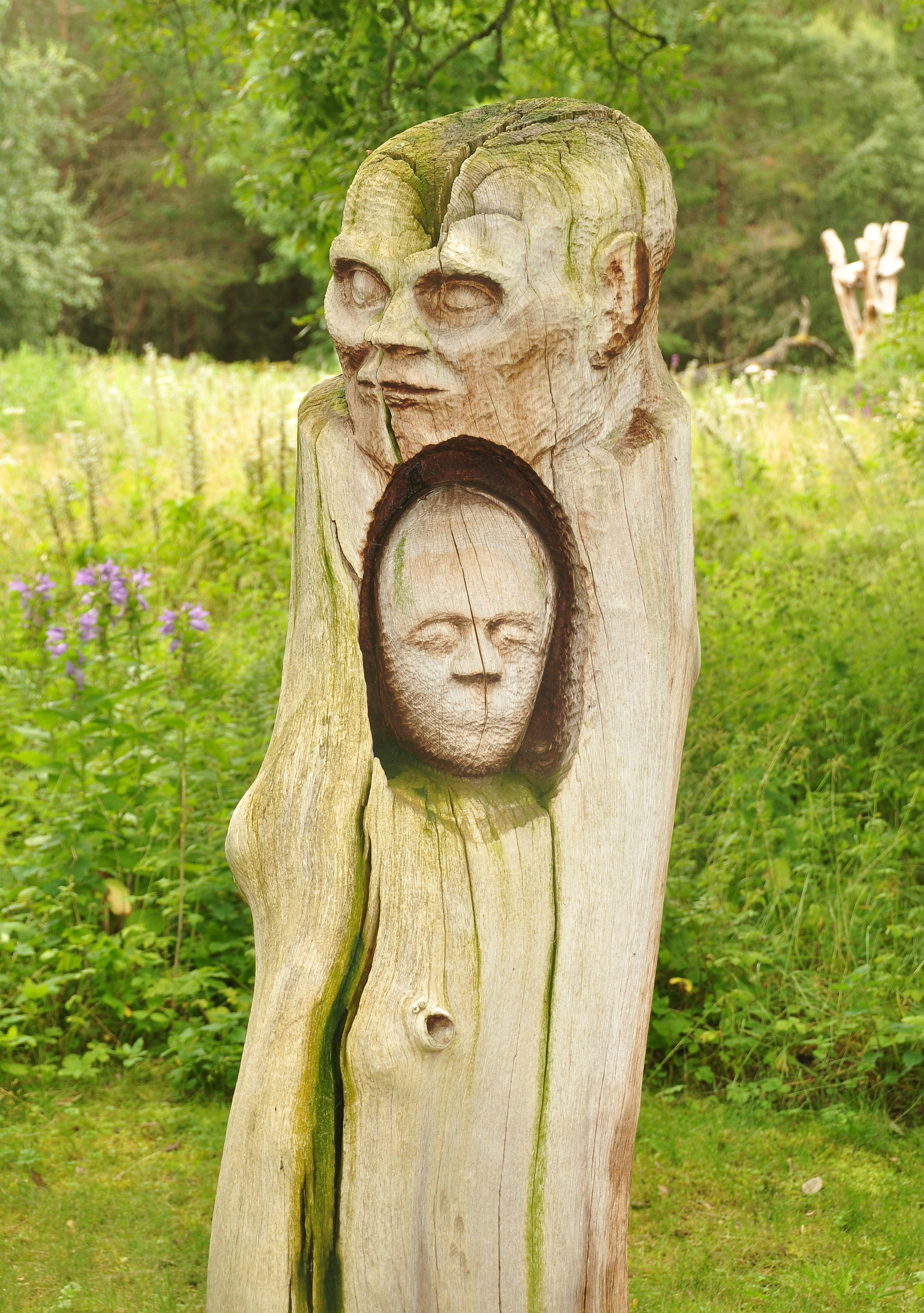
The Inner Man, one of the sculptures in the Frank Bruce Sculpture Park, near Aviemore

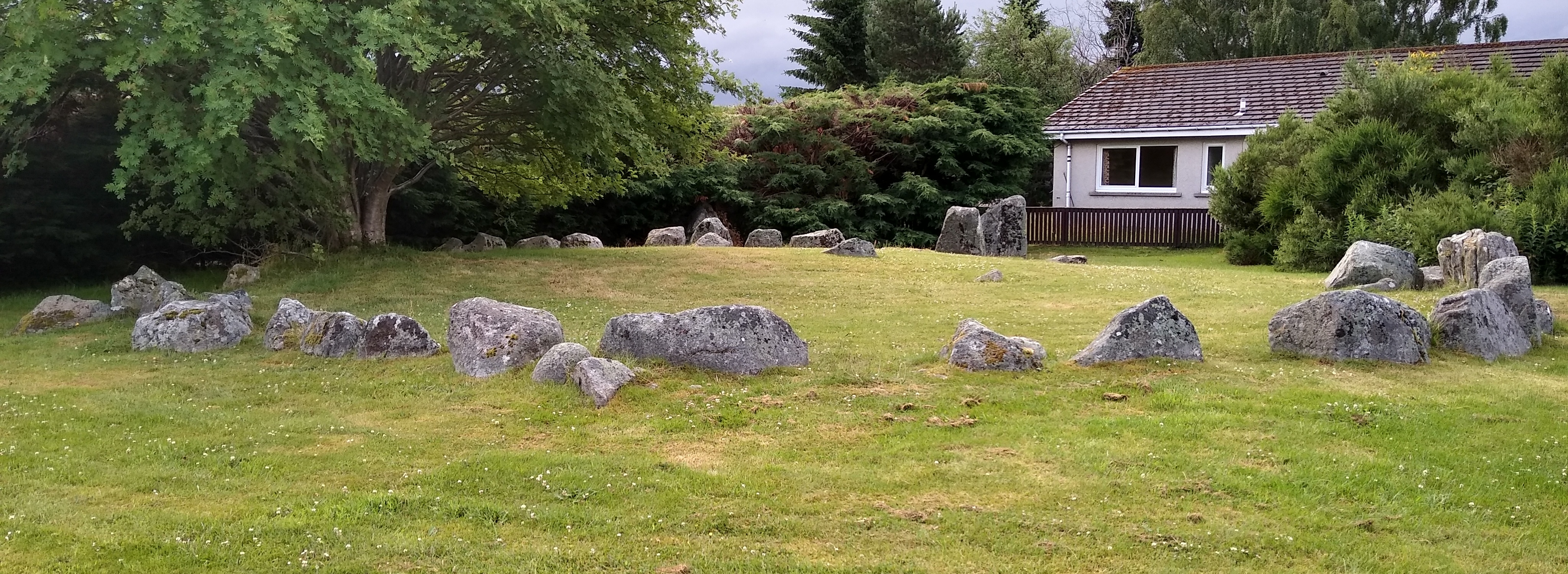
Aviemore stone circle

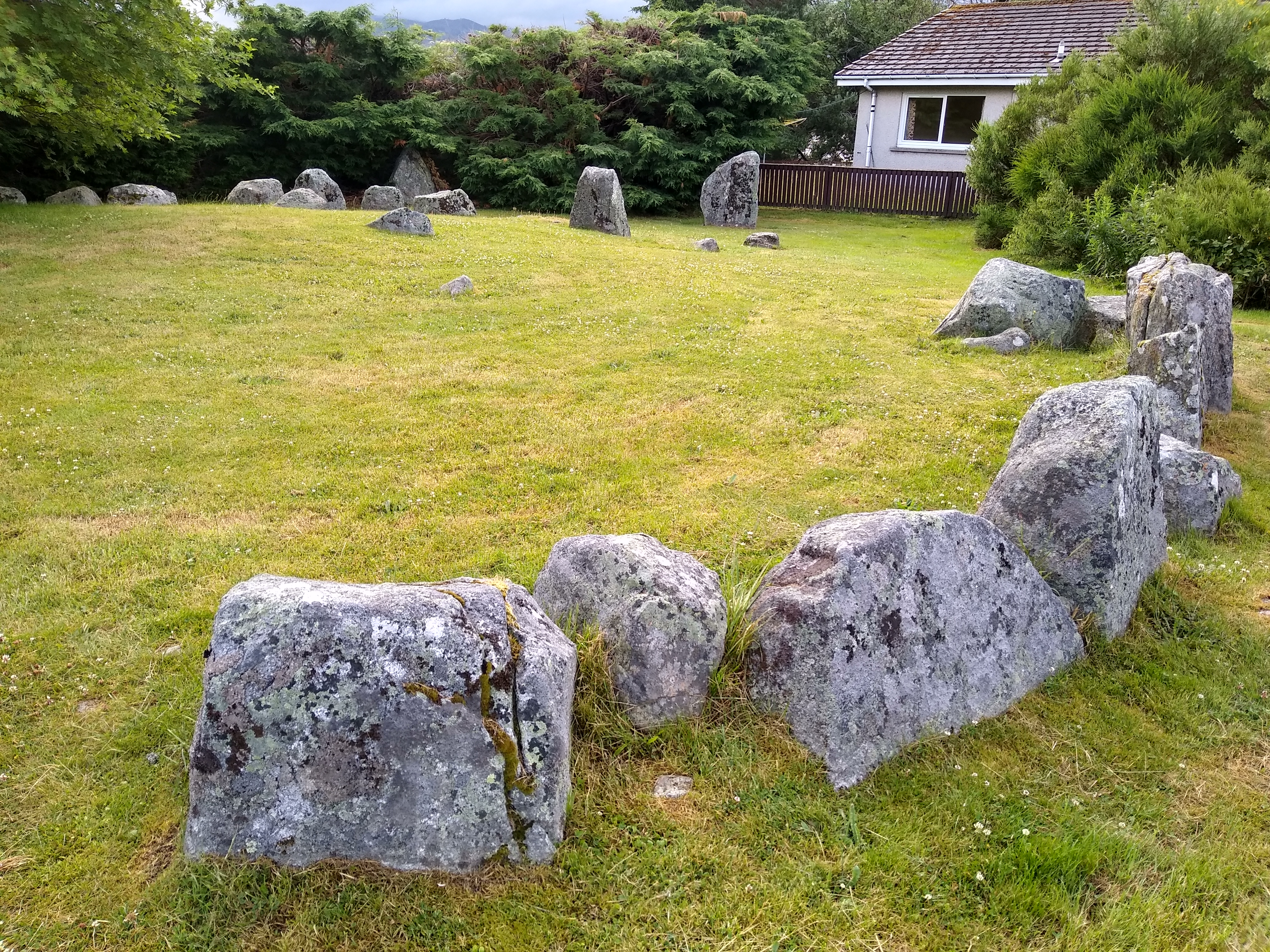
Aviemore stone circle
