= Aviemore railway station =

Railway station in Highland, Scotland

Aviemore Scottish Gaelic: An Aghaidh Mhòr
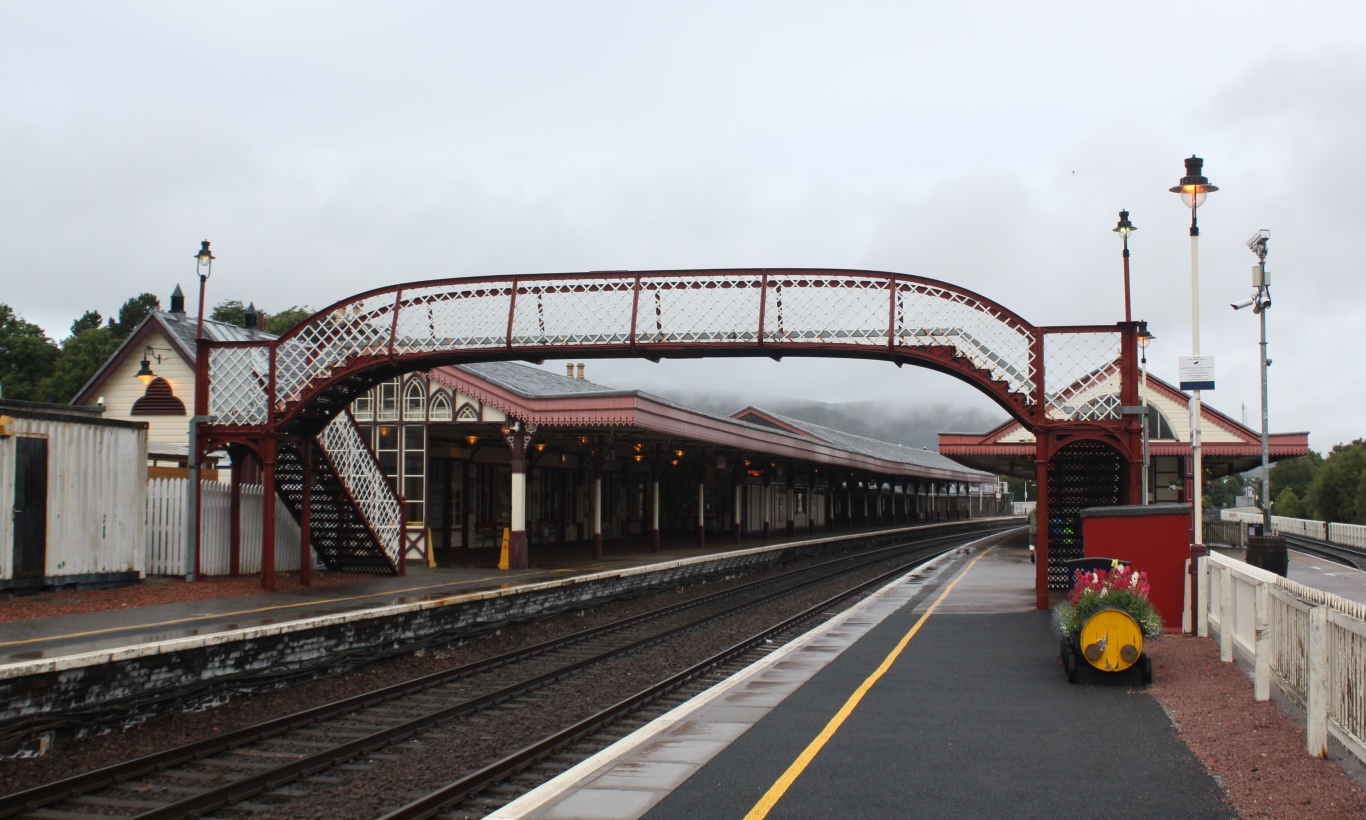
- Aviemore railway station in 2018

General information
- Location: Aviemore, Highland; Scotland
- Coordinates: 57.1886°N 3.8288°W
- Grid reference: NH895123
- Owner: Network Rail
- Manager: ScotRail
- Platforms: 3 (2 National Rail, 1 Strathspey Railway)

Other information
- Station code: AVM

History
- Original company: Inverness & Perth Junction Railway
- Pre-grouping: Highland Railway
- Post-grouping: LMS

Key dates
- 3 August 1863: Station opened

Passengers
- 2020/21: ▼25,492
- Interchange: ▼8
- 2021/22: ▲92,240
- Interchange: ▲147
- 2022/23: ▲0.112 million
- Interchange: ▼69
- 2023/24: ▲0.130 million
- Interchange: ▲79
- 2024/25: ▼0.124 million
- Interchange: ▼60

Listed Building – Category A
- Designated: 18 August 1986
- Reference no.: LB257
Location
Notes
- Passenger statistics from the Office of Rail and Road

Aviemore railway station serves the town and tourist resort of Aviemore in the Highlands of Scotland. The station, which is owned by Network Rail (NR) and managed by ScotRail, is on the Highland Main Line, 83 miles 31 chains (134.2 kilometres) from Perth, between Kingussie and Carrbridge, and is also the southern terminus of the Strathspey preserved railway.

== History ==
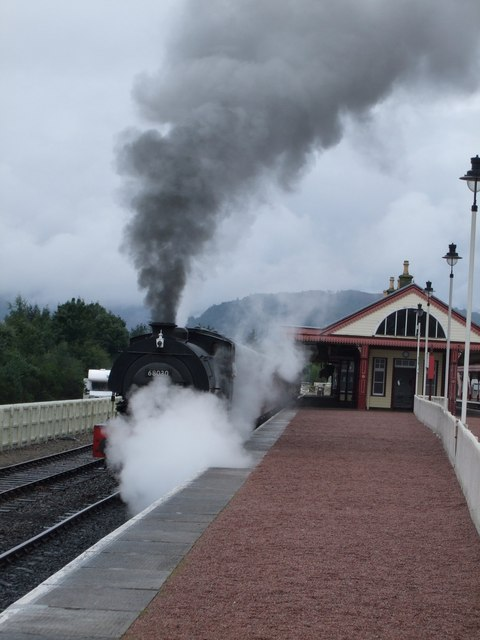
Strathspey railway services have operated from this station since 1998.

The station was opened by the Inverness & Perth Junction Railway (I&PJR) on 3 August 1863, to designs by the engineer William Roberts, when the "direct" line to Inverness via Slochd was built, making Aviemore an important junction.

In 1917 Aviemore was connected to the narrow gauge Aviemore and Coylumbridge Timber Railway. This line closed in 1921.

The original I&PJR line to Forres fell victim to the Beeching cuts, closing to passengers in October 1965.

In 1998 the station was restored and refurbished, and the Strathspey Railway was allowed to use the island platform. Following the moving of services, the Strathspey Railway closed their Aviemore (Speyside) railway station.

=== Accidents and incidents ===
On 29 September 2023, 60103 Flying Scotsman collided with stationary carriages at 6:05pm. Two people were injured.

== Facilities ==
The new building on the northbound platform of the main line comprises a ticket hall, booking office and shop, and the three original buildings are waiting rooms (with historical displays), staff offices, and toilets. Parking is on the station's west side, and passenger access to the Strathspey part of the station is via a foot-crossing across the junction spur. This foot crossing also provides disabled access to platform 2. As there are no ticket machines, if the ticket office is closed, passengers must buy one in advance.

== Platform layout ==
The station has a passing loop 40 chains (800 m) long, flanked by two platforms. Platform 1 on the down (northbound) line can accommodate trains having fourteen coaches, whereas platform 2 on the up (southbound) line can hold fifteen. The junction between the Strathspey Railway and Network Rail lies to the south of the station and was controlled from the station signal box, which also controlled a large portion of the main line either side of here (from Kingussie all the way to Culloden Moor since 1979) as well as the immediate station area. The station was resignalled and the loop extended in 2019, which also saw the signal box closed with control transferring to Inverness.

== Passenger volume ==
Passenger Volume at Aviemore
	2004–05	2005–06	2006–07	2007–08	2008–09	2009–10	2010–11	2011–12	2012–13	2013–14	2014–15	2015–16	2016–17	2017–18	2018–19	2019–20	2020–21	2021–22	2022–23	2023–24	2024–25
Entries and exits	80,977	91,456	101,294	115,431	121,090	124,972	132,336	132,052	136,456	141,311	150,724	152,082	145,200	147,964	138,490	132,618	25,492	92,240	112,090	130,090	123,654
Interchanges	36	58	45	113	86	72	72	14	59	82	37	56	50	44	52	177	8	147	69	79	60

The statistics cover twelve month periods that start in April.

== Services ==
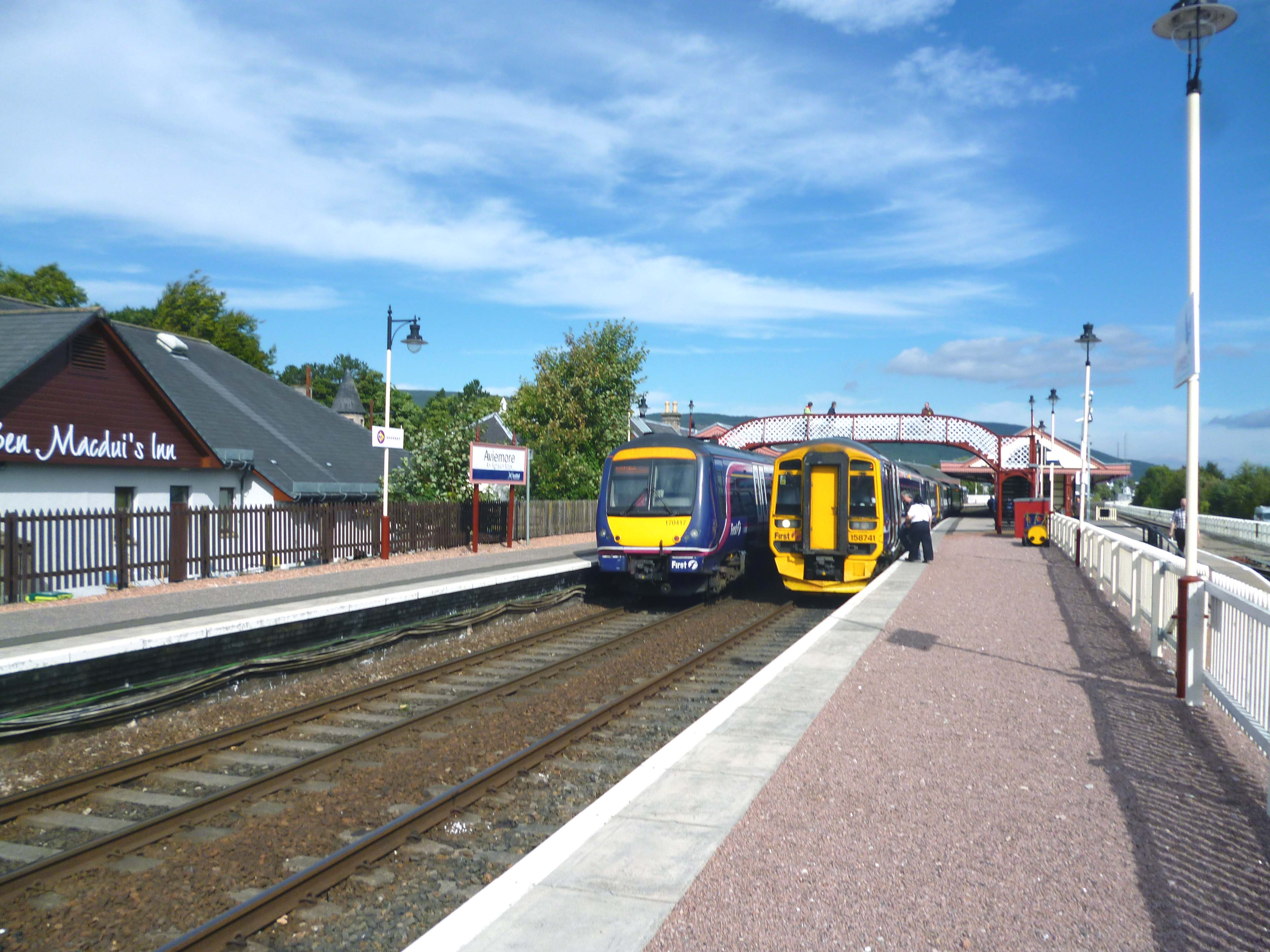
Two First ScotRail services pass at the station

Services are provided by ScotRail, Caledonian Sleeper, and London North Eastern Railway on the Highland Main Line, and Strathspey Railway on the former Inverness & Perth Junction Railway to Boat of Garten and Broomhill.

In the May 2026 timetable, there are six trains each weekday to both Edinburgh Waverley (including the Highland Chieftain to London King's Cross) and Glasgow Queen Street southbound, plus the overnight sleeper to London Euston, six nights per week. Northbound there are twelve departures to Inverness. On Sundays there are five trains to Edinburgh (including the King's Cross service) and two to Glasgow, along with seven to Inverness, two of which extend to Elgin.

Preceding station	National Rail	Following station
Kingussie	ScotRail; Highland Main Line	Carrbridge or Inverness
Kingussie	London North Eastern Railway; East Coast Main Line	Carrbridge or Inverness
Kingussie	Caledonian Sleeper; Highland Caledonian Sleeper	Carrbridge or Inverness
Preceding station	Heritage railways	Following station
Terminus	Strathspey Railway	Boat of Garten towards Broomhill
Historical railways
Kincraig; Line open; station closed	Highland Railway; Inverness & Perth Junction Railway	Boat of Garten; Line and station open
Kincraig; Line open; station closed	Highland Railway; Inverness and Aviemore Direct Railway	Carrbridge; Line and station open

== Future proposals ==
This station is planned to benefit from a package of timetable enhancements introduced by Transport Scotland and Scotrail. The current Perth to Inverness timetable will increase to hourly each way, with trains south of there running on alternate hours to Edinburgh and Glasgow. Journey times will be reduced by 10 minutes to both cities. As of May 2026, this has still not taken place.

== Bibliography ==
- Brailsford, Martyn, ed. (December 2017) [1987]. Railway Track Diagrams 1: Scotland & Isle of Man (6th ed.). Frome: Trackmaps. ISBN 978-0-9549866-9-8.
- Butt, R. V. J. (October 1995). The Directory of Railway Stations: details every public and private passenger station, halt, platform and stopping place, past and present (1st ed.). Sparkford: Patrick Stephens Ltd. ISBN 978-1-85260-508-7. OCLC 60251199. OL 11956311M.
- Quick, Michael (2022). Railway Passenger Stations in Great Britain: A Chronology (PDF) (5th ed.). London: Railway and Canal Historical Society. Archived from the original (PDF) on 15 March 2023.
