= Scheduled monuments in Perth and Kinross =

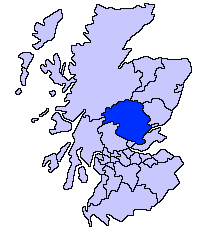
Perth and Kinross shown within Scotland

A scheduled monument in Scotland is a nationally important archaeological site or monument which is given legal protection by being placed on a list (or "schedule") maintained by Historic Environment Scotland. The aim of scheduling is to preserve the country's most significant sites and monuments as far as possible in the form in which they have been inherited.

The process of scheduling is governed by the Ancient Monuments and Archaeological Areas Act 1979, which aims "to make provision for the investigation, preservation and recording of matters of archaeological or historical interest". The term "scheduled monument" can apply to the whole range of archaeological sites which have been deliberately constructed by human activity but are not always visible above ground. They range from prehistoric standing stones and burial sites, through Roman remains and medieval structures such as castles and monasteries, to later structures such as industrial sites and buildings constructed for the World Wars. Some buildings or structures which were both scheduled and listed have had their listing designations removed to reduce the duplication.

In 2017 there were 8238 scheduled monuments in Scotland.

== Notable scheduled monuments in Perth and Kinross ==
Name	Location	Description	Ref No	Image
Arnot Tower	Scotlandwell	Gutted 16th-century tower-house	SM996	
Ardoch Roman Fort	Ardoch	Remains of a complex Roman military site	SM1601	
Coupar Angus Abbey gatehouse	Coupar Angus	Ruined gatehouse to medieval Cistercian abbey	SM1629	
Black Castle of Moulin	Moulin	Ruined castle	SM1636	
Bertha Roman Fort	Redgorton	Traces of former Roman Fort of bank of River Tay	SM2403	
Dundurn Fort	Comrie	Prehistoric Pictish hillfort	SM2885	
Inchaffray Abbey	Madderty	Slight remains of monastic buildings	SM3200	
Croft Moraig Stone Circle	Near Aberfeldy	Prehistoric stone circle	SM5024	
Comrie Castle	Dull	Small defensive keep on the South bank of the River Lyon	SM5507	
Coupar Angus Abbey precincts	Coupar Angus	Subterranean remains of large abbey complex	SM5772	
Abernethy Round Tower and Pictish Stone	Abernethy, Perth and Kinross	Medieval round tower with Pictish symbol stone at base	SM90005	
Balvaird Castle	Abernethy, Perth and Kinross	Ruined 15th-century L-plan tower-house	SM90027	
Burleigh Castle	Orwell	Medieval tower-house	SM90045	
Dunkeld Cathedral	Dunkeld	Nave and tower of ruined medieval cathedral	SM90119	
Huntingtower Castle	Tibbermore	Connected 15th- and 16th-century towers	SM90164	
Kinnoull Church, remains of church and churchyard, Perth	Kinnoull	Remains of a 16th-century church, with monument to George Hay, 1st Earl of Kinnoull	SM6627	
Lochleven Castle	Kinross	Remains of castle on Castle Island in Loch Leven	SM90204	
Tullibardine Chapel	Tullibardine	16th-century chapel	SM90308	
Innerpeffray Collegiate Church	Innerpeffray	Early-16th-century church	SM90170	
Elcho Castle	Perth	Castle	SM90140	

== See also ==
- List of Category A listed buildings in Perth and Kinross
