= Methven railway station =

Railway station in Perth and Kinross, Scotland

Methven

General information
- Location: Methven, Perth and Kinross; Scotland
- Coordinates: 56.4120°N 3.5858°W
- Grid reference: NO022255
- Platforms: 1

Other information
- Status: Disused

History
- Original company: Perth, Almond Valley and Methven Railway
- Pre-grouping: Caledonian Railway
- Post-grouping: London, Midland and Scottish Railway

Key dates
- 1 January 1858: Station opened
- 27 September 1937: Station closed for passengers
- 25 January 1965: closure to goods trains
Location

Methven railway station served the village of Methven, Perth and Kinross, Scotland and was located between the city of Perth to the east and the town of Crieff to its west. It was the western terminus of the Perth, Almond Valley and Methven Railway line and opened on 1 January 1858.

== History ==
In 1866, the line was extended westwards all the way to Crieff by the Crieff and Methven Junction Railway and to the south of Methven, a junction and platform was constructed, named appropriately Methven Junction railway station. This newer stop was renamed 'Methven Junction Halt' on 27 September 1937, coinciding with the closure of Methven Station to passenger traffic. Passenger trains continued running between Perth and Crieff until 1 October 1951, but during their last fourteen years, no longer deviated the short distance north to Methven Station. Goods trains however, did continue to visit the station until complete line closure arrived on 25 January 1965. Nowadays, the site of Methven Station is occupied by a small industrial estate and only the presence of Station Road in the village gives any hint of the railways ever having visited here.

Preceding station	Disused railways	Following station
Methven Junction; Line and station closed	Caledonian Railway; Perth, Almond Valley and Methven Railway	Terminus
