= Almondbank railway station =

Disused railway station in Almondbank, Scotland

Coordinates: 56.40870°N 3.51416°W

Almondbank
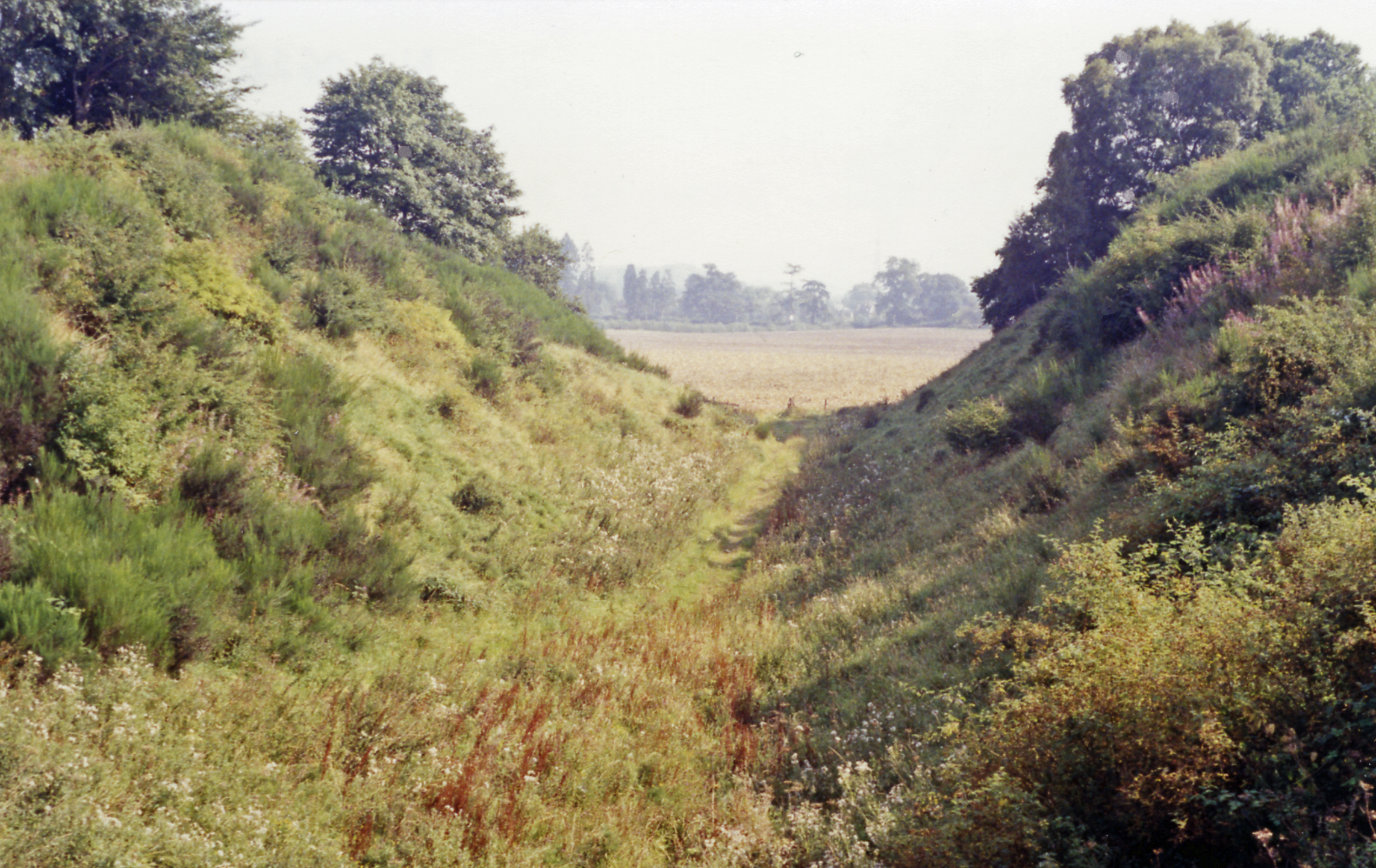
- The former trackbed in 1991

General information
- Location: Almondbank, Perth and Kinross; Scotland
- Platforms: 1

Other information
- Status: Disused

History
- Original company: Perth, Almond Valley and Methven Railway
- Pre-grouping: Caledonian Railway
- Post-grouping: London, Midland and Scottish Railway

Key dates
- 1 January 1858: Station opens
- 1 October 1951: Station closes
Location

Almondbank railway station served the village of Almondbank, in the Scottish county of Perth and Kinross.

== History ==
Opened on 1 January 1858 by the Perth, Almond Valley and Methven Railway, later absorbed by the Caledonian Railway, it became part of the London, Midland and Scottish Railway during the Grouping of 1923. Passing on to the Scottish Region of British Railways on nationalisation in 1948, it was then closed to passenger traffic by the British Railways Board on 1 October 1951. The station remained open to goods traffic, servicing the local Royal Naval Workshops which had its own small branch line, connecting the site to the station. Almondbank Station was finally closed to goods traffic with the closure of the entire Perth to Crieff line on 25 January 1964.

Now a private dwelling house, the former station house is located adjacent to the A85 road bridge over the now filled in course of the railway, but a cutting on the north east side of the bridge is still clearly visible.

| Preceding station | Disused railways | Following station |
|---|---|---|
| Ruthven Road | Perth, Almond Valley and Methven Railway; Caledonian Railway | Tibbermuir |
