= Abercairney railway station =

Disused railway station in Abercairney, Scotland

Abercairny
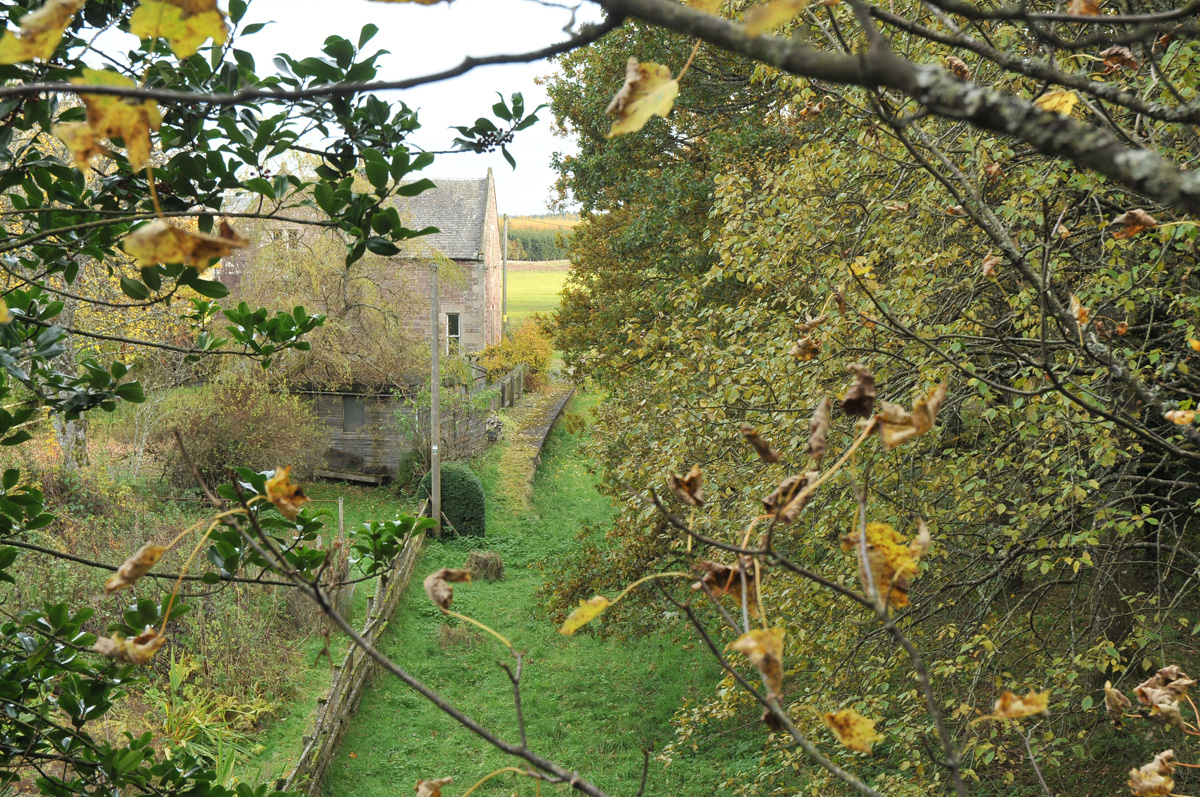
- The station building and former platform in 2012

General information
- Other names: Abbercairny; Abercairney
- Location: Abercairny, Crieff, PH7 3QZ; Abercairney, Perthshire; Scotland
- Coordinates: 56.3689°N 3.7432°W
- Platforms: 1

Other information
- Status: Disused

History
- Opened: 21 May 1866
- Closed: 1 October 1951
- Original company: Crieff and Methven Junction Railway
- Pre-grouping: Caledonian Railway
- Post-grouping: London, Midland and Scottish Railway
Location

Abercairney railway station served the Abercairny estates in the Scottish county of Perth and Kinross.

== History ==
Opened on 21 May 1866 by the Crieff and Methven Junction Railway, then absorbed by the Caledonian Railway, it became part of the London, Midland and Scottish Railway during the Grouping of 1923. Passing on to the Scottish Region of British Railways on nationalisation in 1948, the station was closed to passenger traffic by British Railways on 1 October 1951. The line closed to goods on 11 September 1967.

The former station house, built in 1865, which served the station, was put up for sale in 2023.

Preceding station	Disused railways	Following station
Madderty	Caledonian Railway; Crieff and Methven Junction Railway	Innerpeffray
