= James Drummond, 1st Lord Maderty =

Scottish peer

James Drummond, 1st Lord Maderty (1540?–1623) was a Scottish peer.

== Life ==
Drummond was the second son of David Drummond, 2nd Lord Drummond, by his wife, Lilias, eldest daughter of William, second Lord Ruthven. He was educated with James VI, who throughout his life treated him with favour. On his coming of age his father gave him the lands and titles of the Abbey of Inchaffray in Strathearn, in virtue of which possession he was known as "commendator" of Inchaffray. He also had charters of the baronies of Auchterarder, Kincardine, and Drymen in Perthshire and Stirling, 3 September 1582, and 20 October of the lands of Kirkhill.

In 1580 Drummond was appointed a gentleman of the bedchamber by James VI. He was with the king at Perth 5 August 1600, during the so-called Gowrie conspiracy, and afterwards gave depositions about it. In 1609 (31 January) the king converted the abbey of Inchaffray into a temporal lordship, and made Drummond a peer, with the title of Lord Maderty, the name being that of the parish in which Inchaffray was situated. He had further charters of Easter Craigton in Perthshire, 23 May 1611; of the barony of Auchterarder (to him and his second son), 27 July 1615; and of the barony of Innerpeffray, 24 March 1618.

Drummond died in September 1623. He is Buried in Innerpeffray Chapel attaching the rear of Innerpeffray Library.

== Family ==
He married Jean, daughter of James Chisholm of Cromlix, Perthshire, who through her mother was heiress of Sir John Drummond of Innerpeffray, which property she brought into her husband's family, and by her he had two sons (John, second lord Maderty, and James of Machany) and four daughters, Lilias, Jean, Margaret, and Catherine.

Peerage of Scotland
| New creation | Lord Maderty; 1609–1623 | Succeeded by John Drummond |
