= Innerpeffray railway station =

Disused railway station in Scotland

Innerpeffray

General information
- Location: Millhills, Perthshire; Scotland
- Coordinates: 56.3607°N 3.7898°W
- Platforms: 1

Other information
- Status: Disused

History
- Original company: Crieff and Methven Junction Railway
- Pre-grouping: Caledonian Railway
- Post-grouping: London, Midland and Scottish Railway

Key dates
- 21 May 1866: Opened
- 1 January 1917: Closed
- 1 June 1919: Re-opened
- 1 October 1951: Closed
Location

Innerpeffray railway station served the hamlets of Innerpeffray and Millhills in the Scottish county of Perth and Kinross.

== History ==
Opened on 21 May 1866 by the Crieff and Methven Junction Railway, then by the Caledonian Railway, it became part of the London, Midland and Scottish Railway during the Grouping of 1923. The station closed briefly on 1 January 1917, before reopening again on 1 June 1919. Passing on to the Scottish Region of British Railways on nationalisation in 1948, it was finally closed to passenger and goods traffic by British Railways on 1 October 1951.

Preceding station	Disused railways	Following station
Abercairney	Caledonian Railway; Crieff and Methven Junction Railway	Crieff
