= Balgowan railway station =

Disused railway station in Balgowan, Perthshire

Coordinates: 56.38544°N 3.63595°W

Balgowan
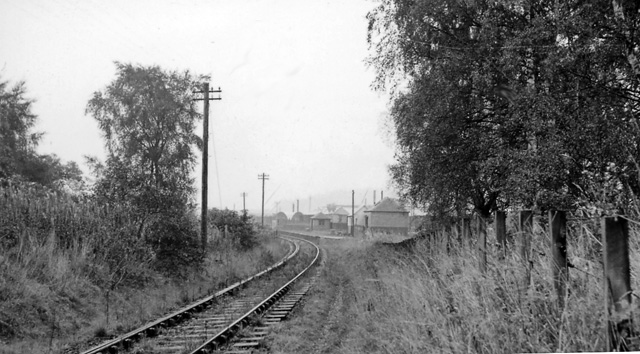
- Balgowan railway station in 1961

General information
- Location: Perthshire; Scotland
- Platforms: 1

Other information
- Status: Disused

History
- Original company: Crieff and Methven Junction Railway
- Pre-grouping: Caledonian Railway
- Post-grouping: London, Midland and Scottish Railway

Key dates
- 21 May 1866: Station opens
- 1 October 1951: Station closes
Location

Balgowan railway station served the village of Balgowan, in the Scottish county of Perth and Kinross.

== History ==
Opened on 21 May 1866 by the Crieff and Methven Junction Railway and then later absorbed by the Caledonian Railway, it became part of the London, Midland and Scottish Railway during the Grouping of 1923. Passing on to the Scottish Region of British Railways on nationalisation in 1948, the station was closed to passenger traffic by the British Railways Board on 1 October 1951.

Preceding station	Disused railways	Following station
Methven Junction	Crieff and Methven Junction Railway; Caledonian Railway	Madderty
