= Ruthven Road railway station =

Disused railway station in Ruthvenfield, Perth and Kinross

Ruthven Road

General information
- Location: Ruthvenfield, Perth and Kinross; Scotland
- Coordinates: 56.4141°N 3.4911°W
- Grid reference: NO081256
- Platforms: 1

Other information
- Status: Disused

History
- Original company: Perth, Almond Valley and Methven Railway
- Pre-grouping: Caledonian Railway
- Post-grouping: London, Midland and Scottish Railway; British Railways (Scottish Region)

Key dates
- May 1859: Opened as Ruthven Road Crossing
- December 1938: Name changed to Ruthven Road
- 1 October 1951: Closed
Location

Ruthven Road railway station served Ruthven House and the village of Ruthvenfield in Perthshire, Scotland, from 1859 to 1951 on the Perth, Almond Valley and Methven Railway.

== History ==
The station opened as Ruthven Road Crossing in May 1859 by the Perth, Almond Valley and Methven Railway. Its name was changed to Ruthven Road in December 1938. It closed on 1 October 1951.

Preceding station	Disused railways	Following station
Perth; Line closed, station open	Perth, Almond Valley and Methven Railway	Almondbank; Line and station closed
