= Stobie =

Stobie may refer to:

- Stobie pole, a kind of power pole common in South Australia
- Adam Stobie, Scottish prisoner in the 17th century
- James Stobie, 18th century factor to John Murray, 4th Duke of Atholl
- William Stobie (1950–2001), Ulster Defence Association (UDA) quartermaster and RUC Special Branch informer
- The Stobies, a South Australian indie rock band.
