= Pow of Inchaffray =

Pow of Inchaffray Pow Water
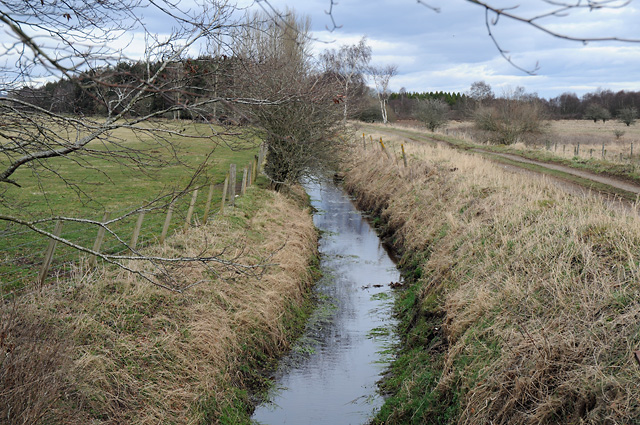
- Upper reaches of the Pow near Balgowan

- Location of the mouth of the Pow within Scotland
- Etymology: "Pow": Scots language for an artificial ditch

Physical characteristics
- Mouth: River Earn
  - coordinates: 56.3467°N 3.7852°W
- Length: 9 miles (14 km)
- Basin size: 2,047 acres (8.28 km^{2})

Basin features
- Population: 79 residential properties, 21 agricultural properties and 2 commercial properties

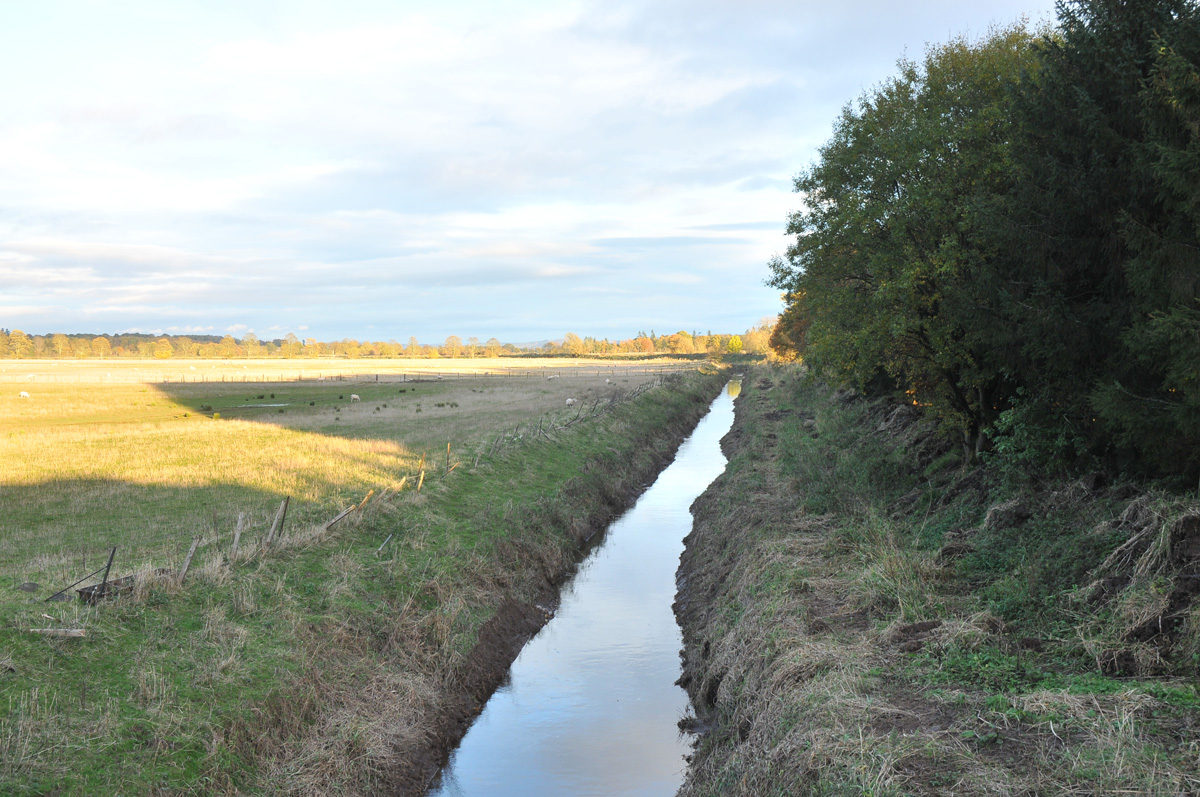
The Pow from Inchaffray Abbey Bridge

The Pow of Inchaffray (also known as the Pow Water) is a drainage ditch in Strathearn, Scotland. It is approximately 9 miles (14 km) long and drains 3.2 square miles (8.3 km^{2}) of fertile agricultural land. The Pow dates back to the Middle Ages and was dug on the orders of the canons of the nearby Inchaffray Abbey; it was expanded under permissions granted by Robert the Bruce. A drainage commission became responsible for the Pow in 1696 under an act of the Parliament of Scotland. This body, the only local drainage commission in Scotland, continues to maintain the Pow and collect revenue from local landowners. A modernised act to govern the commission was passed in 2019.

== Description ==
The Pow starts at Methven Moss and runs in a south-westerly direction for 9 miles (14 km) until it meets the River Earn near to Innerpeffray, about 2.5 miles (4.0 km) to the south-east of Crieff. The Pow's drainage basin is 2,047 acres (828 ha) which includes 79 residential properties, 21 agricultural properties and 2 commercial properties. It has ten major tributaries which total approximately 4.7 miles (7.6 km) of watercourse. The Pow's purpose is disputed with some claiming it to be for the drainage of groundwater and others that it is a flood prevention measure.

== History ==
Pow is a Scots language term that dates to the Early Middle Ages and means an artificial ditch. The Pow was first dug on the orders of the canons of the Augustinian Inchaffray Abbey. The abbey, one of the largest in Scotland at the time, was located on an island in marshland and the Pow was intended to help drain the surroundings. Abbot Maurice of Inchaffray was chaplain to Robert the Bruce and prior to the 1314 Battle of Bannockburn claimed to have witnessed a miracle whereby the arm bone of Saint Fillan appeared in a previously empty reliquary. Robert the Bruce credited the miracle with providing his subsequent victory on the battlefield. In thanks to Maurice he granted the abbey permission to extend the Pow. The abbey went into decline after the Scottish Reformation and was gradually abandoned. Despite this the Pow remained in use.

== Management ==
Pow of Inchaffray Drainage Act 1696
- Act of Parliament
- Parliament of Scotland
- Long title: An Act in favours of the Heritors adjacent to the Pow of Inchaffray.
- Citation: unnumbered

Dates
- Royal assent: 9 October 1696

Pow of Inchaffray Drainage Act 1846
- Act of Parliament
- Parliament of the United Kingdom
- Long title: An Act for repealing an Act of the Parliament of Scotland passed in the Sixth Session of the First Parliament of King William (1696), intituled "An Act in favours of the Heritors adjacent to the Pow of Inchaffray;" and for more effectually draining and improving Lands adjacent to the River or Stream called the Pow of Inchaffray, in the County of Perth.
- Citation: 9 & 10 Vict. c. ccxvi

Dates
- Royal assent: 27 July 1846

In 1696 the Pow was brought under the formal management of a drainage commission (similar to the internal drainage boards of England and Wales) by the "Act in favour of Sir Robert Murray of Abercairney and other heritors upon the Pow of Inchaffray" passed by the Parliament of Scotland. The commission was empowered by the act to tax heritors, those landowners that benefited from the Pow, for the maintenance and improvement of the ditch. It noted that "the grass and corns of several heritors of the said lands are frequently lost and rendered useless". This act was repealed and replaced by the Pow of Inchaffray Drainage Act 1846 (9 & 10 Vict. c. ccxvi) of the Parliament of the United Kingdom which included measures for the construction of new flood defences.

Pow of Inchaffray Drainage Commission (Scotland) Act 2019
- Act of the Scottish Parliament
- Scottish Parliament
- Long title: An Act of the Scottish Parliament to incorporate and reconstitute the Pow of Inchaffray Drainage Commission; to make provision for its functions and for the appointment of Commissioners; to make provision for the calculation of the annual assessments payable by the owners of land benefited by the Pow; to make provision for meetings of the Commissioners and heritors; to make provision for the Commissioners to have access to the Pow over neighbouring land for necessary purposes and for the Commissioners' consent to be required for activities affecting the Pow and adjacent land etc.; and for connected purposes.
- Citation: 2019 asp 2

Dates
- Royal assent: 17 January 2019

Text of statute as originally enacted

Text of the Pow of Inchaffray Drainage Commission (Scotland) Act 2019 as in force today (including any amendments) within the United Kingdom, from legislation.gov.uk.

A private bill, aimed at establishing the commissioners as a body corporate to take into account changes in the size of the drainage basin and to the number of heritors, was submitted to the Scottish Parliament by the drainage commissioners in March 2017 to replace the 1846 act. It received royal assent as the Pow of Inchaffray Drainage Commission (Scotland) Act 2019 (asp 2) on 17 January 2019.

The Pow drainage commission is the only local drainage commission in Scotland. It is responsible for some of the country's most fertile agricultural land and has also worked to allow residential development to take place on part of the drainage basin. The Pow has a population of non-native beavers and the commissioners have been in discussion with Scottish Natural Heritage to carry out a trial of beaver-proof fencing and water-gates.
