= Madderty railway station =

Former railway station in Scotland

Madderty
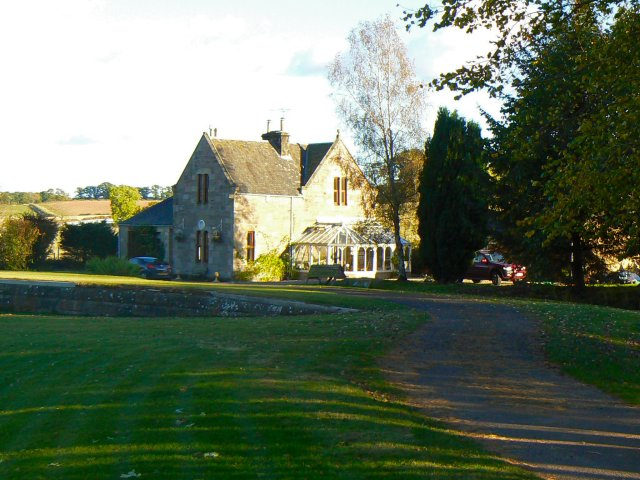
- The station house in 2007

General information
- Location: Madderty, Perthshire; Scotland
- Coordinates: 56.3817°N 3.6928°W
- Platforms: 2

Other information
- Status: Disused

History
- Original company: Crieff and Methven Junction Railway
- Pre-grouping: Caledonian Railway
- Post-grouping: London, Midland and Scottish Railway

Key dates
- 21 May 1866: Opened
- 1 October 1951: Closed
Location

Madderty railway station served the locality of Madderty in Perthshire, Scotland. The village of St. Davids is around one mile to the south.

== History ==
Opened on 21 May 1866 by the Crieff and Methven Junction Railway, then operated by the Caledonian Railway, it became part of the London, Midland and Scottish Railway during the Grouping of 1923. Passing on to the Scottish Region of British Railways on nationalisation in 1948, the station was closed to passenger traffic by British Railways on 1 October 1951.

For several years following closure the Station Master's house was rented out as holiday accommodation in the Summer. It is now a private house.

Preceding station	Disused railways	Following station
Balgowan; Line and station closed	Caledonian Railway; Crieff and Methven Junction Railway	Abercairney; Line and station closed
