= Tibbermuir railway station =

Disused railway station in Tibbermore, Perth and Kinross

Tibbermuir

General information
- Location: Tibbermore, Perth and Kinross; Scotland
- Coordinates: 56.4035°N 3.5421°W
- Grid reference: NO049245
- Platforms: 1

Other information
- Status: Disused

History
- Original company: Scottish North Eastern Railway
- Pre-grouping: Caledonian Railway
- Post-grouping: London, Midland and Scottish Railway; British Railways (Scottish Region)

Key dates
- February 1859: Opened as Tibbermuir Crossing
- 1938: Name changed to Tibbermuir
- 1 October 1951: Closed
Location

Tibbermuir railway station served the village of Tibbermore, Perth and Kinross, Scotland, from 1859 to 1951 on the Perth, Almond Valley and Methven Railway.

== History ==
The station opened as Tibbermuir Crossing in February 1859 by the Scottish North Eastern Railway. To the south was a siding which had a loading bank and was later looped. The station's name was changed to Tibbermuir in 1938. It closed on 1 October 1951.

Preceding station	Historical railways	Following station
Almondbank; Line and station closed	Scottish North Eastern Railway; Perth, Almond Valley and Methven Railway	Methven Junction; Line and station closed
