= Innerpeffray Collegiate Church =

Former collegiate church in Scotland

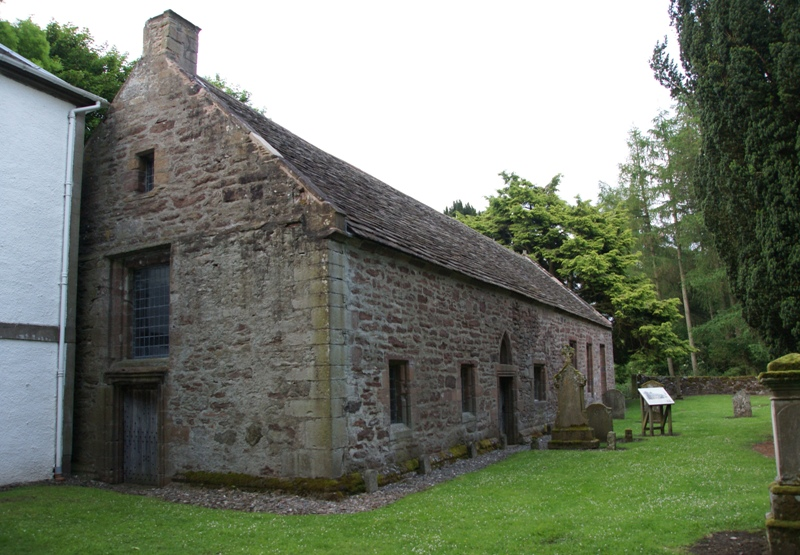
- The building in 2009
- Innerpeffray Collegiate Church
- 56°20′41″N 3°46′41″W
- Location: Innerpeffray, Perth and Kinross
- Country: Scotland

Architecture
- Completed: 1508; 518 years ago

Innerpeffray Collegiate Church is an ancient church building in Innerpeffray, Perth and Kinross, Scotland. Dating to 1508, it is now a scheduled monument. The building is a simple rectangle in plan, which was formerly divided with screens. At the west end is a laird's loft - a gallery in which the laird could sit in comfort while attending services - which postdates the Reformation. Despite its collegiate use ending at the Reformation, the building continued to serve for burials, and to house Innerpeffray Library, founded by Lord Madderty in 1691 as the first lending library in Scotland. The library moved into a new building in 1752.

== See also ==
- Scheduled monuments in Perth and Kinross
