= Robert Rintoul =

British journalist

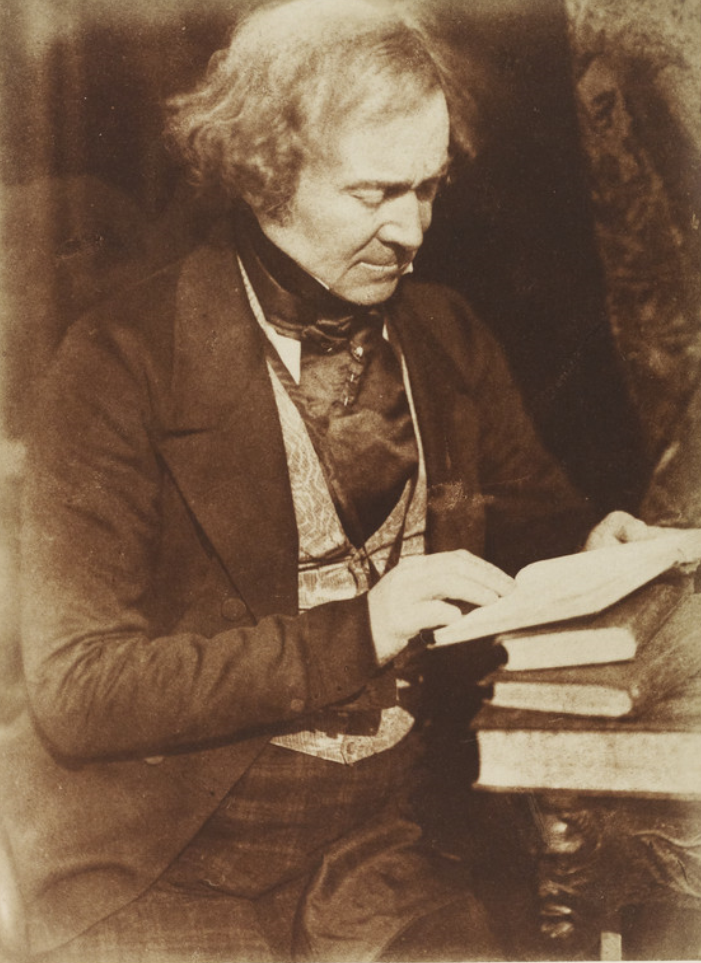
- Robert Rintoul by David Octavius Hill
- Born: Robert Stephen Rintoul; 12 January 1787; Tibbermore, Perthshire, Scotland
- Died: 22 April 1858 (aged 71)
- Occupation: Journalist

Robert Stephen Rintoul (12 January 1787 – 22 April 1858) was a Scottish journalist and campaigner for political reform.

== Life ==
He was born at Tibbermore, Perthshire, Scotland in 1787, and educated at the Aberdalgie parish school. After serving his apprenticeship to the printing trade he became the printer and subsequently the editor of the Dundee Advertiser.

In 1808, in his first year in Dundee, he came into conflict with the Provost of Dundee, Alexander Riddoch, and together with George Kinloch began a local radical movement. In 1819 he was invited to London with Riddoch as part of a parliamentary debate on the Burgh Reform Act.

In 1811 he was promoted from printer to printer and editor of The Advertiser. He stepped down from these roles in February 1825.

In 1826 he went to London where he was editor of The Atlas before, in July 1828 with the assistance of friends, founding The Spectator. In this publication Rintoul strongly supported the Reform Bill, and to him was due the catchphrase "The bill, the whole bill, and nothing but the bill".

After publishing and managing the affairs of The Spectator for more than thirty years, he sold it in February 1858.

He died in London on 22 April 1858 and was buried on the western side of Highgate Cemetery.
