= Methven Junction railway station =

Former railway station in Scotland

Coordinates: 56.4015°N 3.5763°W

Methven Junction railway station opened in 1866, following the extension of the already existing Perth, Almond Valley and Methven Railway line which terminated in the village of Methven to the north. This new line, operated by the Crieff and Methven Junction Railway continued westwards from this junction through Balgowan, Madderty, Abercairney, Innerpeffray and finally, Crieff. Following the closure of Methven Station on 27 September 1937, Methven Junction was renamed 'Methven Junction Halt' until its own closure as a passenger station on 1 October 1951.

Preceding station	Disused railways	Following station
Balgowan; Line and station closed	Perth, Almond Valley and Methven Railway; Caledonian Railway	Methven; Line and station closed
Balgowan; Line and station closed	Crieff and Methven Junction Railway; Caledonian Railway	Tibbermuir; Line and station closed

== See also ==
- List of closed railway stations in Britain
