= List of listed buildings in Tibbermore =

This is a list of listed buildings in the parish of Tibbermore in Perth and Kinross, Scotland.

== List ==
| Name | Location | Date Listed | Grid Ref. (Note: Sometimes known as OSGB36, the grid reference (where provided) is based on the British national grid reference system used by the Ordnance Survey. • "Guide to National Grid". Ordnance Survey. • "Get-a-map". Ordnance Survey.) | Geo-coordinates | Notes | LB Number (Note: Historic Environment Scotland assign a unique alphanumeric identifier to each designated site in Scotland, for listed buildings this always begins with "LB", for example "LB12345".) | Image |
|---|---|---|---|---|---|---|---|
| Manse Of Tibbermore | | | | 56°23′34″N 3°32′13″W | Category B | 18299 | Upload Photo |
| North Blackruthven | | | | 56°24′09″N 3°31′00″W | Category B | 18302 | Upload Photo |
| Low's Work Cottages | | | | 56°24′49″N 3°30′33″W | Category B | 18305 | Upload Photo |
| Dupplin Icehouse | | | | 56°22′05″N 3°33′51″W | Category C(S) | 18300 | Upload Photo |
| Huntingtowerfield, S. Front Section Of Bleachwork | | | | 56°24′53″N 3°30′18″W | Category B | 18306 | Upload Photo |
| Waterside Cottages, Huntingtowerfield | | | | 56°24′59″N 3°29′55″W | Category B | 18307 | Upload Photo |
| West Mains Of Huntingtower Farmhouse | | | | 56°24′14″N 3°30′05″W | Category B | 18313 | Upload Photo |
| Ruthven House Garden Wall And Lodge | | | | 56°24′47″N 3°29′30″W | Category B | 18310 | Upload Photo |
| Newhouse Farmhouse | | | | 56°24′08″N 3°29′20″W | Category B | 18312 | Upload Photo |
| Newhouse Steading | | | | 56°24′08″N 3°29′20″W | Category C(S) | 19872 | Upload Photo |
| Huntingtower Castle | | | | 56°24′34″N 3°29′18″W | 15th-century tower extended in 16th and 17th centuries | 18311 | Upload another image |
| Huntingtowerfield, Former Printhouse And Works Chapel With Linking Wall | | | | 56°24′51″N 3°30′15″W | Category B | 19871 | Upload Photo |
| Tibbermore Parish Church Graveyard | | | | 56°23′35″N 3°32′17″W | Category C(S) | 18298 | Upload Photo |
| Low's Work Weir | | | | 56°24′51″N 3°30′33″W | Category B | 18304 | Upload Photo |
| Ruthven House | | | | 56°24′48″N 3°29′28″W | Category B | 18309 | Upload Photo |
| North Blackruthven Lodge | | | | 56°24′14″N 3°30′52″W | Category B | 18303 | Upload Photo |
| Tibbermore Parish Church | | | | 56°23′36″N 3°32′14″W | Category B | 18297 | Upload Photo |
| Tofthouses | | | | 56°24′32″N 3°30′40″W | Category B | 18301 | Upload Photo |
| Grey Row, Ruthven | | | | 56°24′42″N 3°29′43″W | Category C(S) | 18308 | Upload Photo |

== Key ==
The scheme for classifying buildings in Scotland is:

- Category A: "buildings of national or international importance, either architectural or historic; or fine, little-altered examples of some particular period, style or building type."
- Category B: "buildings of regional or more than local importance; or major examples of some particular period, style or building type, which may have been altered."
- Category C: "buildings of local importance; lesser examples of any period, style, or building type, as originally constructed or moderately altered; and simple traditional buildings which group well with other listed buildings."

In March 2016 there were 47,288 listed buildings in Scotland. Of these, 8% were Category A, and 50% were Category B, with the remaining 42% being Category C.
