= Pitcairngreen =

Coordinates: 56.4264°N 3.5178°W

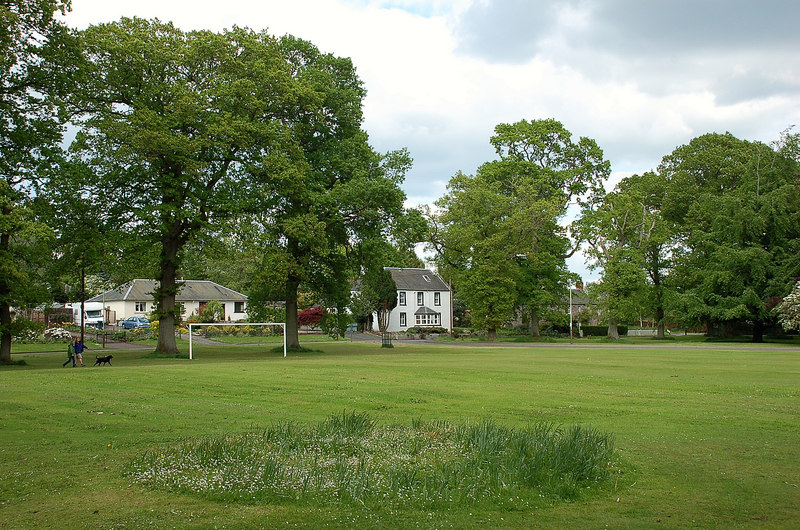

- Location within Perth and Kinross
- OS grid reference: NO064271
- Council area: Perth and Kinross
- Lieutenancy area: Perth and Kinross
- Country: Scotland
- Sovereign state: United Kingdom
- Post town: PERTH
- Postcode district: PH1
- Dialling code: 01738
- Police: Scotland
- Fire: Scottish
- Ambulance: Scottish
- UK Parliament: Ochil & South Perthshire
- Scottish Parliament: North Tayside; North East Scotland

Pitcairngreen (pronounced 'Pit-cairn Green') is a hamlet in the Scottish council area of Perth and Kinross which is more or less adjoined to the much larger village of Almondbank. It lies 4 miles (6 kilometres) northwest of Perth. As its name would suggest, two features of the settlement are a green and a cairn.

In the 18th century the nearby River Almond was used to power textile mills and the local nobleman Lord Lynedoch created the village to provide housing for mill workers. The village's layout was designed in 1786 to have a green at the centre of it by James Stobie, a factor to John Murray, the 4th Duke of Atholl. The presence of a village green is unusual for a Scottish village as these are more commonly associated with traditional English villages. Stobie designed Pitcairngreen to be an industrial textile manufacturing village for Thomas Graham, a textile manufacturer. Its rivalry with the Manchester textile factories is set out in the poem "The Scottish Village, or Pitcairngreen" by Hannah Cowley which starts with the lines:

"Go Manchester and weep thy slighted loom
its arts are cherished now in Pitcairne Green."

There is a prehistoric burial cairn to the north-east of the village which is made from boulders from the River Almond.

== Amenities ==
The village has a pub called the Pitcairngreen Inn, a village hall and a green around which the village is built. Originally intended for industrial purposes, such as bleaching, the green now features impressive stands of oak and beech trees, as well as play facilities for the local children.
