= Tibbermore =

Coordinates: 56.396°N 3.540°W

Tibbermore: Scottish Gaelic: An Tiobar Mòr; Scots: Tibbermore
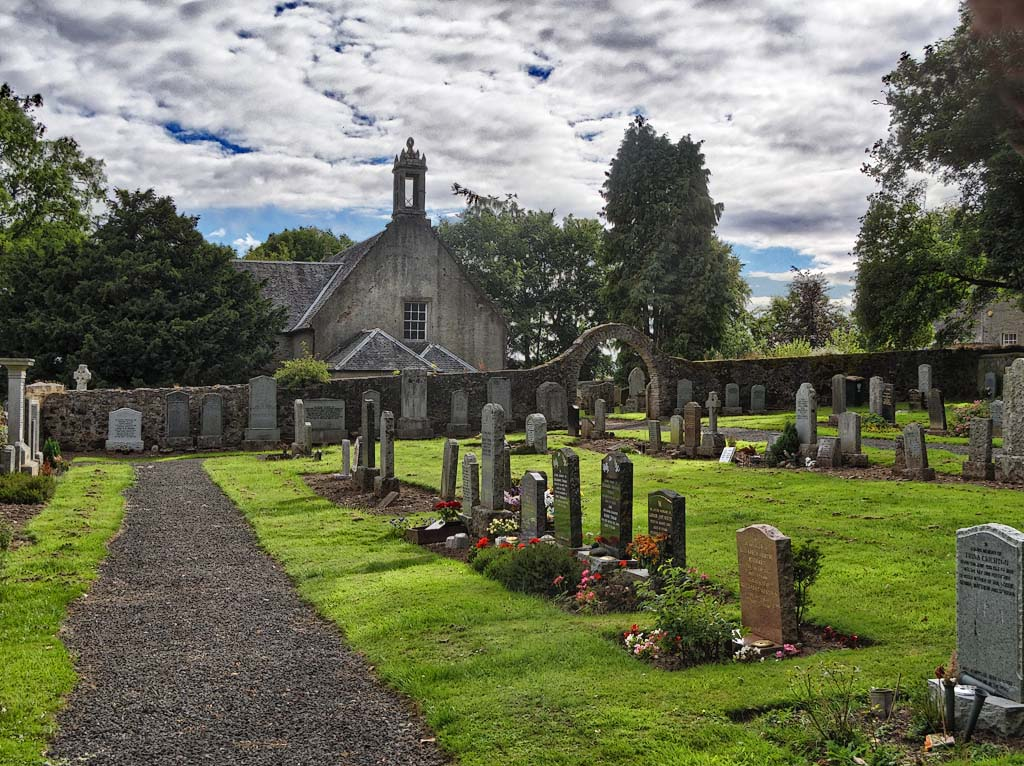
- Tibbermore Church and churchyard

- Location within Perth and Kinross
- Population: 157
- Language: Scots; English
- OS grid reference: NO 0504 2370
- Council area: Perth and Kinross
- Country: Scotland
- Sovereign state: United Kingdom
- Post town: PERTH
- Postcode district: PH1
- Dialling code: 01738
- Police: Scotland
- Fire: Scottish
- Ambulance: Scottish

Tibbermore is a small village situated about 4 miles (6 kilometres) west of Perth, Scotland. The parish extends to Aberuthven.

Previously known as Tippermuir, it was the site of the Battle of Tippermuir in 1644, between the Marquis of Montrose's army and an army of Covenanters.

The church building, dating from 1632 and enlarged in 1789 is in a poor state of repair. Restoration was being considered in 2007. The church building is now only used occasionally for weddings and funerals.

In 2014, the church was used as the location of a witch trial for filming Season 1 of the TV show Outlander.

Tibbermore has several listed buildings.

== Public transport ==
Tibbermuir railway station served the village of Tibbermore from 1859 to 1951 on the Perth, Almond Valley and Methven Railway.

Docherty Midland Coaches' route 155 service was withdrawn in July 2023 (during Scottish Bus Week) due to a decline in usage. This left residents of Tibbermore with no bus service.

== Notable people ==
- Robert Rintoul (1787–1858), reformer, journalist and founder of The Spectator
