= Almondbank =

Coordinates: 56°25′16″N 3°31′01″W

Almondbank: Scottish Gaelic: Bruach Amain
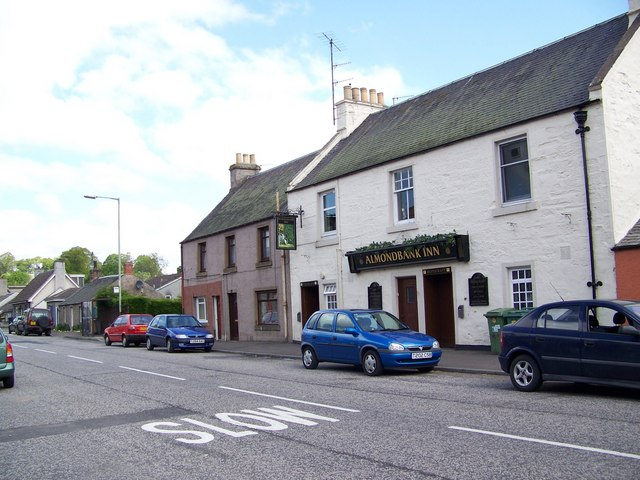

- Location within Perth and Kinross
- Population: 1,370 (2020)
- OS grid reference: NO0626
- Council area: Perth and Kinross
- Country: Scotland
- Sovereign state: United Kingdom
- Post town: PERTH
- Postcode district: PH1
- Dialling code: 01738
- Police: Scotland
- Fire: Scottish
- Ambulance: Scottish
- UK Parliament: Perth and Kinross-shire
- Scottish Parliament: Perthshire North

Almondbank is a village in Perth and Kinross, Scotland, about 4 1/2 miles (7 kilometres) northwest of Perth. It is part of the Strathtay Ward in Perth & Kinross Council.

== RNAS Almondbank ==
With the building of Royal Naval Aircraft Workshops, Almondbank grew significantly during and after the Second World War. The establishment of Royal Naval Aircraft Workshops commenced in 1940. The station, a stone frigate, was employed as a RNAS Aircraft Repair Yard and Stores Depot. The workshops had their own small railway branch line which was linked to the now-closed Almondbank railway station.

== StandardAero Facility ==
The Defence Aviation Repair Agency (DARA) site at Almondbank was a major employer in the community for many years providing essential support to the British Armed Forces. The Decision by the UK government in early 2008 to take the site (and its counterpart at Fleetlands, Gosport) out of direct MOD control by doing a conditional sell-off to Canadian firm Vector Aerospace was a controversial one and there were concerns about the future of the site. In 2011, Vector Aerospace was taken over by Eurocopter (now Airbus) who operated the Almondbank site for seven years. In 2018, StandardAero Aviation Holdings, Inc. and Airbus SE announced that they have finalized the acquisition by StandardAero of Vector Aerospace Holding SAS from Airbus.

== School, church and community ==
The village of Almondbank is often seen as including the attached hamlets of Pitcairngreen and Lochty, and the wider area is sometimes called Almondvalley. There is one school serving the area, Pitcairn Primary, which opened in 1939 and replaced older schools. The school is located in the northernmost housing development of the village, sometimes referred to as Bridgeton, even although there is no signage in recognition of this and the area remains part of Almondbank itself (as opposed to Pitcairngreen and Lochty). Next to the school lies the only shop in the village and directly opposite this is the church, which is known as Almondbank/Tibbermore (St Serf's). Another area of the village is known as College Mill, which borders the River Almond, the river that gives the village its name. A housing development constructed in the 1990s at the southern end of the village was known for many years as "Bett Homes", named after the site developers. This area encompasses Admiralty Wood and MacKenzie Drive, the majority of houses in the latter being 'affordable homes'. Around the same time these houses were being built, a much smaller development in the Lochty area was built by the local construction firm, GS Brown.

Almondbank is close to another Perthshire village, Methven.
