= James Stobie =

- Occupation: Factor to the 4th Duke of Atholl
- Years active: Late 18th century

James Stobie was the factor to John Murray, the 4th Duke of Atholl, in the late 18th century. He is best known for designing the layout of Perthshire villages on the bequest of the Murray. In 1784, he designed the village of Stanley and in 1786 he designed the layout of Pitcairngreen.
