= Methven, Perth and Kinross =

Village in Perth and Kinross, Scotland

Coordinates: 56.415°N 3.580°W

Methven: Scottish Gaelic: Meadhainnigh; Scots: Meffin
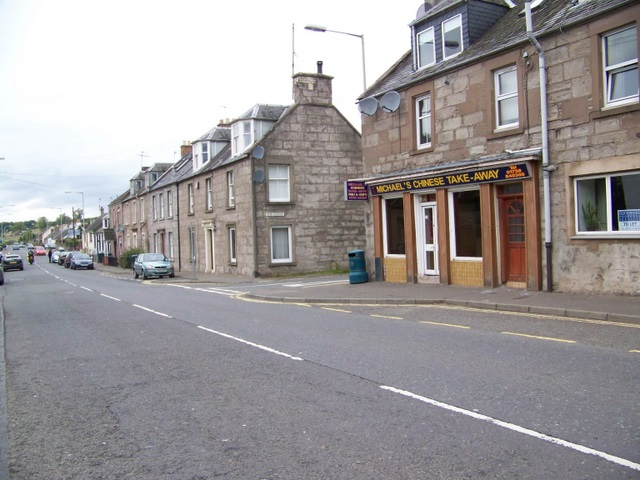
- Methven

- Location within Perth and Kinross
- Population: 1,300 (2020)
- OS grid reference: NO025259
- Council area: Perth and Kinross
- Lieutenancy area: Perth and Kinross
- Country: Scotland
- Sovereign state: United Kingdom
- Post town: PERTH
- Postcode district: PH1
- Dialling code: 01738
- Police: Scotland
- Fire: Scottish
- Ambulance: Scottish
- UK Parliament: Perth and Kinross-shire
- Scottish Parliament: Perthshire South and Kinross-shire

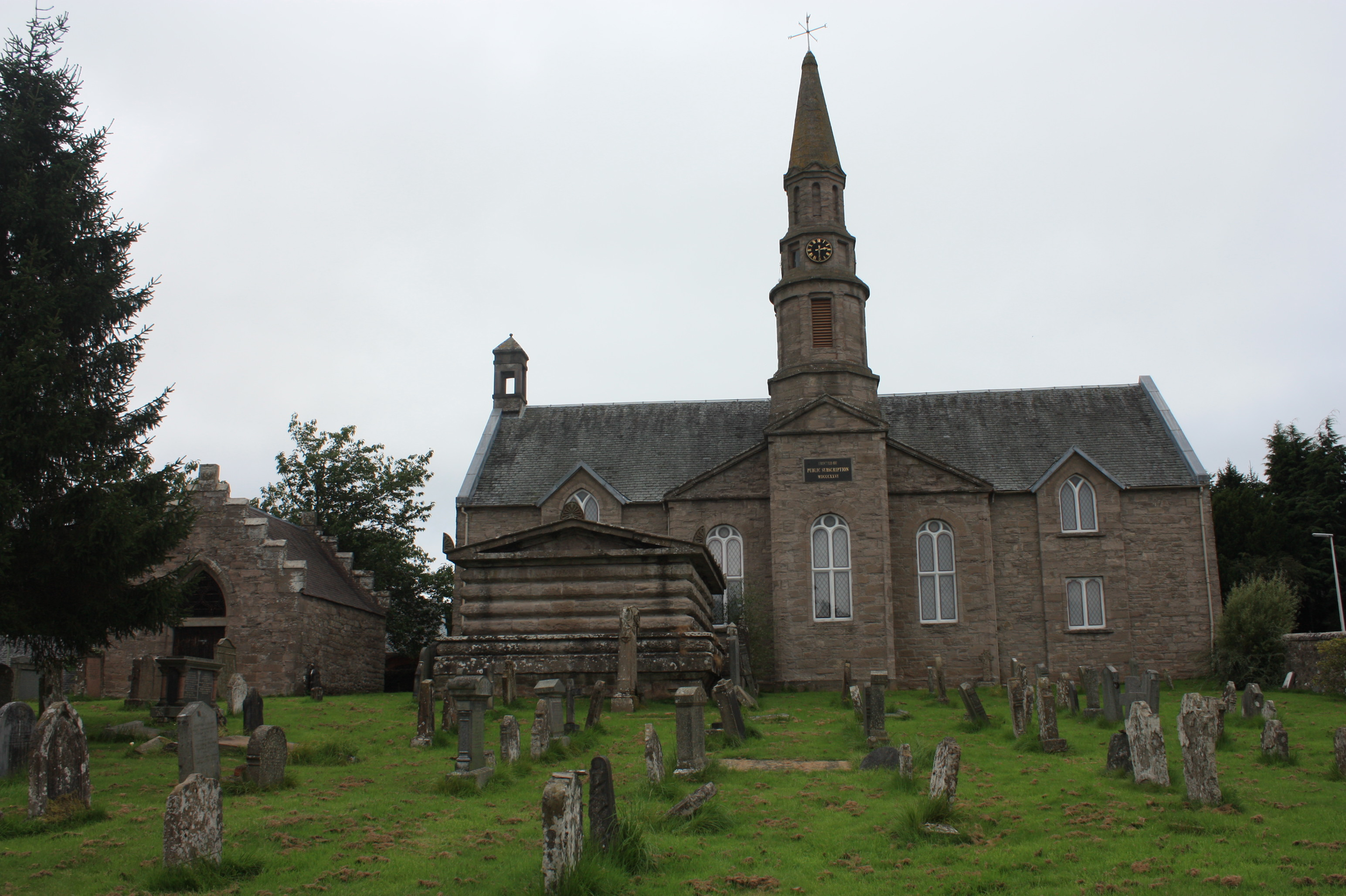
Methven Church and churchyard

Methven (/ˈmɛvɪn/; Scottish Gaelic: Meadhainnigh) is a large village in the Scottish region of Perth and Kinross, on the A85 road due west of the city of Perth. It is near the village of Almondbank. The village has its own primary school, church, bowling club, community halls, playing field with sports facilities and skate-park, and a variety of businesses.

There is a local primary school in the village, and a large co-educational boarding and day independent school nearby, called Glenalmond College, described by The Good Schools Guide as providing an "outstanding" quality of education.

== Etymology ==
A Brittonic name, Methven is thought to be derived from words equivalent to Welsh medd "mead", and maen (in this case, mutated to faen) "stone".

== Businesses ==
To the south of the village, along Station Road, a small industrial estate occupies the former site of Methven Station. Closed since 27 September 1937, the station was originally the western terminus of the Perth, Almond Valley and Methven Railway.

Strathearn distillery, a single malt Scotch whisky distillery is located to the south-west of the village.

== Local Issues ==
Work began on a new pedestrian crossing in the village in 2008, but was slow to progress, with it not completed until August 2009. Locals had campaigned for a crossing for years because of the busy main road that cuts through the village. The work to install it (as well as nearby works to upgrade the gas pipe network in the village) caused some disruption.

== History and legacy ==
The Battle of Methven took place in 1306, when Scottish forces (led by newly crowned King Robert the Bruce) were ambushed by English forces (led by Aymer de Valence, 2nd Earl of Pembroke), resulting in a victory for the English. This was part of the Scottish Wars of Independence, in which the Scots eventually vanquished the English invaders and restored the nation’s independence.

There used to be a Royal Air Force station nearby called RAF Methven.

Smiddy House, at 42–44 Main Street, was built around 1840. It is now considered at-risk due to its condition.

== Notable people ==
Very Rev Dr James Oswald was minister of Methven from 1750 to 1783. He served as Moderator of the General Assembly of the Church of Scotland in 1765.

Dr William Marshall born 26 Aug 1834 in Methven was appointed Queen Victoria's resident doctor at Balmoral in 1871. He was a royal physician until 1881. He died in Crieff on 22 Dec 1884. A note of his Royal service is made on his headstone erected by his father and in the Methven cemetery.

Sir Thomas Graham, 1st Baron Lynedoch, a military hero, was born and raised at the family home of Balgowan House in the area and is buried in the large stone vault south of the main church.

Methven is the birthplace of the Reverend Dr Robert Stirling, inventor of the Stirling engine and of the banker Sir Alexander Kemp Wright.

== See also ==
- Methven Castle
