= Balgowan, Perth and Kinross =

Coordinates: 56.385582°N 3.633183°W

Balgowan
- Location within Perth and Kinross
- Language: Scots; English
- Council area: Perth and Kinross
- Country: Scotland
- Sovereign state: United Kingdom
- Post town: PERTH
- Postcode district: PH1
- Dialling code: 01738
- Police: Scotland
- Fire: Scottish
- Ambulance: Scottish

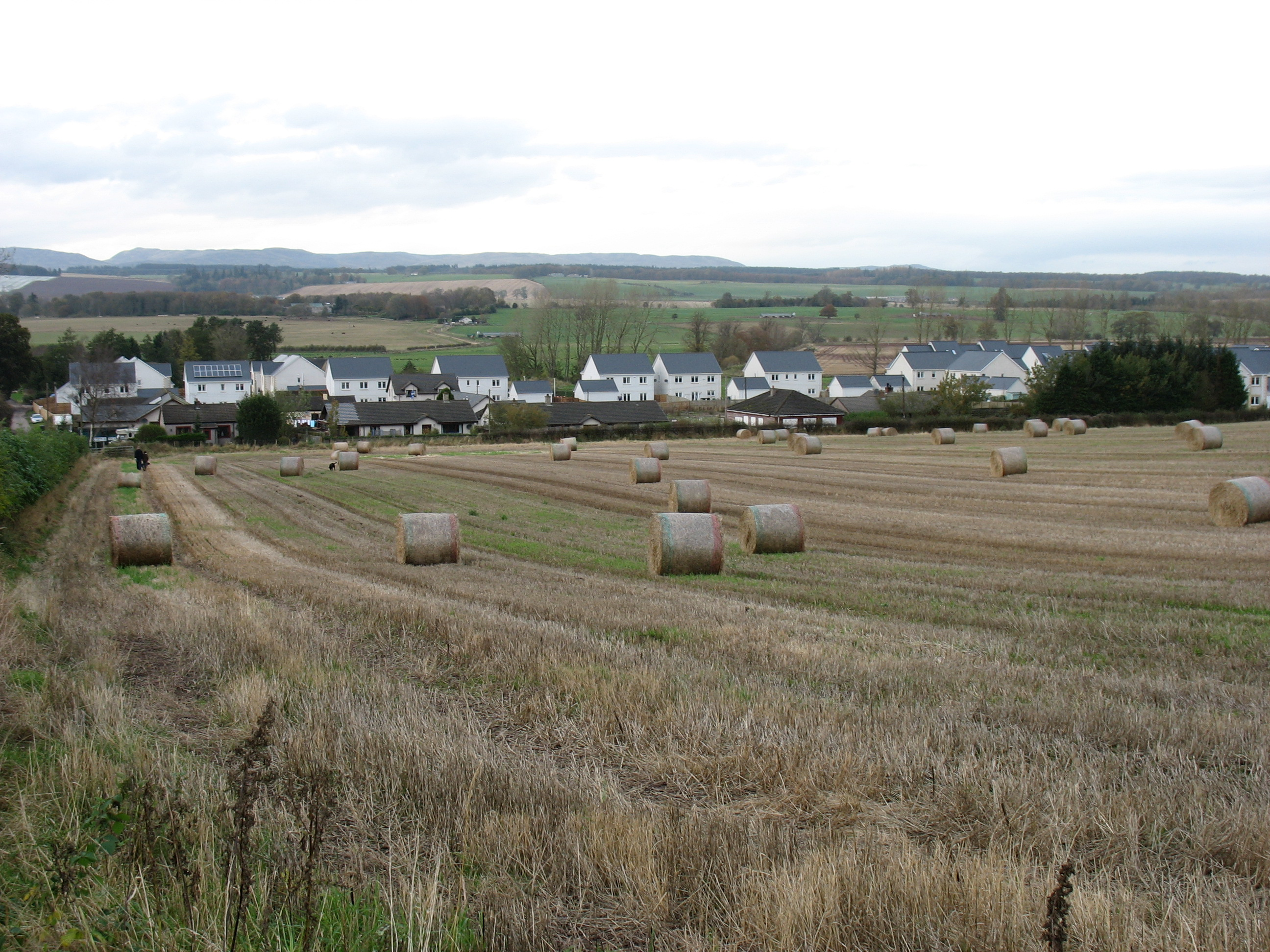
Balgowan, Perth and Kinross

Balgowan is a village in Perth and Kinross, Scotland, approximately 5 miles (8 kilometres) west of Perth. The village is located near the junctions of Pow Water, Jessie Burn and Cowgask Burn.

== Public transport ==
Balgowan railway station served the village between 1866 and 1951.

Docherty Midland Coaches' route 155 service was withdrawn in July 2023 (during Scottish Bus Week) due to a decline in usage.

== Sawmill ==
For many years, Balgowan provided a sawmill for the timber industry. It made hardwood flooring and fence panels as well as wood chips and sawdust. The mill was on the Perth-Crieff rail line and had sidings that were used for bringing in imported tropical hardwood for flooring. The sawmill site is now used for housing.
