= Innerpeffray Library =

First lending library in Scotland

Coordinates: 56.3447°N 3.7782°W

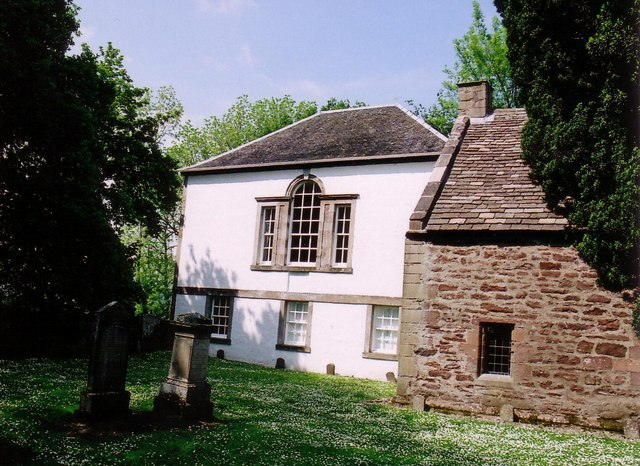
Innerpeffray Library

Innerpeffray Library was the first lending library in Scotland. It is located in the hamlet of Innerpeffray, by the River Earn in Perth and Kinross, 4 miles (6 kilometres) southeast of Crieff. The library building is Category A listed.

== St Mary's Chapel ==
Innerpeffray Library started in 1680 in the attic of St Mary's Chapel, Church of the Blessed Virgin, or Innerpeffray Chapel as it has later been known.

The chapel is mentioned from 1365 and is linked to Lord John Drummond. The chapel may have started as a chantry, however, by 1542 it was referred to as a collegiate church which served the parish of Monzie.

During the Scottish Reformation in the 16th century, the chapel was damaged considerably; the lands and endowments were passed to James Drummond, the first Lord Madertie. James married Jean, daughter of Sir James Chisolm of Cromlix; however, James died in 1620.

Innerpeffray Castle was built close to the chapel in 1610, the chapel's use after the Scottish Reformation meant that it was never again used as a Protestant place of worship but instead was used for as a mausoleum for the Drummond family, as well as a Catholic place of worship.

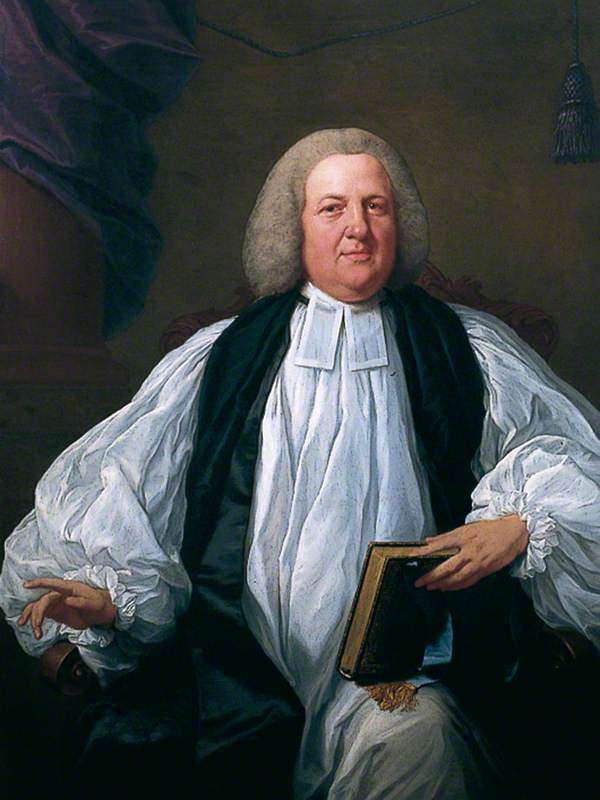
Rev. Robert Hay Drummond

== Early history of the building ==
David Drummond (died 1692), the third Lord Madertie requested in his will that a library be kept partly in the west end of the chapel and partly in a building he had recently constructed in the east end of the kirkyard. This was to house David's large collection of books in religion, witchcraft, demonology and astrology. David died in 1692, and the Governors of the Innerpeffray Mortification, a registered charity under Scottish law, started to administer and maintain the collection in 1694. The library was to be devoted for the use of the public and became the first public lending library in Scotland.

In 1739, Robert Hay Drummond inherited the Innefpeffray Estate, he commissioned the architect Charles Freebairn to erect the purpose-built library and reading room. The Georgian building was completed in 1762 and was larger than the original library, to house the Drummond family collection as well as Robert's own collection which he donated to the library.

== Innerpeffray Library ==
The library ceased lending in 1968; however, it remains open to the public several days a week, from March through to the end of October. Hours of operation are Wednesday to Saturday 10 am-5 pm and Sunday 2 pm-5 pm.

=== Collection ===
Among the collection that the library holds is the Bible of the Marquis of Montrose, bearing his autograph in several places. There is also a copy of what is called the Great Bible, dated 1540, which has two full-page woodcuts by Holbein, the artist of Henry VIII of England.

The library remains a valuable storehouse of literature from the Late Medieval and Early Modern periods and has been visited by many people throughout the years that it has been open.

One of the Library's most valued books is the original Borrowers' Register that holds the record of all the families who borrowed a book. This resource allows people to come and identify their ancestors from the region, see their own handwriting and hold the books they once borrowed.

=== Keeper of the Books ===
The Keeper of Books is an office held continuously since Andrew Patoune in 1696. The Keeper also holds the key of the Collegiate Chapel of St Mary, at Her Majesty's pleasure.

The current Keeper of Books, as of 2019, is listed as Lara Haggerty.

=== The library in the media ===
The BBC broadcast from the library on 31 January 1950.

== Roman history ==
Innerpeffray Library is located near the sites of the Roman fort of Strageath, Roman military camps and the Parkneuk Roman Tower. These were all part of a series of fortifications known as the Gask Ridge. The route of a former Roman Road runs right by the library building, and the Heritage Trail leads down to the River Earn, where a ford crossing allowed Roman access to Strageath Fort. An Innerpeffray publication includes detailed maps and sketches of what these Roman sites might have looked like.

== See also ==
- List of Category A listed buildings in Perth and Kinross
