= Innerpeffray =

Hamlet in Perth and Kinross, Scotland

Coordinates: 56.3447°N 3.7782°W

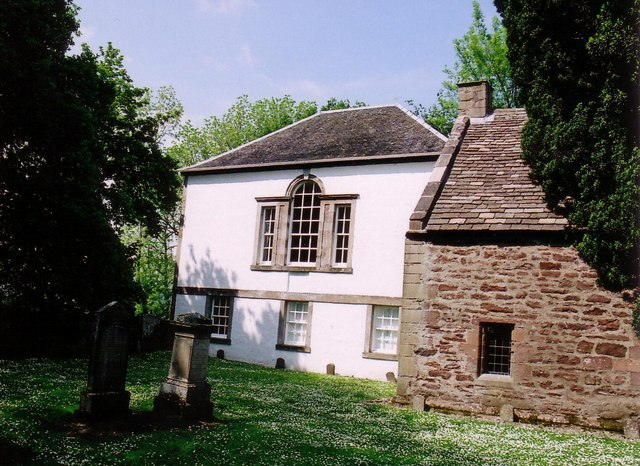
Innerpeffray Library, the first lending library in Scotland

Innerpeffray is a hamlet in Perthshire, Scotland, 4 miles (6.4 km) southeast of Crieff. It is located on a raised promontory among beech woodland above the River Earn. A fording point across the river can still be used, on what is the line of a Roman Road.

The settlement mainly consists of an early complete and very important group of educational and religious buildings, all founded, built or rebuilt by the Drummond family of Strathearn.

== Collegiate Chapel of St Mary ==
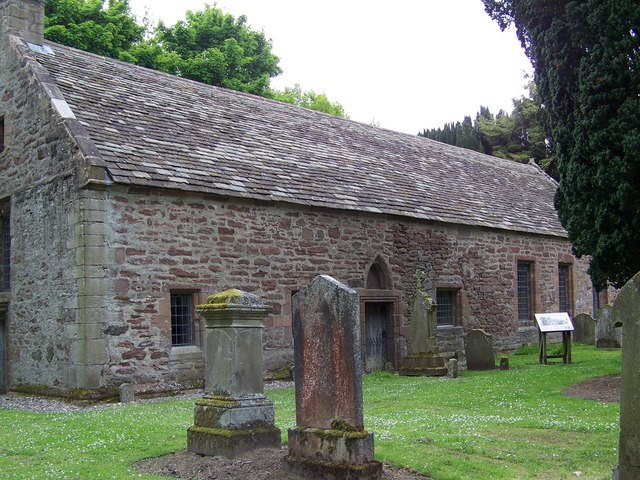
Innerpeffray Collegiate Church

Innerpeffray Collegiate Church is an early-16th-century church. It is a scheduled monument.

The chapel was built in 1507 by John Drummond, 1st Lord Drummond, who is also buried there.

== History ==
Human settlements in the area date back to nearly 4000 years ago, but the oldest confirmed settlement at the site is the Strageath Roman Fort, across the River Earn.

== Innerpeffray Library ==
Innerpeffray Library is a historic subscription library and was the first lending library in Scotland. The current library building was completed in 1762 and is Category A listed.

== Innerpeffray Castle ==
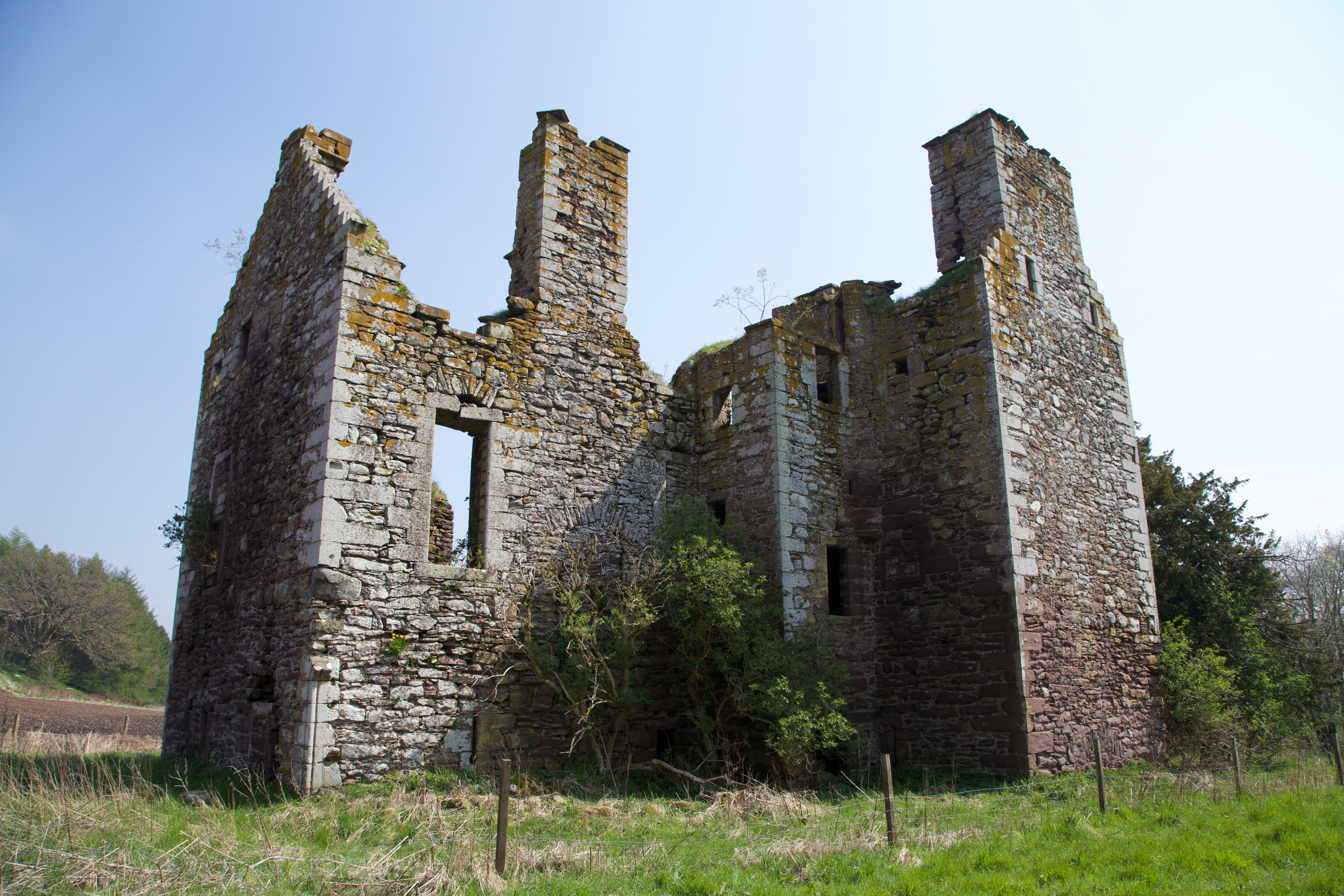
Innerpeffray Castle

The land was controlled by Inchaffray Abbey until the Reformation when it was confiscated by the crown and sold to the Drummond family. Mary, Queen of Scots, stayed at Innerpeffray in June 1565.

The current ruinous 17th century L-plan tower house, south of the village, was built by James Drummond, 1st Baron Maderty, on the corner of a former Roman marching camp. The form and design is typical of the period in Scotland with crowstepped gables. The structure contains gunloops and windows. A vaulted basement lies under the structure.

Drummond Castle, to the southwest of Crieff is the current Drummond family seat. The castle and the site of the Roman camp are both protected as scheduled monuments.

== Innerpeffray railway station ==
Innerpeffray railway station to the north, now disused, served the hamlets of Innerpeffray and Millhills.

== Notable people ==
- James Drummond, 1st Baron Maderty
- Maol Choluim de Innerpeffray

== See also ==
- List of Category A listed buildings in Perth and Kinross
- List of places in Perth and Kinross
