= Crieff and Methven Junction Railway =

Former railway line in Scotland

Overview
- Locale: Scotland
- Dates of operation: 14 July 1864–26 July 1869
- Successor: Caledonian Railway

Technical
- Track gauge: 4 ft 8 1/2 in (1,435 mm)

The Crieff and Methven Junction Railway was a Scottish railway, opened in 1866, connecting Crieff with a branch line that ran from Methven to Perth.

As a purely local concern, the line was dependent on local traffic, and when that declined in the middle of the twentieth century, the railway became unsustainable. It closed to passengers in 1951 and completely in 1967.

== History ==
Crieff and Methven Junction Railway Act 1864
- Act of Parliament
- Parliament of the United Kingdom
- Long title: An Act for making a Railway from the Town of Crieff to the Perth, Almond Valley, and Methuen Railway near Methven; and for other Purposes.
- Citation: 27 & 28 Vict. c. clxxxix

Dates
- Royal assent: 14 July 1864

Text of statute as originally enacted

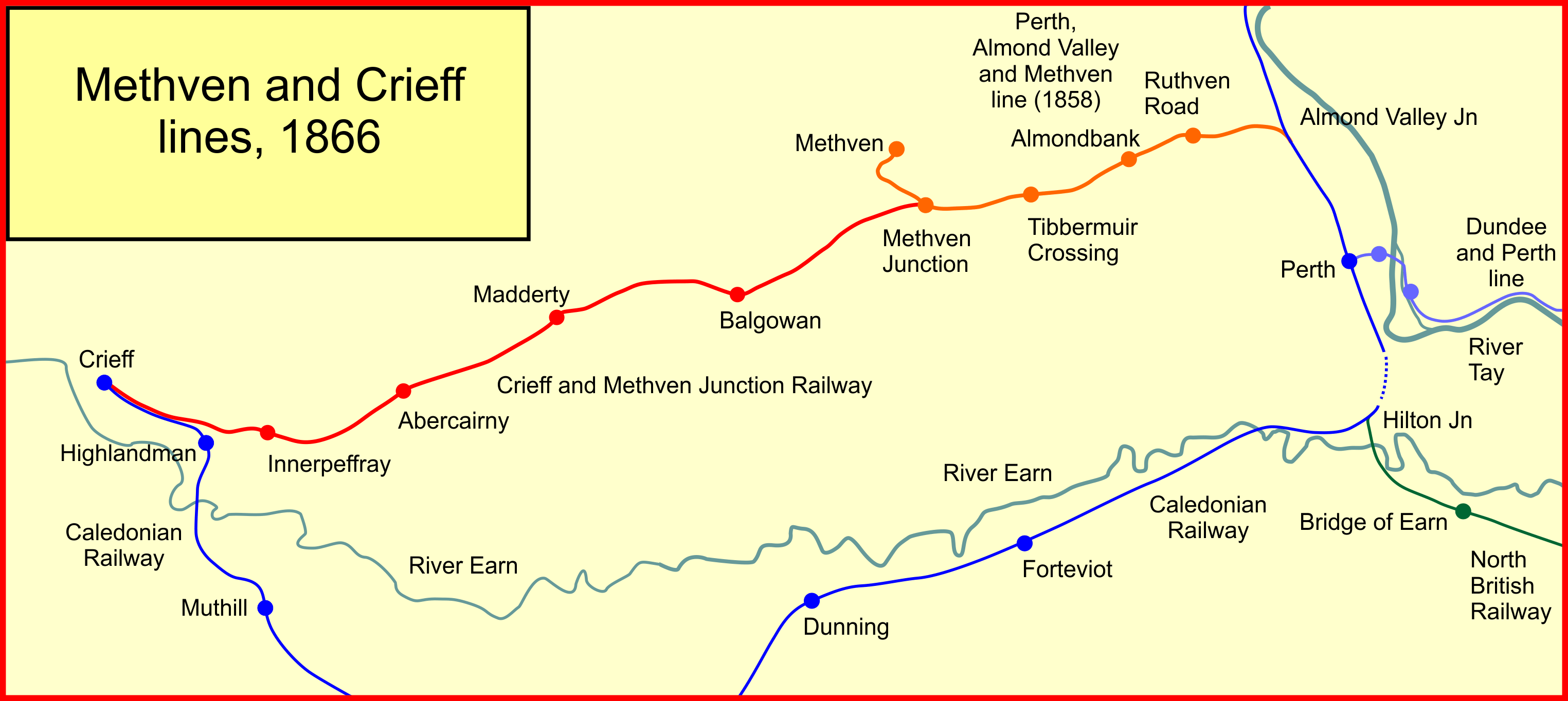
System map of the Methven lines

The company receive authorisation to build the line in the Crieff and Methven Junction Railway Act 1864 (27 & 28 Vict. c. clxxxix) on 14 July 1864, with the line being completed in 1867. Perth was linked to the growing Scottish railway network when the Scottish Central Railway opened its main line from Castlecary, near Falkirk, in 1848. The Scottish Central was allied with the Caledonian Railway, connecting with Glasgow and Carlisle, and the Scottish Midland Junction Railway built northwards from Perth, also opening in 1848, giving connection to Forfar and over other lines to Aberdeen.

Places served by these main lines experienced an economic benefit: the prices of commodities such as lime and coal brought in fell considerably, and the cost of delivering their manufactured goods and agricultural products to market also reduced. By contrast, towns not yet connected experienced a worsening in their position, and business interests in Methven proposed a railway to their town, and the Perth, Almond Valley and Methven Railway opened from a junction north of Perth to Methven on 1 January 1858.

The important town of Crieff also suffered from the lack of a railway connection, and in 1856 the Crieff Junction Railway opened, from a location then called Crieff Junction, on the main line between Stirling and Perth: it is now known as Gleneagles station. This more southerly connection was convenient for transits towards Glasgow and Edinburgh, but Perth was a major commercial and agricultural centre at this period, and passengers from Crieff to Perth preferred to travel by road coach to Methven, continuing their journey over the Almond Valley line.

A railway link was suggested and on 14 July 1864 the Crieff and Methven Junction Railway was authorised by the Crieff and Methven Junction Railway Act 1864 (27 & 28 Vict. c. clxxxix). The company's capital was £66,000. The line opened on 21 May 1866, from a junction with the Methven line a mile south of the Methven terminus. The line ran broadly west, following the Pow Water, entering the eastern margin of Crieff alongside the Crieff Junction line, and using that company's station facilities.

The Crieff Junction line was absorbed by the Scottish Central Railway in 1865, and the Crieff and Methven Junction Railway was worked by the Scottish Central Railway until absorption by the Caledonian Railway in 1868.

In the latter half of the century tourism developed considerably and Strathearn became a destination of great importance. Road tours were arranged from Crieff, and in 1893 the Crieff and Comrie Railway built westward from Crieff; this involved a new and more commodious station at Crieff. The Comrie line was extended still further, eventually reaching Lochearnhead and Balquhidder on the route of the Callander and Oban Railway.

The importance of the town of Methven was considerably reduced in the later years of the nineteenth century, and the decline continued in the twentieth; the section from Methven Junction to Methven terminus closed to passengers on 27 September 1937. The remaining line was continuous from Crieff to Perth (Almond Valley Junction) and was operated by the Caledonian Railway as a single route. However carryings on the line declined as well, and on 1 October 1951 passenger traffic on the line ceased. Goods traffic continued until that too was discontinued on 11 September 1967.

== Topography ==
Passenger stations on the line were:

- Methven Junction (station); it was an unadvertised exchange station from 1889 until closure of the Methven section in 1937;
- Balgowan;
- Madderty;
- Abercairny; certain early publications spelt the station Abbercairny and also Abercairney;
- Innerpeffray; closed 1 January 1917; re-opened 2 June 1919;
- Crieff; Crieff Junction Railway station; relocated on the opening of the Comrie line on 1 June 1893.

== Connections to other lines ==
- Perth, Almond Valley and Methven Railway at Methven Junction
- Crieff Junction Railway at Crieff
- Crieff and Comrie Railway at Crieff
