= Perth, Almond Valley and Methven Railway =

Railway line in Scotland

The Perth, Almond Valley and Methven Railway was a Scottish railway line that connected Methven with Perth. It opened in 1858.

A line onwards to Crieff was built from a junction on the line south of Methven; that line opened in 1866.

The Methven end of the line closed to passengers in 1937, but the trains to Crieff continued over the first part of the line and then the Crieff extension. The entire line closed to passengers in 1951, and completely in 1967.

== History ==
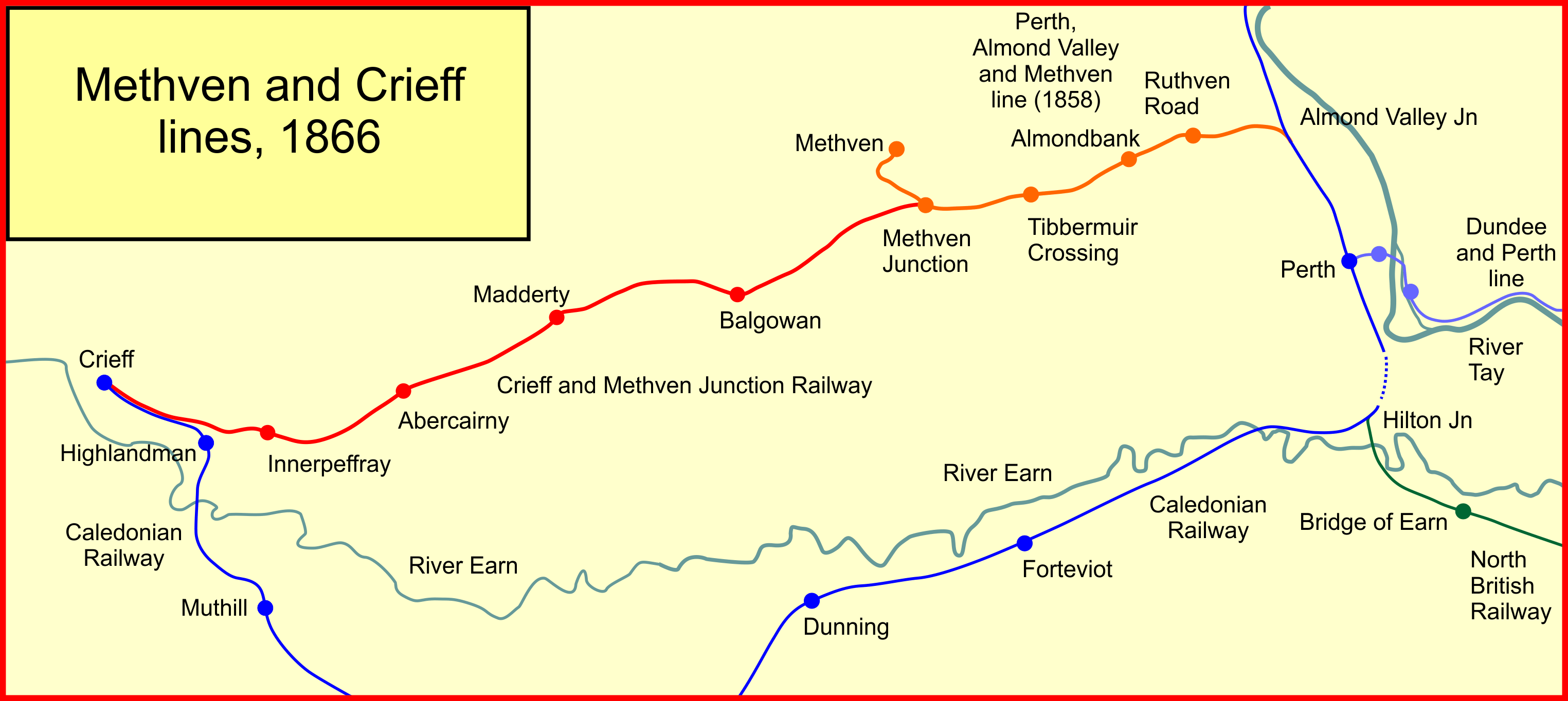
System map of the Methven lines

As the Scottish railway network developed, the Scottish Central Railway (SCR) was authorised by the Scottish Central Railway Act 1845 (8 & 9 Vict. c. clxi) and opened its line from Castlecary, near Falkirk, to Perth in 1848. It was linked with the Caledonian Railway, giving a continuous line of railway from Carlisle, Glasgow, and London.

The Scottish Midland Junction Railway (SMJR) was authorised by the Scottish Midland Junction Railway Act 1845 (8 & 9 Vict. c. clxx) at the same time as the SCR and opened its main line in 1848, between Perth and Forfar, connecting there with other lines to connect to Aberdeen.

Towns that were not on the line of railway saw that they were at a disadvantage as the price of minerals brought in was high, and local manufacturers could not compete against connected towns' produce, because of the cost of transport to market. Local interests in Methven promoted a railway connection to the SMJR; the route would be easy, following the valley of the River Almond and a parliamentary bill was submitted. The Perth, Almond Valley and Methven Railway Act 1856 (19 & 20 Vict. c. cxxxvi) obtained royal assent on 29 July 1856, authorising the Perth, Almond Valley and Methven Railway; authorised capital was £25,000 with borrowing powers of £8,000.

The SMJR had amalgamated with the Aberdeen Railway, forming the Scottish North Eastern Railway (SNER) in 1856, and the SNER inherited the obligation undertaken by the SMJR to contribute £7,000 to the shareholding.

The line opened on 1 January 1858.

Scottish North Eastern and Perth Almond Valley and Methven Railways Act 1864
- Act of Parliament
- Parliament of the United Kingdom
- Long title: An Act to enable the Perth, Almond Valley, and Methven Railway Company to raise additional Capital, and to sell their Undertaking to the Scottish North-eastern Railway Company, and to enable that Company to purchase the same; and for other Purposes.
- Citation: 27 & 28 Vict. c. lxxxiii

Dates
- Royal assent: 23 June 1864

Text of statute as originally enacted

From 1861 to 1864 the locomotive in operation was a 0-4-0T from the R & W Hawthorn & Co foundry. It was later acquired by SNER under locomotive number 35.

The railway was worked by the SNER, and it was taken over by the larger company on 1 January 1864. However, parliamentary authorisation of the acquisition was obtained in the Scottish North Eastern and Perth Almond Valley and Methven Railways Act 1864 (27 & 28 Vict. c. lxxxiii) the following June.

For a time Crieff was reached from Perth over the railway to Methven and then by a connecting road coach; this continued until the Crieff and Methven Junction Railway, authorised by the Crieff and Methven Junction Railway Act 1864 (27 & 28 Vict. c. clxxxix), was opened in 1866, running from a junction near Methven, effectively extending the Almond Valley line.

In LMS days the branch passenger service was light, and it was operated by a steam railcar produced by the Sentinel Waggon Works. The cars had a chain drive and did not have buffers. Thomas and Turnock quote a traveler's narrative of an evening journey; there was an air of self-consciousness in the unaccustomed intimacy of the saloon accommodation;

We seemed very near the ground and the small wheels made an unusual tapping noise as they almost sank into the rail joints. The Sentinel did well enough but we did wonder what would happen if the chain drive failed as, quivering with energy, she made the final steep hill into Methven.

The town of Methven declined considerably towards the end of the nineteenth century, and the Methven section beyond the junction for the Crieff line was eventually closed to passengers on 27 September 1937. The remaining section from Almond Valley Junction ran as a continuous route to Crieff until that too closed on 1 October 1951. Goods traffic continued to serve Methven until 25 January 1965, and the entire route closed on 11 September 1967.

== Topography ==
The line ran from a junction north of Perth, aligned for through running from Perth. At Methven Junction, the Crieff line continued onwards, from the opening of that line in 1866.

- Almond Valley Junction;
- Ruthven Road Crossing; opened May 1859; request stop at first; renamed Ruthven 1938;
- Tibbermuir Crossing; opened February 1859; request stop at first; also referred to as Tibbermuir & Powfoot, and Tibbermuir Halt; renamed Tibbermuir from 1938;
- Methven Junction (station); opened 21 May 1866 on the opening of the line to Crieff; it was an unadvertised exchange station from 1889 until the closure of the Methven section in 1937;
- Methven; closed to passengers 27 September 1937.

== Connections to other lines ==
- Crieff and Methven Junction Railway at Methven Junction
- Scottish Midland Junction Railway at Almond Valley Junction (Perth)

== Sources ==
- Awdry, Christopher (1990). Encyclopaedia of British Railway Companies. Sparkford: Patrick Stephens Ltd. ISBN 1-8526-0049-7. OCLC 19514063. CN 8983.
- Jowett, Alan (March 1989). Jowett's Railway Atlas of Great Britain and Ireland: From Pre-Grouping to the Present Day (1st ed.). Sparkford: Patrick Stephens Ltd. ISBN 978-1-85260-086-0. OCLC 22311137.
