= Nairn railway station =

Railway station in the Highlands of Scotland

Nairn Scottish Gaelic: Inbhir Narann
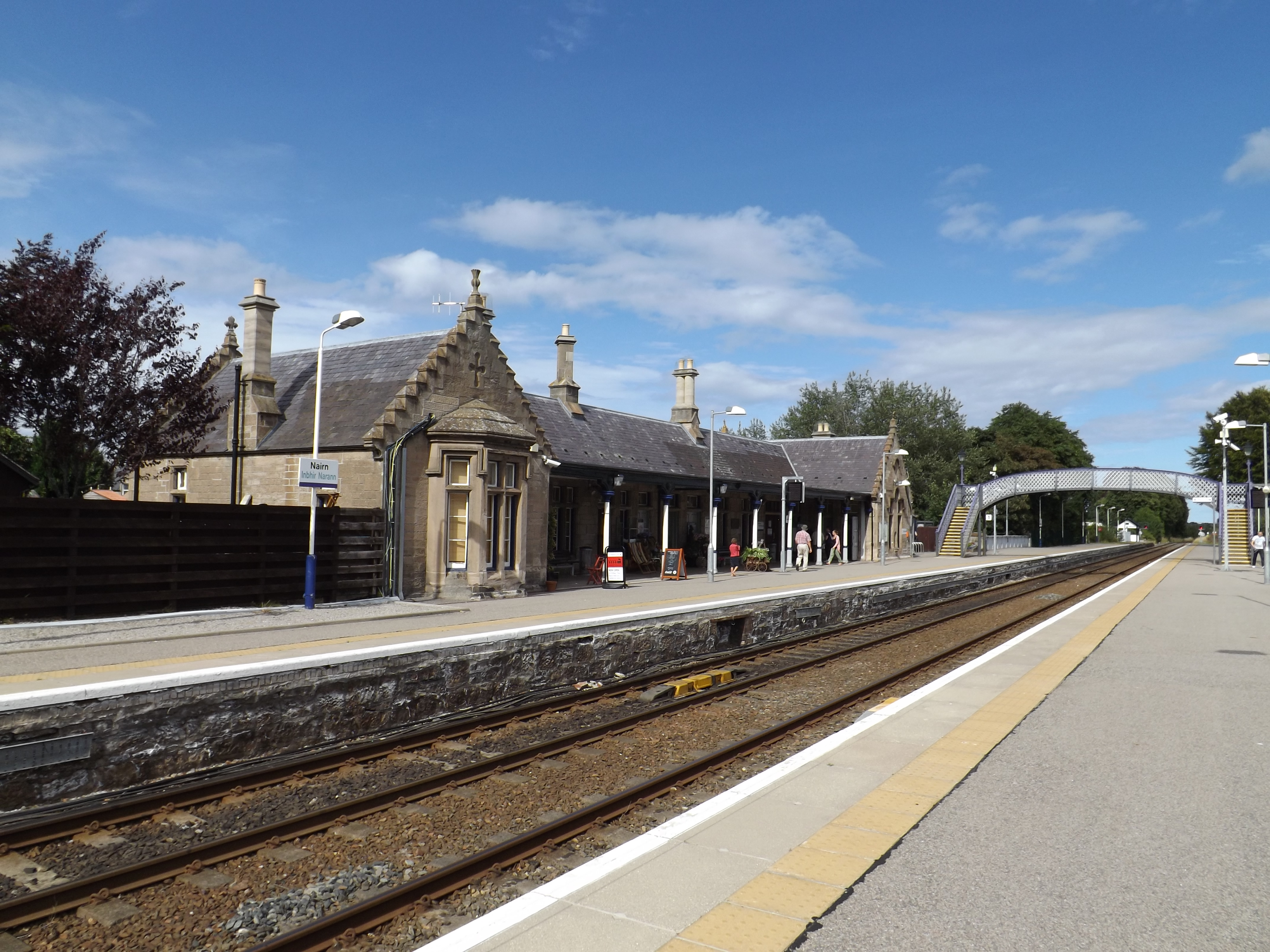
- The station in 2013

General information
- Location: Nairn, Highland; Scotland
- Coordinates: 57.5803°N 3.8716°W
- Grid reference: NH881560
- Manager: ScotRail
- Platforms: 2

Other information
- Station code: NRN

History
- Original company: Inverness and Nairn Railway and Inverness and Aberdeen Junction Railway
- Pre-grouping: Highland Railway
- Post-grouping: London, Midland and Scottish Railway

Key dates
- 7 November 1855: Opened

Passengers
- 2020/21: ▼46,324
- 2021/22: ▲0.101 million
- 2022/23: ▲0.102 million
- 2023/24: ▲0.134 million
- 2024/25: ▲0.138 million

Listed Building – Category B
- Designated: 12 March 1981
- Reference no.: LB38454
Location
Notes
- Passenger statistics from the Office of Rail and Road

Nairn railway station is a railway station serving the town of Nairn in Scotland. The station is managed and served by ScotRail and is on the Aberdeen to Inverness Line, between Forres and Inverness Airport, measured 128 miles 72 chains (207.4 km) from Perth via the former Dava route. It is a category B listed building.

== History ==
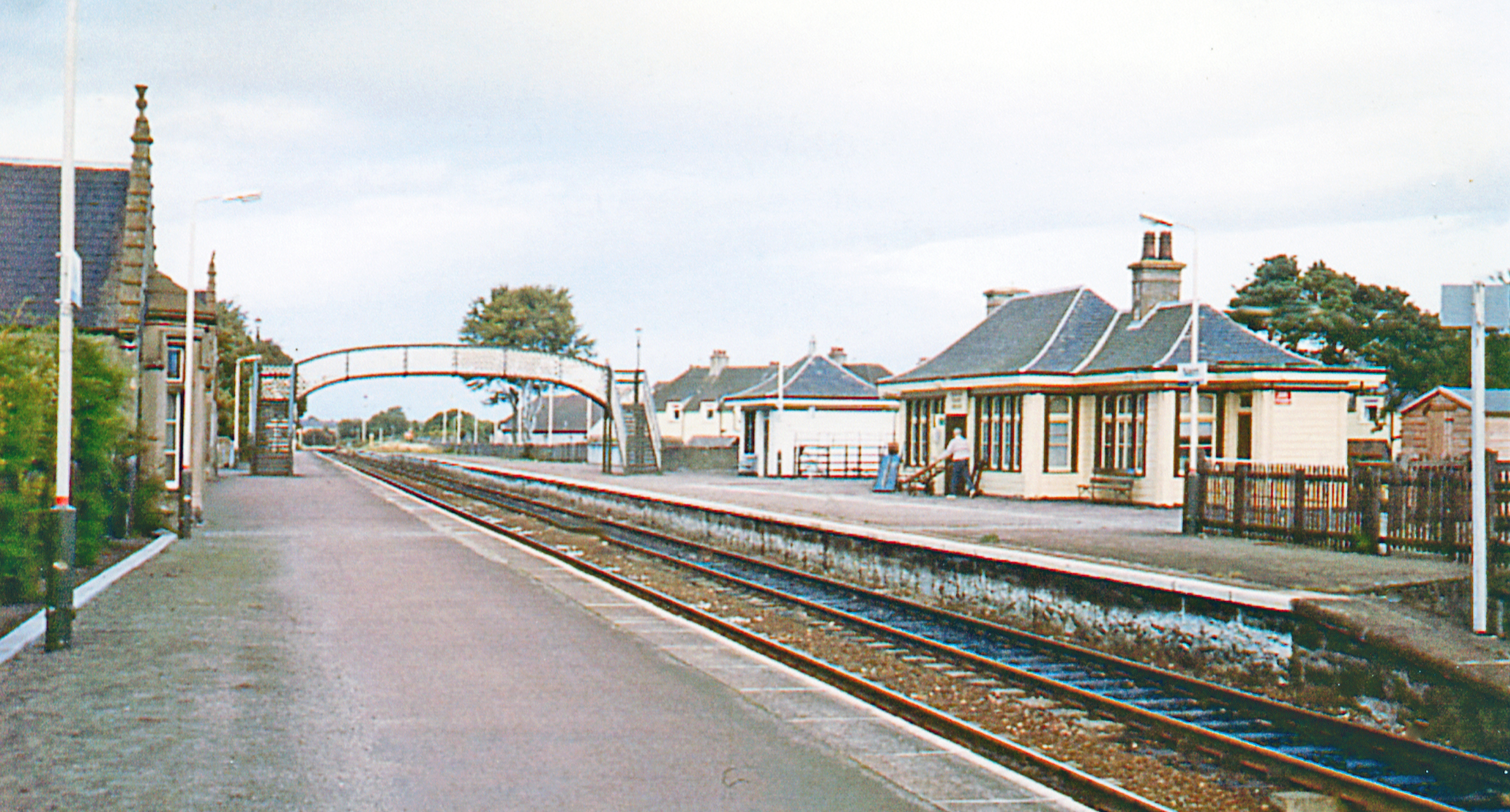
The station seen in 1989

The station was first opened on 7 November 1855 by the Inverness and Nairn Railway. In 1857, the line was extended eastwards to Dalvey. The route from Aberdeen to Inverness was merged into one company, the Inverness and Aberdeen Junction Railway, in 1861.

In 1885 the Highland Railway Company agreed to improve the facilities at Nairn, including:

- Replacing the station buildings with improved accommodation for passenger and staff;
- Masonry work, completed by Mr. Squair of Nairn;
- Erecting a new station master's house;
- Extending the platforms to around 440 yards (400 m) and raising them in height to the level of the carriages;
- Installing a new iron foot bridge over the line to connect the platforms, meaning passengers avoid using a foot crossing over the running lines

The bridge over Cawdor Road was also widened at the same time. The work was completed in 1886.

The station was notable for being the last working example of Highland Railway signalling principles, where a signal box was provided at each end to work the signals & points whilst the key token instruments for working the single line were located in the main building. The distance between the boxes was such that a bicycle was officially provided by BR (and later Railtrack) for the signaller to use.

Control of the signalling at the station has since transferred to a new workstation in the Inverness signalling centre, following a 10-day line closure that also saw the loop at Elgin lengthened and a new station and loop commissioned at Forres. The signalbox itself closed in October 2017.

== Facilities ==
The station has a ticket office, ticket machine and accessible toilet on platform 1, adjacent to some bike racks and one of the car parks. The other is adjacent to platform 2, which is equipped with a flower shop and a help point. There is step-free access to both platforms, but not between them, as the bridge linking them does not have lifts.

== Platform layout ==
The station is 128 miles 72 chains (207.4 km) from Perth (measured via Dava), and has a passing loop 29 chains (580 m) long, flanked by two platforms which can each accommodate an eight-coach train.

== Passenger volume ==
Passenger Volume at Nairn
	2004–05	2005–06	2006–07	2007–08	2008–09	2009–10	2010–11	2011–12	2012–13	2013–14	2014–15	2015–16	2016–17	2017–18	2018–19	2019–20	2020–21	2021–22	2022–23	2023–24	2024–25
Entries and exits	80,626	85,488	75,353	70,454	75,490	83,980	101,182	111,748	112,014	116,768	127,180	130,174	120,504	112,142	117,780	134,518	46,324	100,752	101,642	133,760	137,890

The statistics cover twelve month periods that start in April.

== Services ==
As of May 2026, there are seventeen daily departures from the station each way on weekdays and Saturdays. Most are through trains between Aberdeen and Inverness, but some trains start from or terminate at Elgin. One departure runs through to Edinburgh in the morning. On Sundays there are five through trains each way.

Preceding station	National Rail	Following station
Forres	ScotRail; Aberdeen–Inverness line	Inverness Airport
	Historical railways	
Auldearn; Line open, station closed	Highland Railway; Inverness and Aberdeen Junction Railway; Inverness and Nairn Railway	Gollanfield Junction; Line open, station closed

== Bibliography ==
- Quick, Michael (2023). Railway Passenger Stations in Great Britain: A Chronology (PDF) (5th ed.). London: Railway and Canal Historical Society.
- Thomas, John and Turnock, David (1989) A Regional History of the Railways of Great Britain: volume 15: North of Scotland, David St John Thomas (publisher), Newton Abbot, ISBN 0946537 03 8, page 154
