= Inverness Airport railway station =

Railway station in the Highlands of Scotland

Inverness Airport Scottish Gaelic: Port-adhair Inbhir Nis
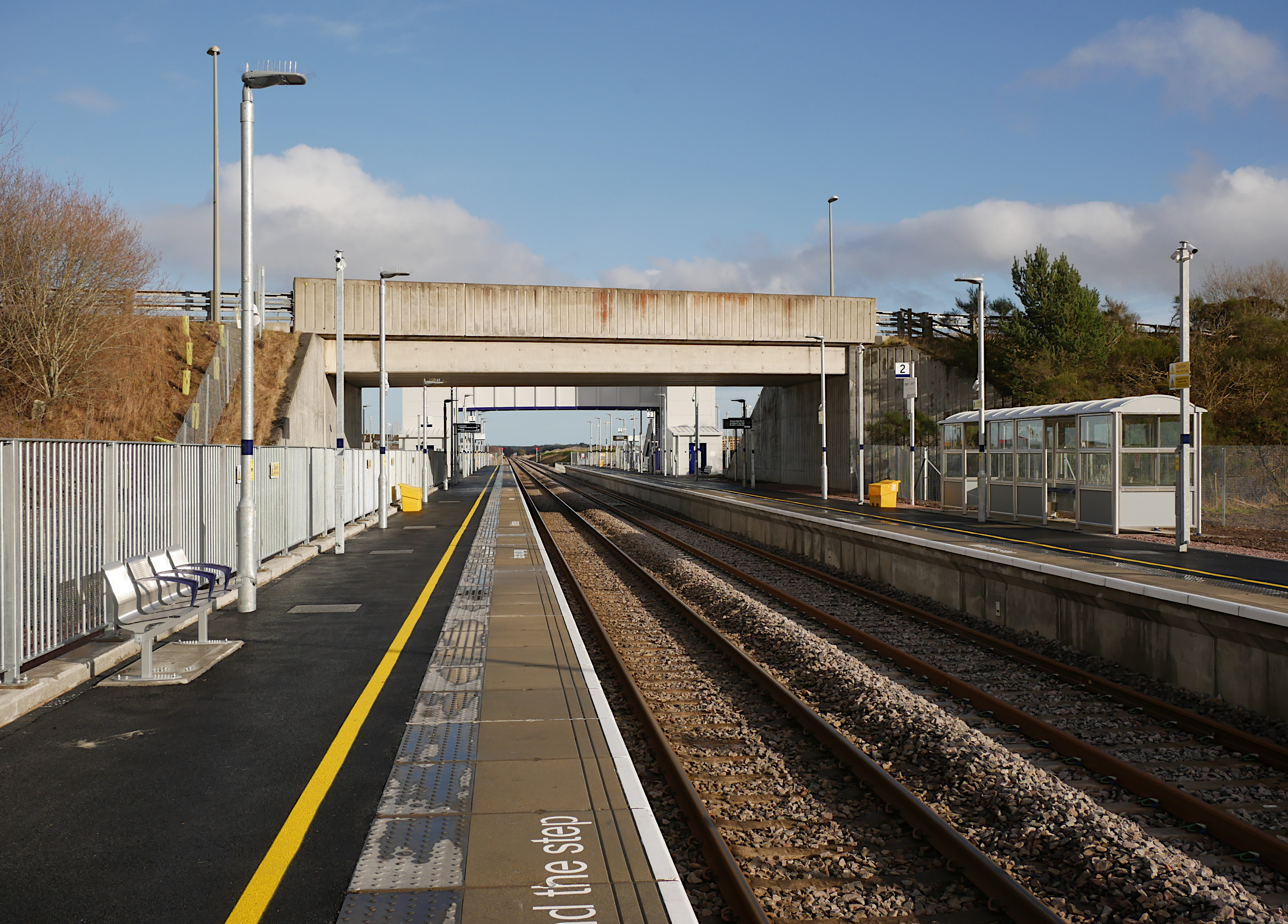
- Inverness Airport railway station, February 2023

General information
- Location: Dalcross, Highland; Scotland
- Coordinates: 57.5335°N 4.0552°W
- Grid reference: NH770511
- Operator: ScotRail
- Platforms: 2

Other information
- Station code: IVA

Key dates
- 2 February 2023: Station opened

Passengers
- 2022/23: 6,096
- 2023/24: ▲53,920
- 2024/25: ▲61,166
Location

Inverness Airport railway station serves Inverness Airport in the Scottish Highlands. The station is located on the Aberdeen–Inverness line between Nairn and Inverness, close to the site of the former Dalcross railway station. It was opened on 2 February 2023, and is served by ScotRail services between Inverness and Aberdeen. It is 136 miles 43 chains (219.7 km) from Perth, measured via Dava and Aviemore.

== History ==
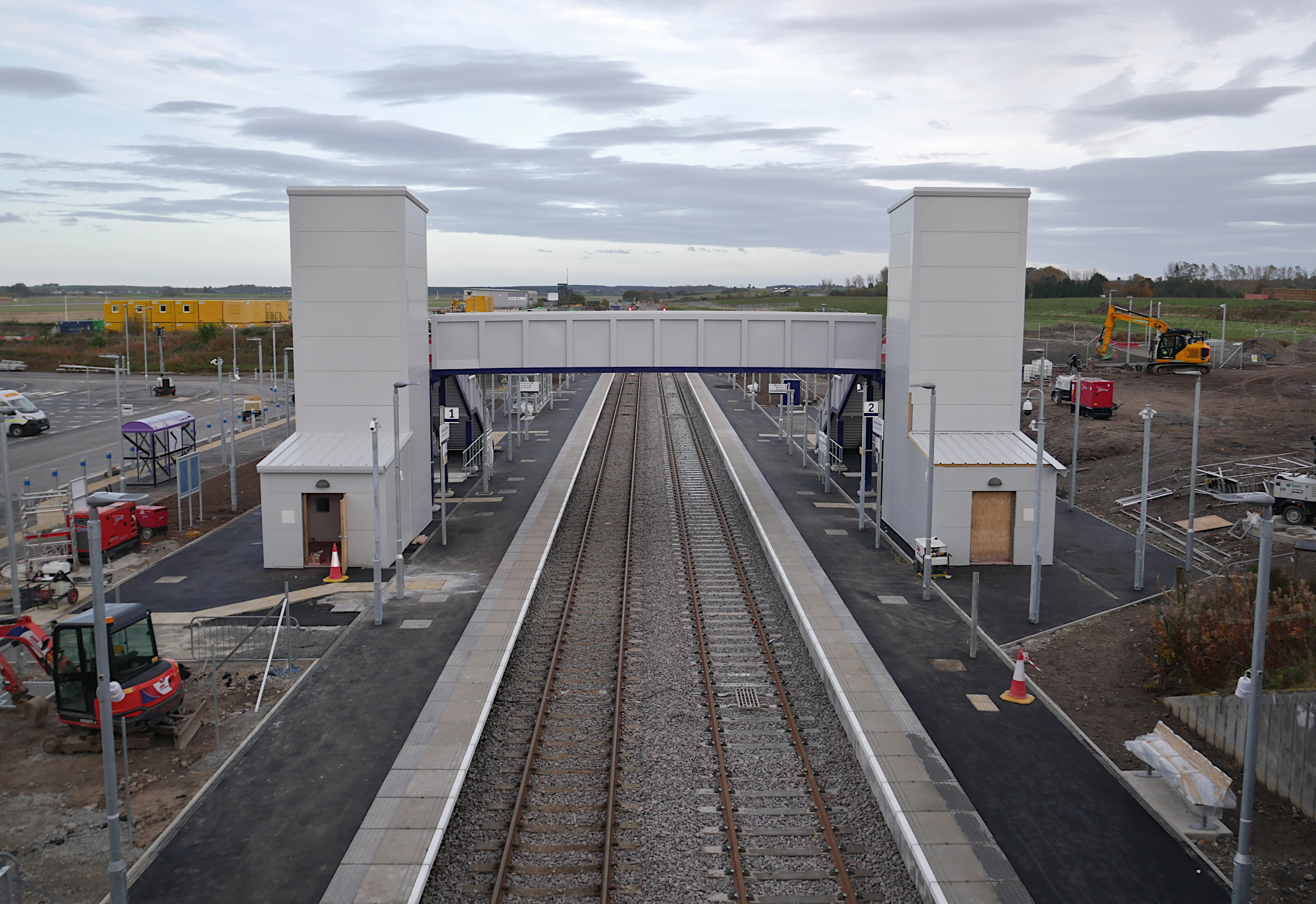
Station under construction, October 2022

In June 2006 a proposal was announced by Highland Council to open a new station at Dalcross, which would serve Inverness Airport and also provide park-and-ride facilities for commuters to Inverness, relieving road congestion to the east of Inverness, and so helping to reduce carbon dioxide emissions. It was specified that the station could have one platform on the north side of the line, 173 metres (568 ft) long. There was also the possibility of providing a passing loop, which could not extend further west than the level crossing; a second platform would be built on the south side of the loop. In February 2011, Keith Brown, the Minister for Transport and Infrastructure in the Scottish Government, stated that discussions on the proposed station (and another at Kintore) were being held between Transport Scotland and Network Rail. A £170 million infrastructure upgrade project for the line, funded by Transport Scotland, was announced in 2014. Provision for station reopenings here and at Kintore were included in the plans, along with signalling & track improvements, relocation of the station at Forres and platform extension works at Elgin and Insch.

The station was intended to open by 2019, if construction was to begin in 2017. The station was later expected to open in the first half of Network Rail's Control Period 6, which lasted from 2019 to 2024. Network Rail submitted an updated planning application in December 2020 for a two-platform station with step-free access to both platforms. The airport was also exploring the possibility of relocating its terminal to be beside the planned railway station, opening a public consultation in 2021.

The final plan for the station included two platforms, a 64 space car park with 10 electric bays, cycle storage, and two lifts providing step-free access. A passing loop was also included. In October 2021, ground works associated with the station as well as embankments commenced. The main platforms, lift shafts and associated works for the footbridge began in early 2022. The level crossing at Petty was also closed in October 2022.

The station was originally due to open in December 2022, although its opening was pushed back into early 2023. The station was officially opened on 2 February 2023 by Jenny Gilruth, the Minister for Transport and pupils from Croy Primary School with the first journeys by the general public expected the following day.

== Facilities ==
The station has step-free access throughout, with a footbridge and lifts connecting both platforms. There is a car park and cycle spaces, waiting shelters, help points and a ticket machine.

== Passenger volume ==
Passenger Volume at Inverness Airport
	2022–23	2023–24	2024–25
Entries and exits	6,096	53,920	61,166

The statistics cover twelve month periods that start in April.

== Services ==
All services at Inverness Airport are operated by ScotRail. The station is served by an approximately hourly service in each direction between Inverness and Elgin, with alternate trains continuing to Aberdeen approximately every two hours. A very small number of trains continue beyond Aberdeen to and from Dundee and Edinburgh Waverley.

Preceding station	National Rail	Following station
Nairn	ScotRail Aberdeen to Inverness Line	Inverness

== Connections ==
A half-hourly bus service connects the station to the airport.

== Bibliography ==
- "Talks on new rail stations at Kintore and Dalcross". BBC News Highlands & Islands. 10 February 2011.
- Pringle, Gordon (22 October 2010). "Aberdeen to Inverness Rail Improvement" (PDF). Network Rail. Archived from the original (PDF) on 20 August 2011.
- "Strategic Transport Projects Review - Report 3 Generation, Sifting and Appraisal of Interventions - Annex 2" (PDF). Transport Scotland. 18 November 2008. Archived from the original (PDF) on 10 March 2012.
