= Allanfearn railway station =

Railway station in the Scottish Highlands

Coordinates: 57.50031°N 4.14669°W

Allanfearn
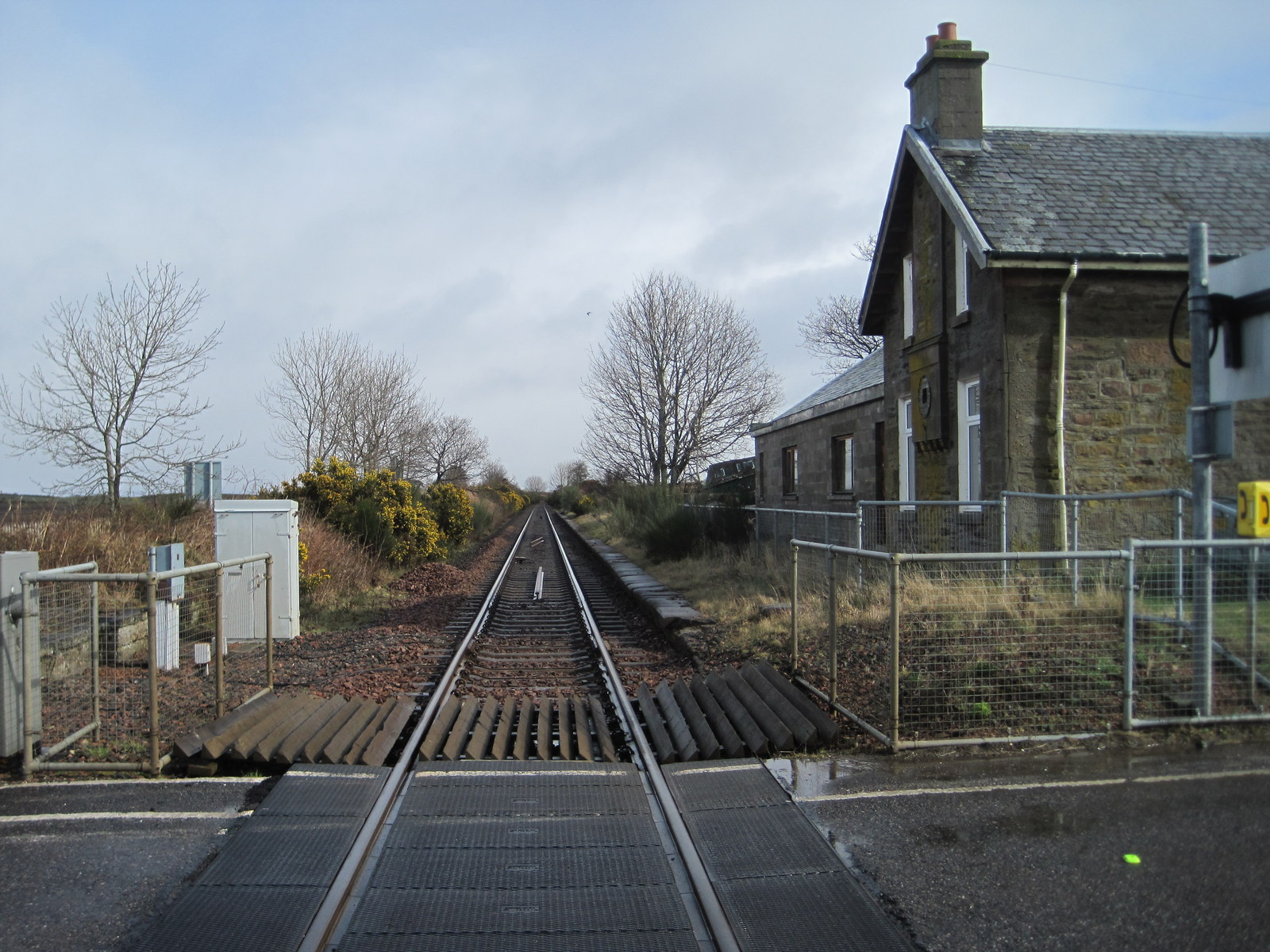
- Site of Allanfearn station, 2015

General information
- Location: Near Culloden, Highland; Scotland
- Platforms: 2

Other information
- Status: Disused

History
- Original company: Inverness and Nairn Railway
- Pre-grouping: Highland Railway
- Post-grouping: LMSR

Key dates
- 7 November 1855: Station opened as Culloden
- 1 November 1898: Station renamed Allanfearn
- 3 May 1965: Station Closed
Location

Allanfearn was a railway station located near Culloden, outside Inverness, Highland, Scotland. It was initially named Culloden when opened, but was renamed to Allanfearn in November 1898, to avoid confusion with the station at Culloden Moor on the newly opened direct line from Inverness to Aviemore.

== History ==
The station was opened on 7 November 1855 by the Inverness and Nairn Railway, it was renamed on 1 November 1898 when the Inverness and Aviemore Direct Railway opened. The line was absorbed by the Inverness and Aberdeen Junction Railway which in turn was absorbed by the Highland Railway, it became part of the London, Midland and Scottish Railway during the Grouping of 1923. The line then passed on to the Scottish Region of British Railways on nationalisation in 1948.

The station was host to a LMS caravan from 1936 to 1939. A camping coach was also positioned here by the Scottish Region from 1957 to 1963.

The station was closed by the British Railways Board in May 1965, along with the other surviving intermediate stations between Inverness & Nairn as a result of the Beeching Axe.

== Services ==
Preceding station	Historical railways	Following station
Castle Stuart Platform; Station closed; Line open	Highland Railway; Inverness and Nairn Railway	Inverness; Station and Line open

== The site today ==
The closed station buildings survive (next to an automatic half-barrier level crossing) and are now occupied. They are passed by trains on the single track Aberdeen to Inverness Line. Remains of a platform can also be seen.
