= Inverness Airport =

Airport in Inverness, Scotland

Inverness Airport Port-adhair Inbhir Nis

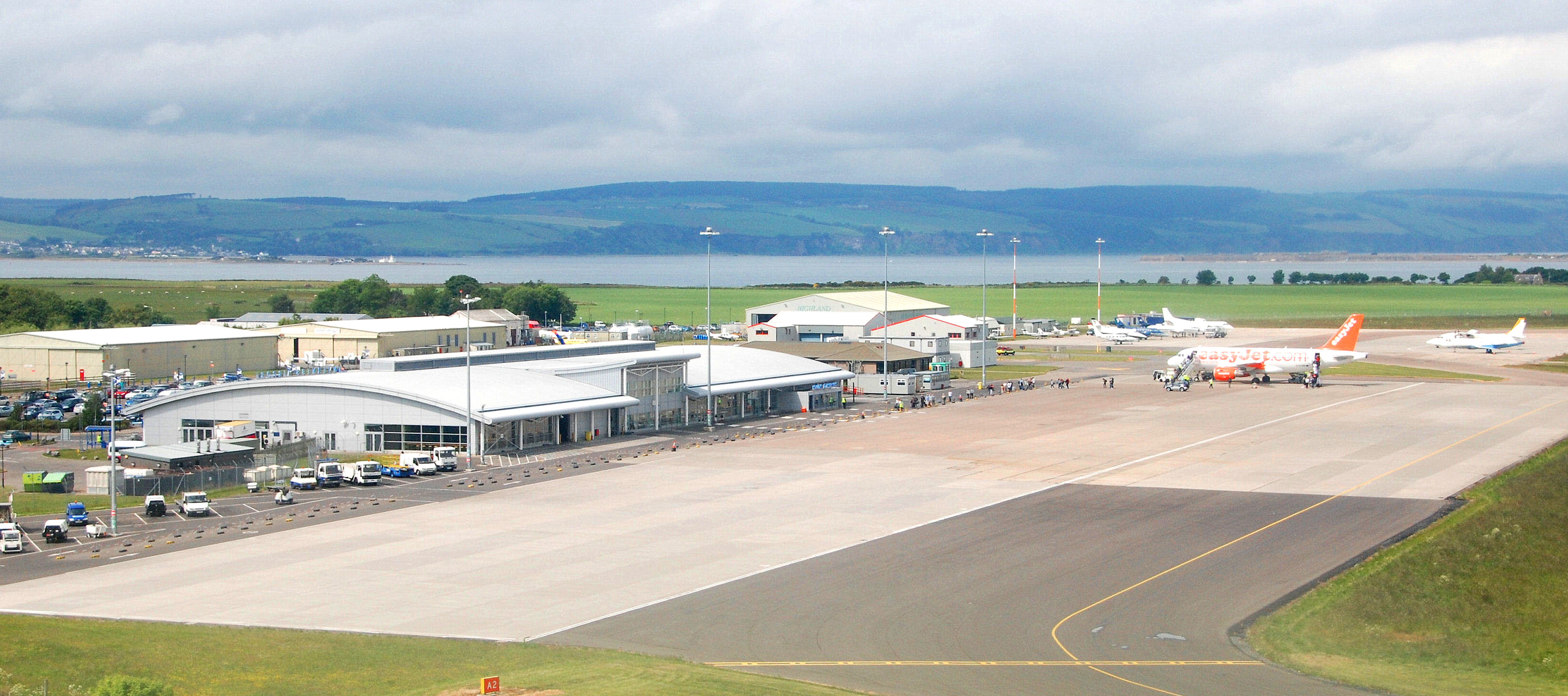
- IATA: INV; ICAO: EGPE

Summary
- Airport type: Public
- Owner/Operator: HIAL
- Serves: Inverness; Highland; Moray
- Location: Dalcross, Scotland
- Opened: 1940
- Focus city for: Loganair
- Elevation AMSL: 31 ft (9.4 m)
- Coordinates: 57°32′33″N 004°02′51″W
- Website: www.hial.co.uk/inverness-airport

Map
- Location in Highland Council Area

Runways
Direction	Length		Surface
Direction	m	ft	Surface
05/23	1,888	6,194	Asphalt
11/29	701	2,300	Asphalt

Statistics (2025)
- Passengers: 821,139
- Passenger change 2024–25: ▲3%
- Aircraft movements: 19,173
- Movements change 2024–25: ▼7%
- Sources: UK AIP at NATS; Statistics: UK Civil Aviation Authority

Inverness Airport (Scottish Gaelic: Port-adhair Inbhir Nis) (IATA: INV, ICAO: EGPE) is an international airport situated at Dalcross, 8 miles (13 km) north-east of Inverness, Scotland. It is owned by Highlands and Islands Airports Limited (HIAL). The airport is the main gateway for travellers to Inverness and the North of Scotland with a range of scheduled services throughout the United Kingdom, and few scheduled services to Europe (Amsterdam, and Mallorca in the summer). Charter and freight flights operate throughout the UK and Europe. Recent figures show 824,046 passengers passed through the airport in 2025. According to the Civil Aviation Authority (United Kingdom) Inverness airport was ranked 22nd busiest UK airport in the first quarter of 2026. The airport is also headquarters to Dalcross Handling which now operates across Scotland.

== History ==
=== Early years ===
The airfield was built by the Air Ministry in 1940 as Royal Air Force station Dalcross (RAF Dalcross), and was in use during the Second World War.

The following units were here at some point:

- No. 1 Flying Instructors School RAF detachment between January and February 1942
- No. 2 Air Gunners School RAF (July 1941 - November 1945)
- No. 2 Central Flying School RAF (1941)
- No. 2 Flying Instructors School RAF detachment between February and April 1942 became No. 2 Flying Instructors School (Advanced) RAF detachment between April and November 1942 became No. 19 (Pilots) Advanced Flying Unit RAF (October 1942 - February 1944)
- No. 7 Gliding School RAF (July 1944 - September 1955)
- No. 8 Flying Training School RAF (May - July 1951) became No. 8 Advanced Flying Training School RAF (July 1951 - December 1953)
- No. 13 (Fighter) Group RAF (December 1945 - May 1946)
- No. 13 Group Anti-Aircraft Co-operation Flight RAF (August - October 1941)
- No. 13 Group Communication Flight RAF (December 1945 - May 1946)
- No. 41 Squadron RAF between 1 and 15 April 1946 with the Spitfire F.21
- No. 63 Squadron RAF detachment during 1942 with the Mustang I
- No. 88 (Hong Kong) Squadron RAF detachment during 1943 with the Boston IIIA
- No. 122 (Bombay) Squadron RAF between January and April 1946 re-equipping with the Spitfire F.21
- No. 614 (County of Glamorgan) Squadron RAuxAF detachment during 1941 with the Lysander II
- No. 662 Gliding School RAF detachment (March - December 1968)
- No. 663 Gliding School RAF (May - November 1968)

The airport was opened for civil operations in 1947. British European Airways, one of the predecessors of British Airways, commenced flights to London-Heathrow in the mid-1970s using a combination of Hawker Siddeley Trident jets and Vickers Viscounts. In the late 1970s and early 1980s there were two daily flights between Inverness and Heathrow; however, the route was discontinued in 1983 on the grounds of poor financial performance. Dan-Air inherited the service and offered a three-times daily service. The airline sustained the route adding links to London-Gatwick and Manchester in the late 1980s; however, these new services proved not to be successful and were discontinued.

When Dan Air was bought by British Airways in 1992, the flag carrier retained the service for a further five years, adding a fourth daily frequency shortly before withdrawing the link, amid considerable controversy and public anger, in autumn 1997. British Airways transferred the London service to Gatwick, operated by its subsidiary on a three-times daily basis using lower capacity BAe 146 regional jets. The emergence of EasyJet as a force in UK aviation coincided with the launch of a daily service to London-Luton in 1996. Other destinations and airlines were added including; (Belfast, Birmingham, Bristol, East Midlands, Leeds/Bradford, Liverpool, Manchester and Newcastle), particularly after 2003, where HIAL's marketing efforts were assisted by route development fund support from the Scottish Executive. The Heathrow link was reinstated at a daily frequency in 2004 by BMI; however, the service was discontinued in March 2008, the airline citing rising costs at Heathrow as the reason.

Since 1974, Inverness has been serviced weekly by non-commercial routes with Lorient (the 1st fishing port of France) in South Brittany. The companies Air Lorient, Diwan (Air Provence International) and Air Bretagne ensured the transport of sailors to the advanced bases in Scotland. Since 2005, Air ITM (Groupe Intermarché) has offered repatriation and replacement of sailors with a Hawker 400 jet aircraft.

=== Development since 2009 ===
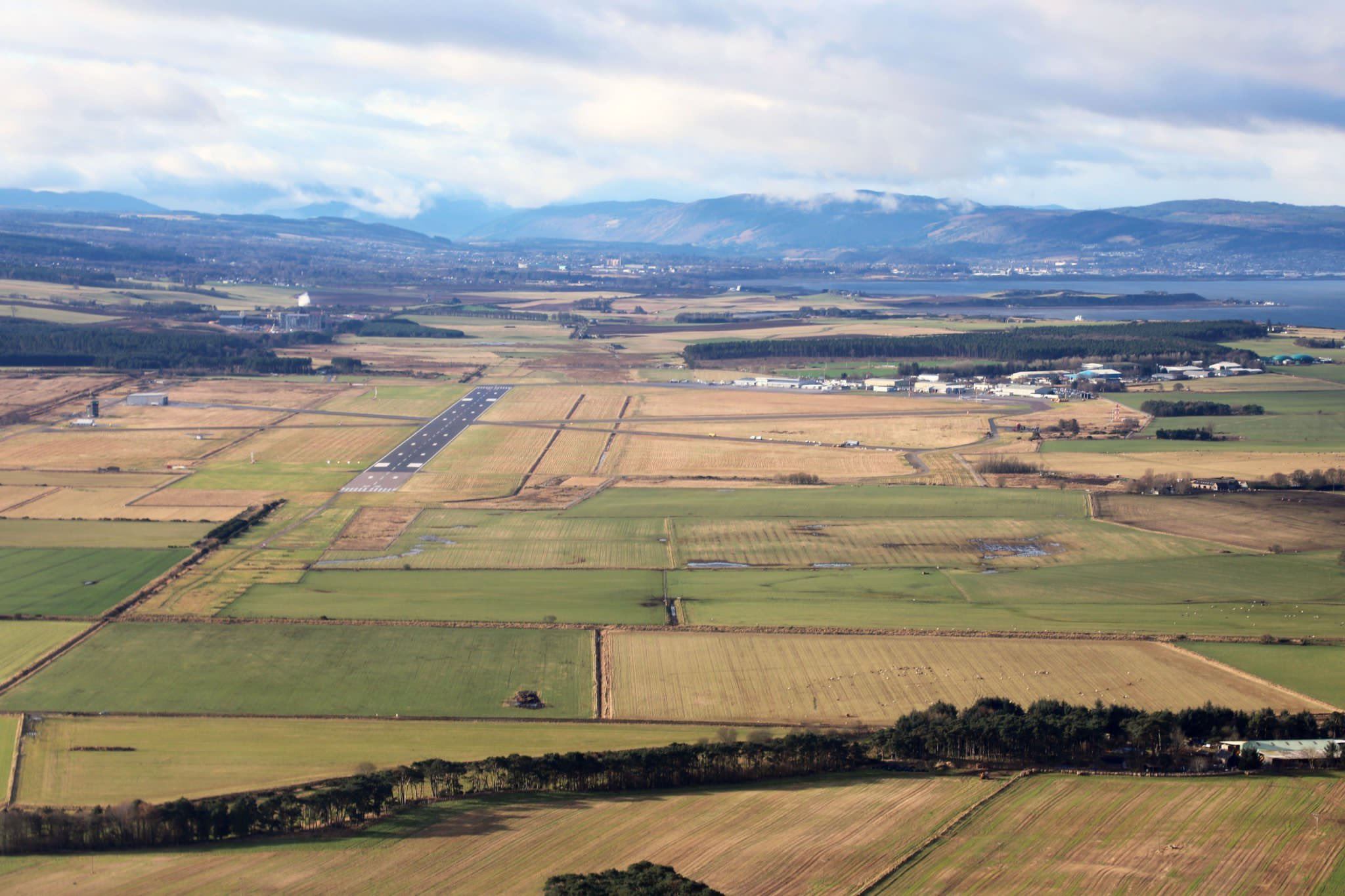
Aerial view

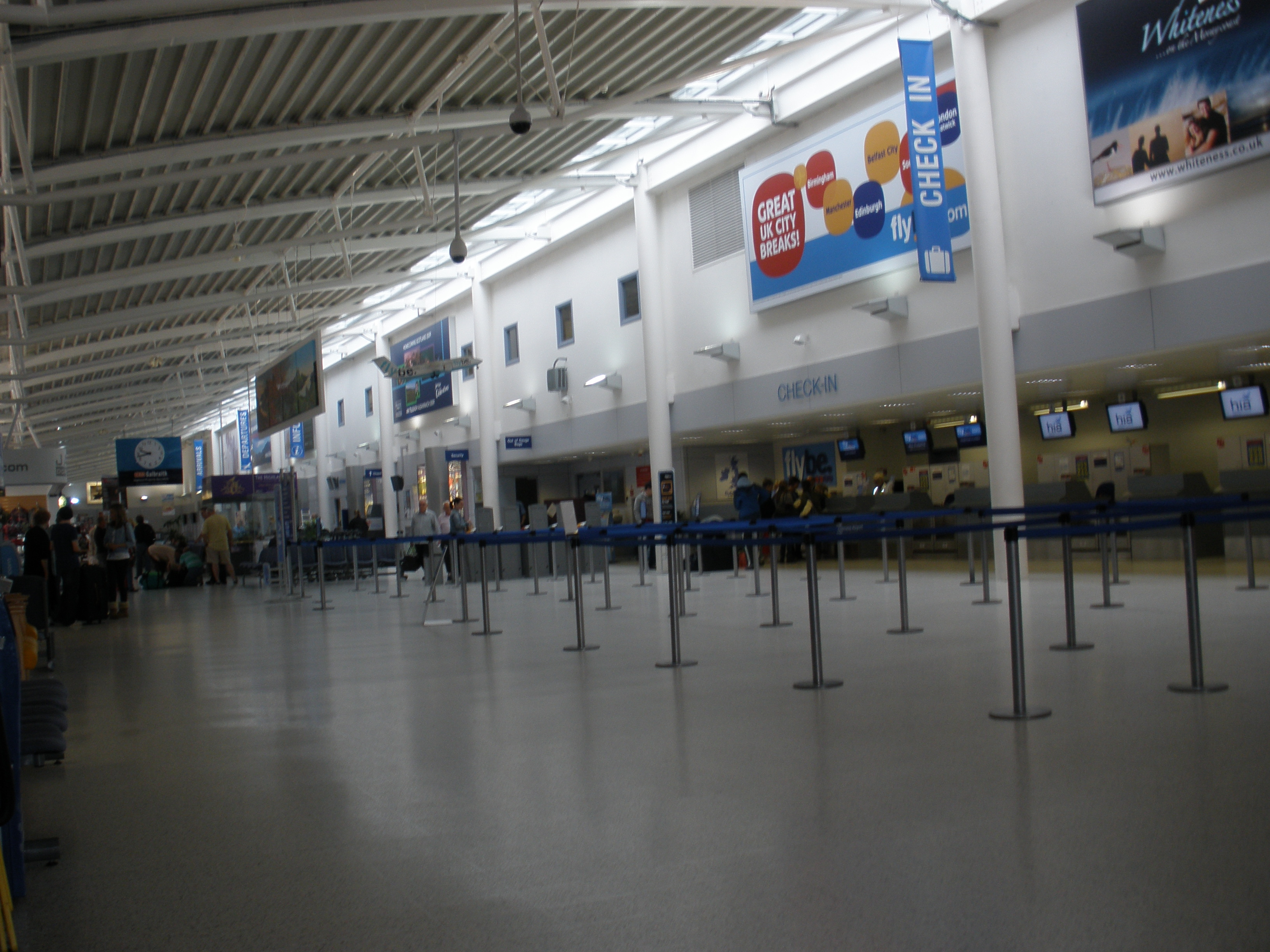
Terminal interior

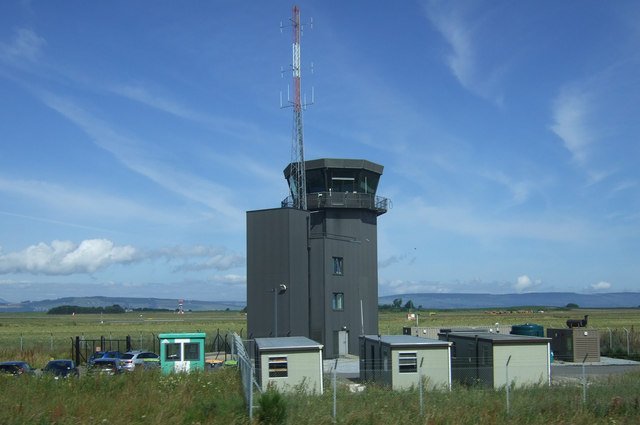
Air traffic control tower

In 2004, Thomson Holidays launched a short series of peak season charter flights to Palma de Mallorca, Ibiza and Lanzarote using Spanair aircraft, flights to Palma were maintained (and Reus was added for a couple of seasons) through to 2010. Newmarket Holidays still operates various charters from Inverness on selected dates throughout the year. In June 2017 Thomson Holidays returned with peak seasonal flights to Palma once more, using a chartered Air Europa Boeing 737-800.

Ryanair cut its last routes to East Midlands and Liverpool in June 2009. Eastern Airways launched services to Manchester and Birmingham. However, when Flybe started flying the same routes in 2008, Eastern decided to withdraw.

International scheduled services proved difficult to successfully establish until the late 2000s, when a weekly seasonal service between Düsseldorf and Inverness commenced in summer 2009, operated by Lufthansa CityLine, and in 2011 when Flybe commenced daily operations to Amsterdam. The now-defunct Snowflake (a low-cost subsidiary of SAS) operated a twice-weekly service to Stockholm in the summer of 2004, however the service was withdrawn after a short period of operation, owing to lack of demand. KLM uk operated a daily service to Amsterdam via Edinburgh in 1997 but this was short-lived, lasting only a few months. ScotAirways launched a service to Amsterdam in 2001; however, this was withdrawn following the events of 11 September. A four-times-weekly service to Dublin was operated by Aer Arann between 2006 and 2008, before being withdrawn owing to escalating fuel prices.

The airport terminal is notable as an early example of the Public-private partnership favoured by the UK Government. HIAL was criticised for a PFI deal signed to build a new terminal at Inverness Airport. The deal signed by HIAL meant it had to pay £3.50 for every passenger flying from the airport to the PFI operator. In 2006, the PFI deal was cancelled, costing the Scottish Executive £27.5 million.

The airport is a hub on the Highlands and Islands network where flights between the islands, and other UK and European destinations connect. easyJet is currently the largest operator at Inverness, followed by Loganair.

The south apron, the main parking area for aircraft, was upgraded in May 2012 to improve access to the terminal by long-range aircraft. In November 2013 the airport's mile long runway was resurfaced and the taxiway extended, providing a link to the site of the Inverness Airport Business Park. However, the Business Park has struggled to become established.

On 3 May 2016, British Airways reinstated daily flights to Heathrow after an absence of 19 years. In the same month KLM Cityhopper launched daily flights to Amsterdam. Following the success of the route, it was increased to twice daily from March 2017. From March 2018, British Airways increased their flights to Heathrow from 7 to 10 weekly. Dalcross Handling, a local company, is the airline ground handler while Swissport operates the 'Aspire' business lounge in the Departure Lounge.

In anticipation of the greatly increased passenger capacity, HIAL announced a major expansion of the terminal building. This consisted of expansion of the departure lounge for additional seating and retail outlets, an extension containing a new international arrivals area, and an enlarged security search area.

On 13 November 2017, Loganair announced two new routes; a seasonal route to Norwich twice a week over the peak summer months, though this was scrapped three months before the planned launch. A new direct year-round service to Bergen was also announced. This service would operate 3 times weekly and would use the same BMI aircraft as the Manchester route, which allows same-plane service to Bergen for passengers from Manchester, along with the Inverness passengers.

In July 2018, HIAL announced that it was running an online poll to gauge public response to the idea of changing the airport's name to "Inverness Loch Ness Airport" to help boost tourism. However the public rejected the name change with 88% of those surveyed against it.

A planning permission application was lodged for a 130-room development to be built at the Inverness Airport Business Park, near to the airport, that could provide hotel facilities. Construction commenced in January 2019, with the Courtyard by Marriott hotel finally opening in March 2020.

In 2021, HIAL released a master plan for development of the airport up to the year 2045. Plans include extending runway 05/23 by 323 metres (1,060 ft) and construction of a new passenger terminal adjacent to the then proposed Inverness Airport railway station.

On 15 January 2026, Aer Lingus Regional (operated by Emerald Airlines) announced a new twice weekly service between Dublin and Inverness. The route will be operated on Thursdays and Sundays, and will commence on 21 May 2026.

== Future ==
Highlands and Islands Airports have proposed the rebuilding of the terminal to accommodate a projected increase in passenger numbers to 1.8 million by 2045. The most expensive option, priced at between £34 and £55 million, would involve relocating the terminal buildings such that they are adjacent to the planned Dalcross railway station. An alternative proposal would see the existing terminal extended at a cost of £19 to £31 million. The Scottish Greens criticised the proposals, suggesting that the existing airport was adequate and that money should be invested in improving rail and bus links in the region instead.

== Airlines and destinations ==
The following airlines operate regular scheduled flights to and from Inverness:

Airlines	Destinations
Aer Lingus	Dublin
airBaltic	Seasonal charter: Gran Canaria, Tenerife–South (begins 26 March 2027)
British Airways	London–Heathrow
Discover Airlines	Seasonal: Frankfurt (begins 19 June 2027)
easyJet	Birmingham, Bristol, London–Gatwick, London–Luton
KLM	Amsterdam
Loganair	Belfast–City, Kirkwall, Manchester, Stornoway, Sumburgh; Seasonal: Bergen (Note: Bergen service is a continuation of the Kirkwall service as the same flight number)
TUI Airways	Seasonal: Palma de Mallorca

== Statistics ==
Inverness Airport had 821,139 passengers in 2025, which was an increase of 3% from 2024. Gatwick Airport was again the most popular destination with 228,901 passengers. This route accounts for around 28 percent of all passenger traffic at Inverness Airport, with all London routes combined accounting for over 65 percent of passenger traffic. Shown below are the top ten destinations in 2025.

Busiest routes from Inverness (2025)
Rank	Destination	Passengers	Change 2024/25
1	London-Gatwick	228,901	▲3%
2	London-Heathrow	175,605	▲10%
3	London-Luton	146,364	▲4%
4	Amsterdam	97,102	▼3%
5	Bristol	92,472	Steady
6	Manchester	28,004	Steady
7	Stornoway	19,431	▲24%
8	Sumburgh	13,552	▼11%
9	Belfast-City	12,776	▼16%
10	Palma de Mallorca	2,942	Steady
Source: CAA Statistics

== Ground transport ==
=== Bus ===
Bus services operate between Inverness Airport, Inverness, Nairn and Elgin. Stagecoach in Inverness run between the airport and Inverness city centre close to the railway station.

=== Rail ===
Inverness Airport Railway Station on the Aberdeen-Inverness line opened on 2 February 2023 and serves the airport with a half-hourly bus connecting the two.

A new station at the airport was first approved in February 2017. In May 2021 Highland Council granted planning permission to Network Rail for a new two-platform station at the airport, but expressed reservations as a level crossing would be replaced with a bridge inaccessible to disabled people. One councillor, who noted the new bridge clashed with Transport Scotland guidance, described it as "low-quality infrastructure" and said it was "deeply shocking that we are getting infrastructure like that still [being] built."

=== Road ===
The airport is 7 NM (13 km; 8.1 mi) northeast of the city of Inverness just off the main A96 Aberdeen-Inverness trunk road.

Access from the A96 was previously by a single track road (suitable only for smaller vehicles) or alternatively by the B9093 Ardersier road. When the airport installed the new instrument landing system, the single track road had to be closed altogether. In April 2006 a new road, Inverness Airport Way, was opened providing full access to all vehicles from the airport direct to the A96. However most traffic still uses the old Ardersier road as it is far quicker. The new road skirts the western perimeter of the airport in a large loop and is provided with 'wig-wag' signals if road traffic needs to be stopped during aircraft landing/take off.

Taxis are available directly in front of the terminal building.

== Highland Aviation Museum ==
This museum was situated in the Dalcross Industrial Estate immediately adjacent to the airport. It had 3 full aircraft (Hawker Hunter F.1 WT660, Blackburn Buccaneer S1 XK532 and Panavia Tornado GR1 ZA362) and several aircraft noses on display including Nimrod XV254. The museum was open to the public at weekends and bank holidays. Permanently closed from October 2019 with the aircraft sold on, XK532 remains on site with a more recent addition of Jet Provost T5A XW375.

== Accidents and incidents ==
- On 19 November 1984, a EuroAir Embraer EMB 110 Bandeirante, registered as G-HGGS, crashed into the side of a hill 6.5 mi (10.5 km) south of the airport. The pilot was killed in the crash and the aircraft damaged beyond repair. The plane was scheduled to deliver 2,346 lb (1,064 kg) of mail to Edinburgh and took off at 20:55. Eyewitness accounts say a "dying orange glow" was seen in the area approximately 4 minutes after take-off. The AAIB report concludes that there was insufficient evidence to determine a cause to a reasonable amount of certainty.
- On 19 January 2015, a Flybe Bombardier Dash 8 Q400 made an "uncontrollable slide" while the plane was exiting the runway. The AAIB investigation concluded that the incident was caused by a number of factors including the taxiway being wet with de-icing fluid, some patches of ice still existing on the tarmac and the plane having a "slightly higher than normal taxi speed". No one was injured and no damage was done to the aircraft.
