= Dalcross railway station =

Disused railway station in Highland, Scotland

Dalcross

General information
- Location: Dalcross, Highland; Scotland
- Coordinates: 57.5267°N 4.0707°W
- Grid reference: NH761503
- Platforms: 2

Other information
- Status: Closed

History
- Original company: Inverness and Nairn Railway
- Pre-grouping: Highland Railway
- Post-grouping: London, Midland and Scottish Railway

Key dates
- 5 November 1855: Opened
- 3 May 1965: Closed
- 2 February 2023: Inverness Airport opened nearby
Location

Dalcross was a railway station located at Dalcross, to the east of Inverness, Scotland (now in the Highland Council Area). It opened in 1855 and closed in 1965. A new station in Dalcross was opened on 2 February 2023.

== Original station ==
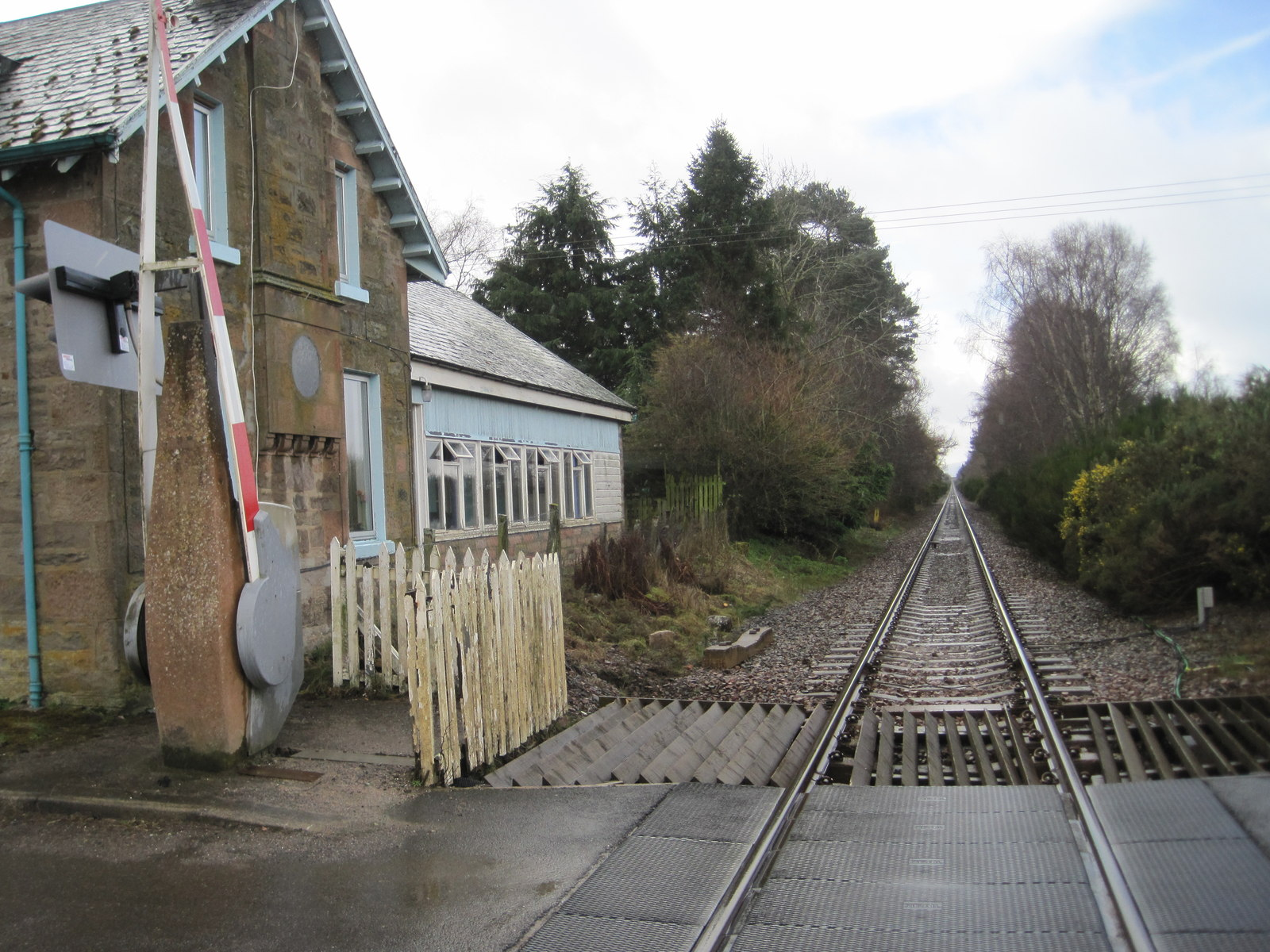
The site of the original station in 2015

The Inverness and Nairn Railway was formally opened on 5 November 1855, public services beginning the following day, and Dalcross was one of the four intermediate stations originally provided. In September 1925, the distances of the station were given as 137 miles 10 chains (220.7 km) from Perth (measured via Dava), and 48 miles 6 chains (77.4 km) from Keith Junction.

Dalcross station closed on 3 May 1965, and the signal box closed on 12 March 1967. The station building remains however and is now a private residence. The level crossing at the eastern end of the station is now equipped with automatic half-barriers, and is 137 miles 17 chains (220.8 km) from Perth (via Dava).

== New station ==
A new station, Inverness Airport railway station, which is close to the site of the former Dalcross station was opened on 2 February 2023, being part of the Aberdeen–Inverness line.

== Services ==
	Historical railways	
Gollanfield Junction; Station closed; Line open	Inverness and Nairn Railway	Castle Stuart Platform; Station closed; Line open

== Sources ==
- Butt, R. V. J. (October 1995). The Directory of Railway Stations: details every public and private passenger station, halt, platform and stopping place, past and present (1st ed.). Sparkford: Patrick Stephens Ltd. ISBN 978-1-85260-508-7. OCLC 60251199. OL 11956311M.
- Catford, Nick (20 April 2010). "Dalcross Station". Disused Stations.
- Pringle, Gordon (22 October 2010). "Aberdeen to Inverness Rail Improvement" (PDF). Network Rail. Archived from the original (PDF) on 20 August 2011.
- Vallance, H.A.; Clinker, C.R.; Lambert, Anthony J. (1985) [1938]. The Highland Railway (4th ed.). Newton Abbot: David & Charles. ISBN 0-946537-24-0.
- Yonge, John (December 2007) [1987]. Jacobs, Gerald (ed.). Railway Track Diagrams 1: Scotland & Isle of Man (5th ed.). Bradford on Avon: Trackmaps. ISBN 978-0-9549866-3-6.
- "Rail Users Group - Issues for Consideration by HITRANS RAG Meeting". The Friends of the Far North Line - Newsletter. May 2009.
- "Strategic Transport Projects Review - Report 3 Generation, Sifting and Appraisal of Interventions - Annex 2" (PDF). Transport Scotland. 18 November 2008. Archived from the original (PDF) on 10 March 2012.
- "Talks on new rail stations at Kintore and Dalcross". BBC News Highlands & Islands. 10 February 2011.
