= Castle Stuart Platform railway station =

Former railway station in Scotland

Coordinates: 57.51645°N 4.09514°W

Castle Stuart Platform
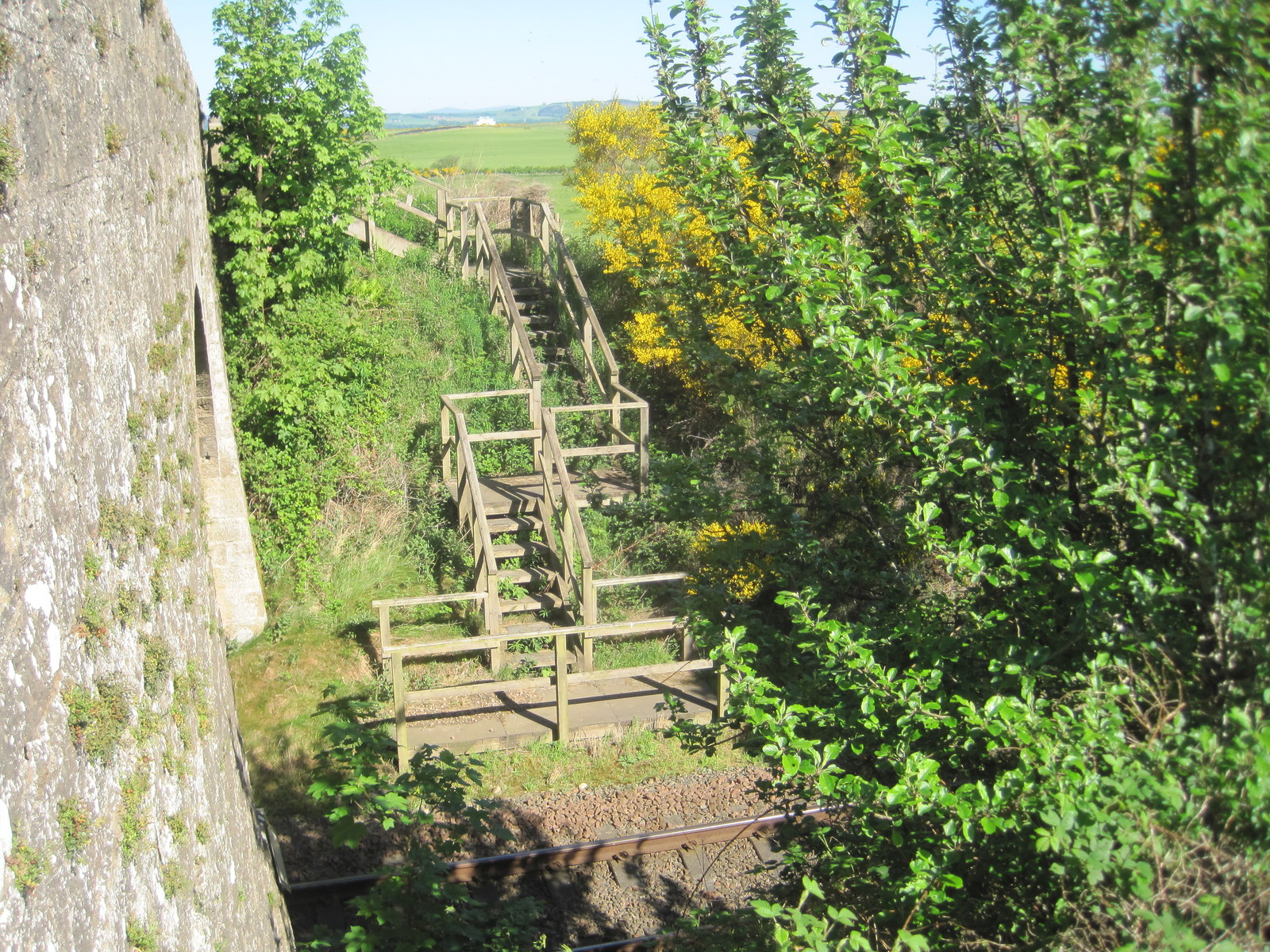
- The site of the station in 2017

General information
- Location: Castle Stuart, Highland; Scotland
- Platforms: 1

Other information
- Status: Disused

History
- Original company: Inverness and Nairn Railway
- Pre-grouping: Highland Railway
- Post-grouping: London, Midland and Scottish Railway

Key dates
- 7 November 1855: Open
- 1938: Closed
Location

Castle Stuart Platform was a railway station located near Castle Stuart, to the east of Inverness, now in Highland council area. Opened in 1855 to serve Castle Stuart, the ancestral home of the Earls of Moray, it wasn't listed in public timetables and closed 1938. The structure was still extant as late as 1951, but no trace of it now remains.

| Preceding station | Historical railways | Following station |
|---|---|---|
| Dalcross; Station closed; Line open | Inverness and Nairn Railway | Allanfearn; Station closed; Line open |
