= Auldearn railway station =

Disused railway station in Highland, Scotland

Coordinates: 57.58996°N 3.81066°W

Auldearn

General information
- Location: Auldearn, Highland; Scotland
- Platforms: 2

Other information
- Status: Disused

History
- Original company: Highland Railway
- Pre-grouping: Highland Railway
- Post-grouping: London, Midland and Scottish Railway

Key dates
- 9 December 1895: Station opened
- 6 June 1960: Station Closed
Location

Auldearn was a railway station located near Nairn, in the Scottish administrative area of Highland. The station was on the line from Aberdeen to Inverness.

== History ==
Opened by the Highland Railway, it became part of the London, Midland and Scottish Railway during the Grouping of 1923. The line then passed on to the Scottish Region of British Railways on nationalisation in 1948. It was then closed by the British Transport Commission.

== The site today ==
Trains still pass the site on the Aberdeen to Inverness Line.

Preceding station	Historical railways	Following station
Brodie; Line open, Station closed	London, Midland and Scottish Railway; Highland Railway	Nairn; Line and station open
