= Forres railway station =

Railway station in Moray, Scotland

Forres Scottish Gaelic: Farrais
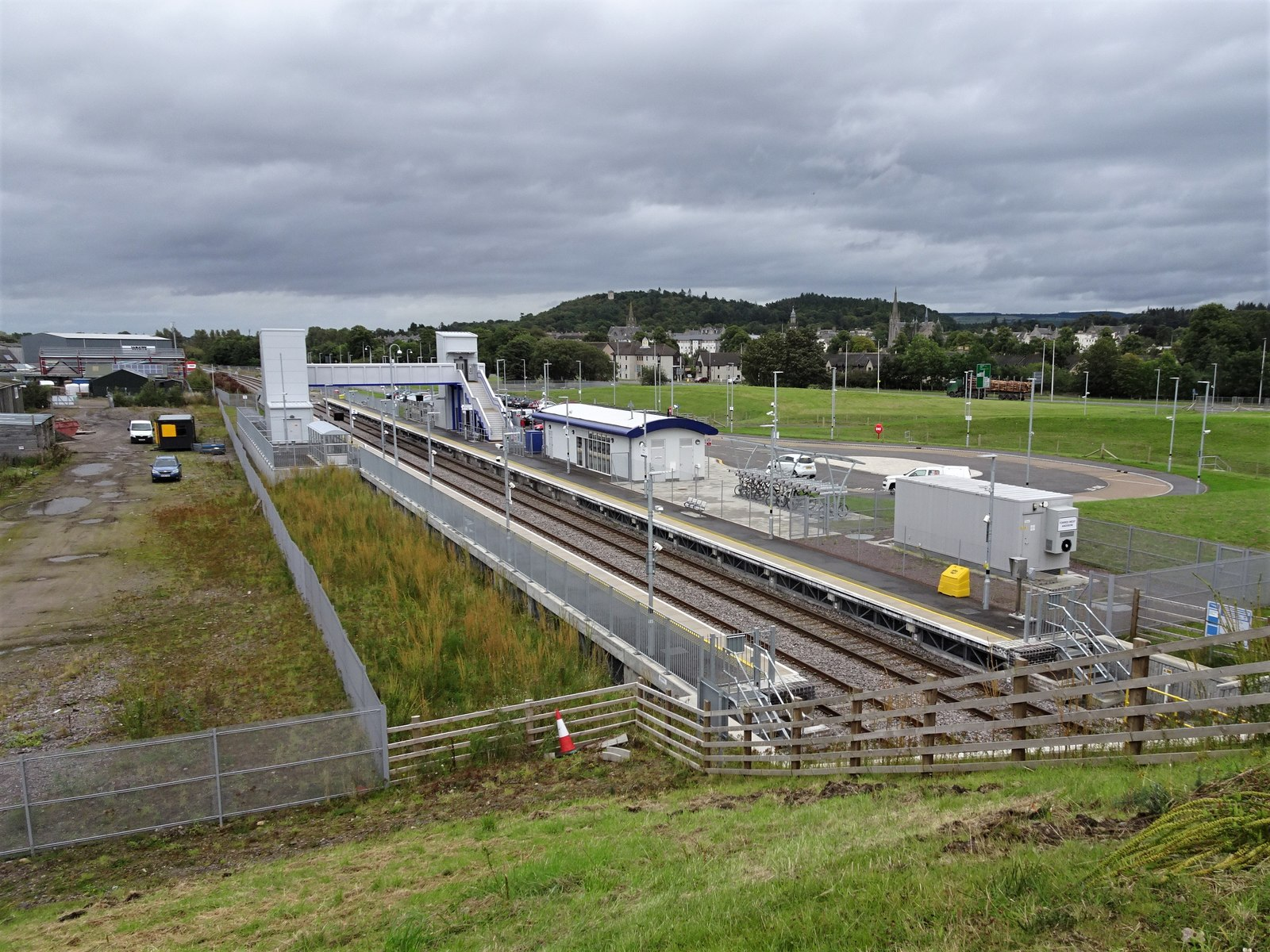
- The new station in 2019, looking eastward towards Elgin and Aberdeen

General information
- Location: Forres, Moray; Scotland
- Coordinates: 57.61116°N 3.6242°W
- Grid reference: NJ029589
- Manager: ScotRail
- Platforms: 2

Other information
- Station code: FOR

History
- Original company: Inverness and Aberdeen Junction Railway
- Pre-grouping: Highland Railway
- Post-grouping: LMS

Key dates
- 25 March 1858: Opened by Inverness and Aberdeen Junction Railway
- 3 August 1863: Station reopened by Highland Railway
- 5 October 2017: Old station closed
- 17 October 2017: New relocated station opened

Passengers
- 2020/21: ▼32,890
- 2021/22: ▲92,636
- 2022/23: ▲97,030
- 2023/24: ▲0.130 million
- 2024/25: ▲0.131 million
Location
Notes
- Passenger statistics from the Office of Rail and Road

Forres railway station serves the town of Forres, Moray in Scotland. The station is managed and served by ScotRail and is on the Aberdeen–Inverness line, between Nairn and Elgin, measured 119 miles 42 chains (192.4 km) from Perth via the Dava route.

== History ==
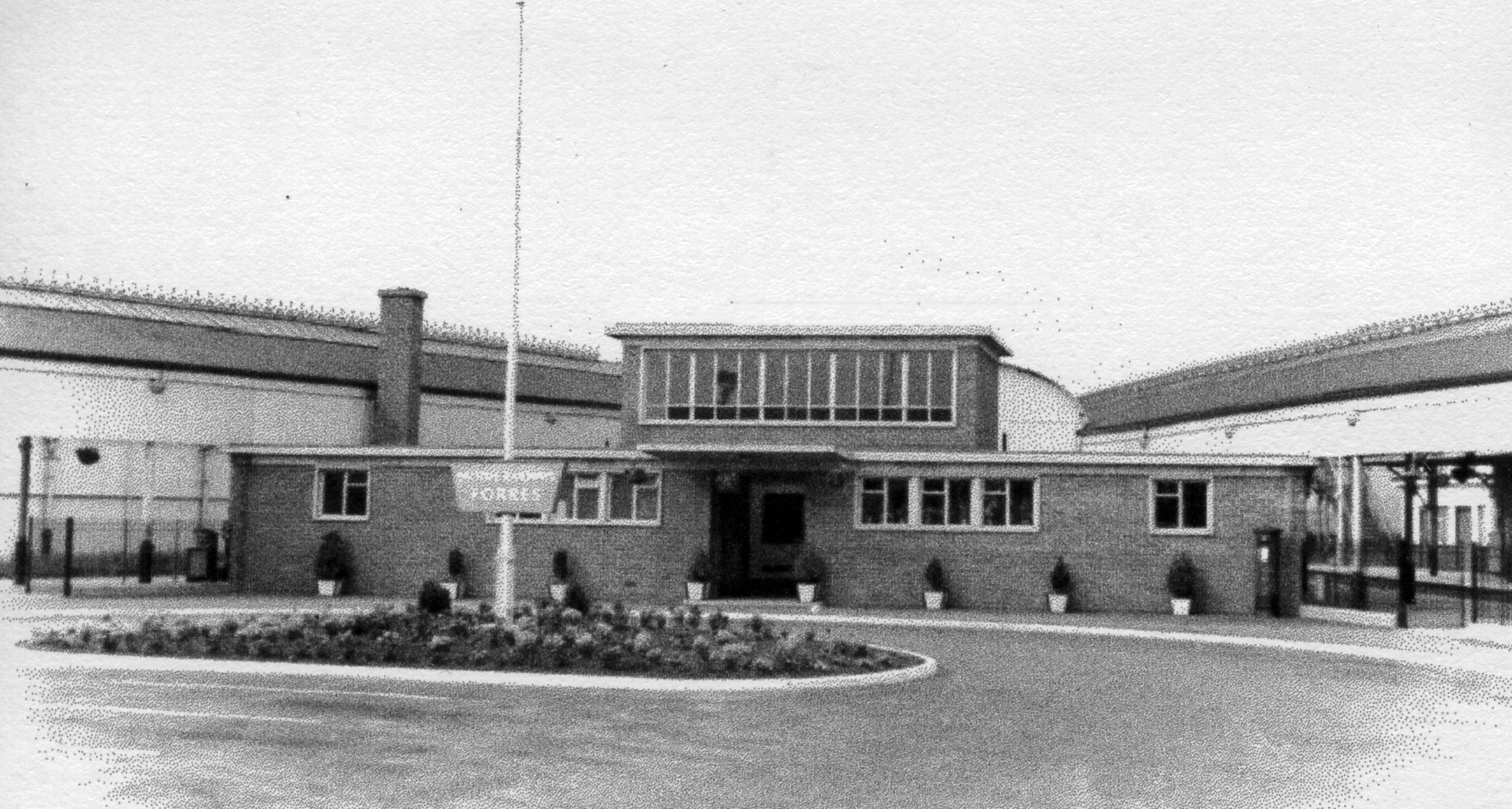
Forres station, as rebuilt 1956

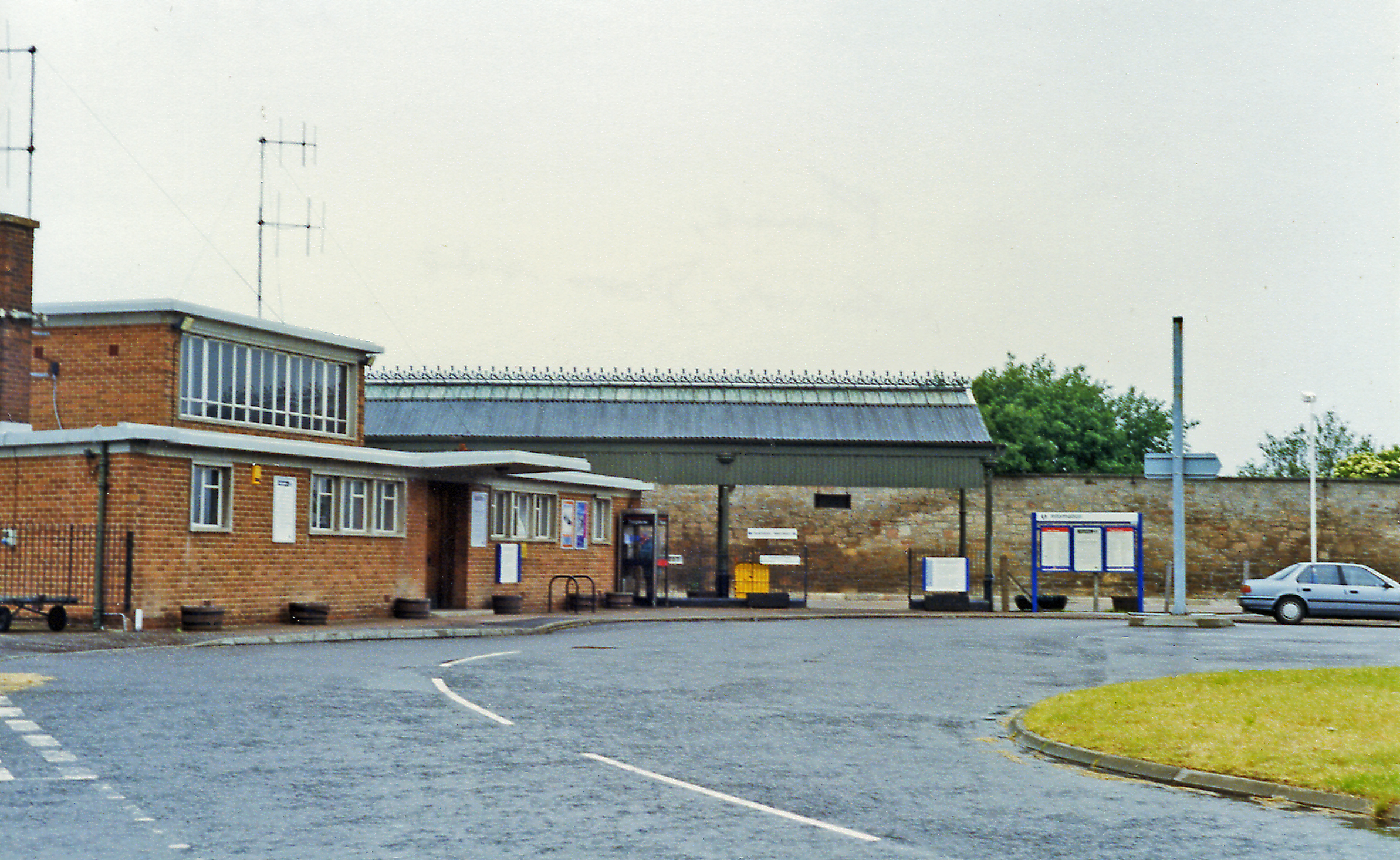
The 1956 station in 1997

There have been three stations at Forres.

The Inverness and Aberdeen Junction Railway (I&AJR), a line linking the Inverness and Nairn Railway at Nairn to the Great North of Scotland Railway (GNoSR) at Keith, was opened in stages. The central section, between Dalvey (a temporary station about half-way between Brodie and Forres) and Elgin opened on 25 March 1858, and on the same day the first railway station in Forres was opened. The station building was located between the current track and signal box, and the former goods loop (which was the original main line, before the junction was constructed).

The Inverness and Perth Junction Railway (I&PJR), a line linking the I&AJR to the Perth and Dunkeld Railway at Dunkeld, was also opened in stages. It was decided to begin the new line at Forres, which being approximately half-way between Inverness and Keith, would not favour one end of the existing line over the other in terms of share of traffic to and from the south. Therefore, so that trains from the south could run both westwards towards Inverness and eastwards towards Keith, a triangular junction was constructed at Forres, together with a new station having platforms on all three sides. The reconstruction made it necessary to divert the east-west route of the I&AJR a little to the south of the original Forres station. The northernmost section of the I&PJR, between Forres and Aviemore opened on 3 August 1863 together with the new station. Although the original I&AJR station was closed to passengers at this time, the line through it remained in use as a goods loop. This second station was 30 miles 20 chains (48.7 km) from Keith Junction, and 119 miles 24 chains (192.0 km) from Perth.} Four of these five railways – the GNoSR excepted – amalgamated with one another in stages between 1861 and 1865, becoming the Highland Railway (HR) from 29 June 1865. In 1898, the HR opened a new direct route between Inverness and Aviemore, over which most of the traffic from Inverness to the south was diverted, and consequently the importance of Forres was reduced.

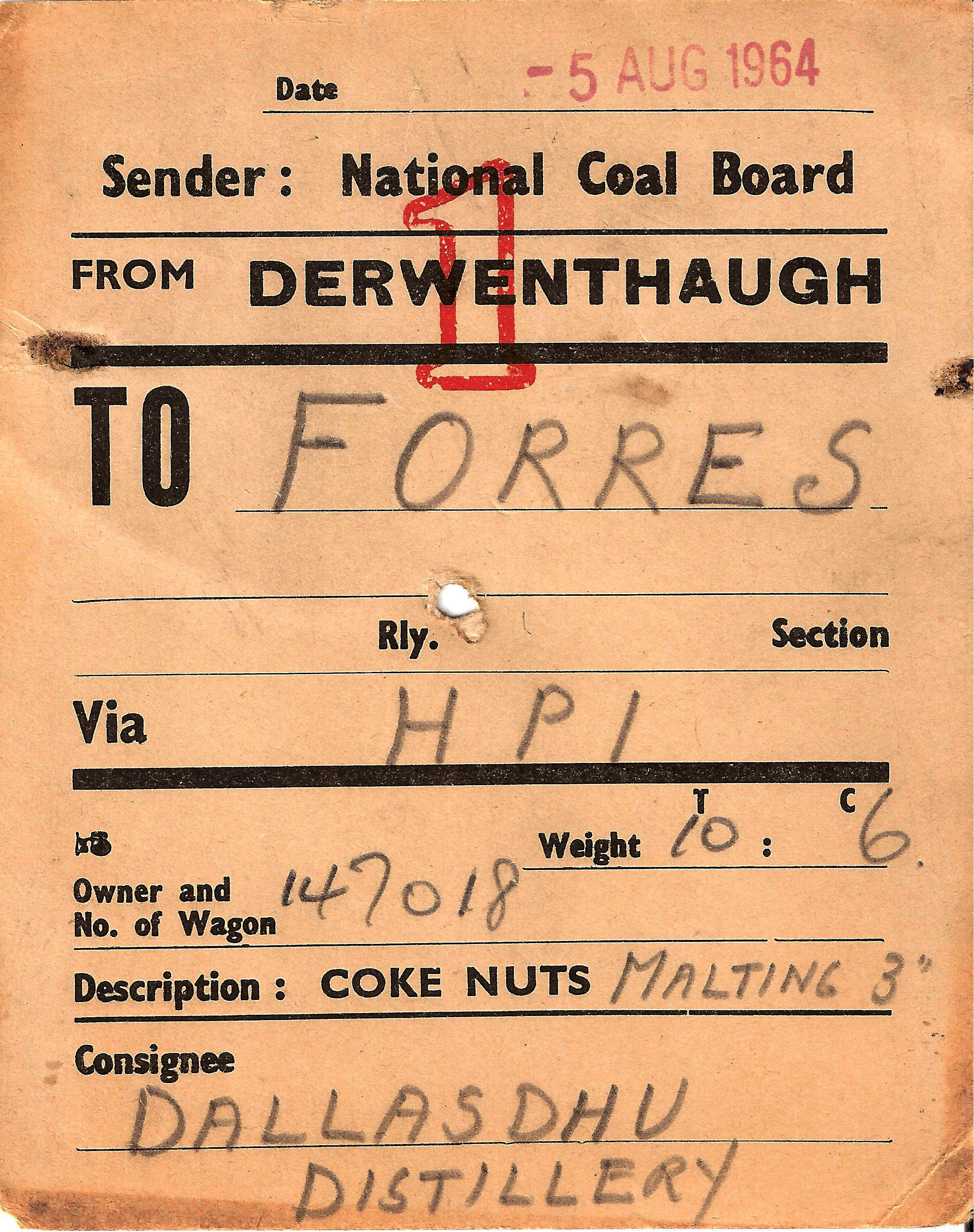
Wagon label from 1964 for a delivery of coke nuts to Dallas Dhu Distillery from Derwenthaugh Coke Works near Newcastle upon Tyne.

During 1954–55, the station building was replaced with a new red brick building. This included a new ticket office, toilets and waiting rooms.

The line between Forres and Aviemore, including the eastern and western sides of the triangle, was closed to passengers from 18 October 1965. This line, as far south as the Dallas Dhu distillery siding (117 mi 64 chains (189.6 km) from Perth), remained open for goods trains for a while longer; the west curve at Forres was closed to all traffic from 15 August 1966, and the south signal box taken out of use at the same time, whilst the last section, between Dallas Dhu siding and Forres East Junction, was officially closed from 30 June 1967, although no services had run since 21 May. On 28 May 1967, the double-track stretch between the east and west junctions at Forres was reduced to a single line, and the west signal box taken out of use.

In March 2014, after lengthy discussions in Scottish Parliament to replace the old station at Forres with a brand new reconfigured station equipped with double platforms, Transport Scotland confirmed a £170 million infrastructure improvement project for the Aberdeen–Inverness line, to be completed by 2030. Included in this project were plans to re-site the station at Forres with an extended passing loop, along with signalling improvements. Further signalling and infrastructure improvements along the line were also announced, including the construction of two additional stations.

Plans for the new Forres station were revealed at a public meeting in March 2016 and initial construction work and track laying commenced in the summer of 2016. This third station is located on the original I&AJR line, some distance to the west of the first station. Once the new station was completed, the original Highland Railway station closed on 5 October 2017, after the last train of the night. The level crossing and signal box at Forres were also closed and all three structures were subsequently demolished. The new station opened on 17 October 2017 and track signalling was then transferred to a signalling centre in Inverness.

== Facilities ==
The second station was provided with a locomotive depot including a turntable, situated between the station and the original I&AJR line. There were ten locomotives allocated to the depot in July 1919: four of the Strath Class 4-4-0; two of the Duke Class 4-4-0; and one each of the Banking Tank Class 0-6-4T, the Small Ben Class 4-4-0, the Small Goods Class 2-4-0, and the Yankee Tank Class 4-4-0T. The provision of the Banking Tank was to assist trains up the 15-mile (24 km) climb to Dava summit, along which gradients as steep as 1 in 75 (13.3‰) were encountered. On one evening goods train each day, the banker was not detached at Dava, but continued through to Grantown-on-Spey, from where it could assist a northbound train the following morning. A second Banking Tank was provided at Forres in 1921. In January 1935, the LMS reorganised its motive power depot structure, and codes were allocated to the depots. Under this scheme, Forres was given the code 29K. By September 1935, the number of locomotives allocated to Forres had increased to eleven: six of the Small Ben Class 4-4-0, two of the Loch Class 4-4-0 and one each of the Banking Tank Class 0-6-4T, the Big Ben Class 4-4-0 and the LMS Fowler Class 3F 0-6-0T. Of these, the class with the greatest wheelbase was the Loch class, at 44 ft 9 in (13.64 m) including tender. The diameter of the turntable was recorded as 44 feet 8 inches (13.61 m) in 1881; 50 ft 3 in (15.32 m) in 1901; 48 ft 6 in (14.78 m) in 1920; and 50 ft 0 in (15.24 m) in 1948. By 1948, the LMS depot code had been amended to 32C, and when British Railways expanded the LMS codes to cover the whole network in 1949, Forres became 60E. The allocation had been reduced to five locomotives (all former Caledonian Railway types) by 1950, increasing to six by 1959. The depot was closed in May 1959, at which time only four locomotives remained.

The station has two platforms (linked by footbridge), with the ticket office and waiting room on platform 1 (both platforms are reversibly signalled). The main road that used to cross the line at Forres East level crossing has been diverted onto a new overbridge and a new larger car park provided. A shelter is located on platform 2, whilst both have customer help points, CIS displays, timetable boards and automated announcements to offer train running details.

== Passenger volume ==
Passenger Volume at Forres
	2004–05	2005–06	2006–07	2007–08	2008–09	2009–10	2010–11	2011–12	2012–13	2013–14	2014–15	2015–16	2016–17	2017–18	2018–19	2019–20	2020–21	2021–22	2022–23	2023–24	2024–25
Entries and exits	94,943	99,145	95,751	93,726	99,516	103,250	111,222	113,976	118,288	124,111	131,398	130,658	123,298	118,036	126,290	141,000	32,890	92,636	97,030	129,646	131,372

The statistics cover twelve month periods that start in April.

== Services ==
As of May 2026, there are seventeen daily departures from the station each way on weekdays and Saturdays. Most are through trains between Aberdeen and Inverness, but some trains start from or terminate at Elgin. One departure runs through to Edinburgh in the morning. On Sundays there are five through trains each way.

Both Transport Scotland and ScotRail had plans to improve service levels between Inverness and Elgin (to a base hourly frequency) from late 2018.

Preceding station	National Rail	Following station
Elgin	ScotRail; Aberdeen–Inverness line	Nairn
	Historical railways	
Rafford; Line closed; station closed	Highland Railway; Inverness and Perth Junction Railway	Connection to Inverness and Aberdeen; Junction Railway
Kinloss; Line open; station closed	Highland Railway; Inverness and Aberdeen Junction Railway	Brodie; Line open; station closed

== Bibliography ==
- Bolger, Paul (January 1983). BR Steam Motive Power Depots: ScR. Shepperton: Ian Allan. ISBN 0-7110-1248-2. CE/0183.
- Brailsford, Martyn, ed. (December 2017) [1987]. Railway Track Diagrams 1: Scotland & Isle of Man (6th ed.). Frome: Trackmaps. ISBN 978-0-9549866-9-8.
- Butt, R. V. J. (October 1995). The Directory of Railway Stations: details every public and private passenger station, halt, platform and stopping place, past and present (1st ed.). Sparkford: Patrick Stephens Ltd. ISBN 978-1-85260-508-7. OCLC 60251199. OL 11956311M.
- Cormack, J.R.H.; Stevenson, J.L. (1988). Greenwood, William (ed.). Highland Railway Locomotives Book 1: Early Days to the 'Lochs'. Locomotives of the LMS. Lincoln: RCTS. ISBN 0-901115-64-9.
- Cormack, J.R.H.; Stevenson, J.L. (1990). Greenwood, William (ed.). Highland Railway Locomotives Book 2: The Drummond, Smith & Cumming Classes. Locomotives of the LMS. Lincoln: RCTS. ISBN 0-901115-72-X.
- Jowett, Alan (March 1989). Jowett's Railway Atlas of Great Britain and Ireland: From Pre-Grouping to the Present Day (1st ed.). Sparkford: Patrick Stephens Ltd. ISBN 978-1-85260-086-0. OCLC 22311137.
- Sinclair, Neil T. (2005). Highland Railway: People and Places - From the Inverness and Nairn Railway to Scotrail. Breedon Books Publishing Co Ltd. ISBN 1-85983-453-1.
- Vallance, H.A.; Clinker, C.R.; Lambert, Anthony J. (1985) [1938]. The Highland Railway (4th ed.). Newton Abbot: David & Charles. ISBN 0-946537-24-0.
- Whitehouse, Patrick; Thomas, David St John (1987). LMS 150: The London Midland and Scottish Railway - A Century and a Half of Progress. Newton Abbot: David & Charles. ISBN 0-7153-8740-5. 01LO49.
- "Regional Transport Strategy for the Highlands & Islands" (PDF).
- "Moray Development Plan, Forres Settlement Statement" (PDF). from 2001, with station developments mentioned as part of a flood protection scheme.
- "Aberdeen to Inverness Rail Improvements Project" (PDF).
