= Brodie, Moray =

Coordinates: 57.593126154°N 3.708974439°W

Brodie: Scottish Gaelic: Brothaigh
- Location within Moray
- Council area: Moray
- Lieutenancy area: Moray
- Country: Scotland
- Sovereign state: United Kingdom
- Police: Scotland
- Fire: Scottish
- Ambulance: Scottish

Brodie is a small village in Moray, Scotland located about 2.8 miles (4.5 kilometres) south-west of Forres. It is best known of being the location of Brodie Castle and part of the land historically owned by Clan Brodie, where the village derives it name.

The Brodie railway station served the village from 1857 to 1965.

== Bibliography ==
- Bain, George, F.S.A., Scotland (1893). History of Nairnshire. Nairn, Scotland: Nairn Telegraph Office.
