= Brodie railway station =

Disused railway station in Scotland

Brodie
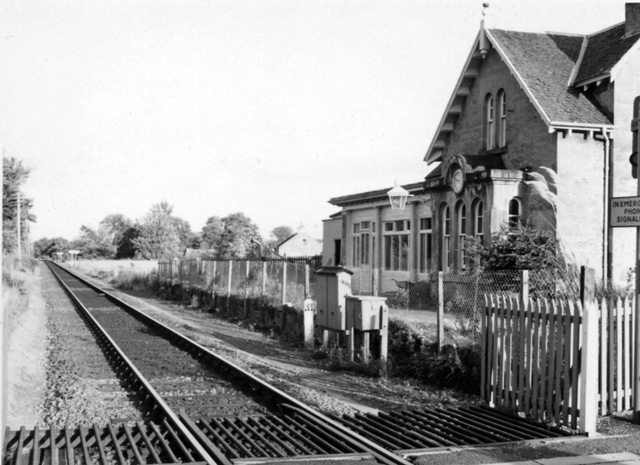
- The site of the station in 1977

General information
- Location: Brodie, Moray; Scotland
- Coordinates: 57.59331°N 3.71093°W
- Grid reference: NH978572
- Platforms: 1

Other information
- Status: Disused

History
- Original company: Inverness and Aberdeen Junction Railway
- Pre-grouping: Highland Railway
- Post-grouping: London, Midland and Scottish Railway

Key dates
- 1857: Station opened
- 3 May 1965: Station closed to passengers and goods traffic
Location

Brodie railway station served the area of Brodie, Moray, Scotland from 1857 to 1965 on the Inverness and Aberdeen Junction Railway.

== History ==
The station opened in 1857 by the Inverness and Aberdeen Junction Railway. The station closed to both passengers and goods traffic in 1965.

Preceding station	Historical railways	Following station
Auldearn; Line open, station closed	Inverness and Aberdeen Junction Railway	Forres; Line open, station closed
