= Castle Grant platform railway station =

Former railway station in Scotland

Coordinates: 57.35211°N 3.60894°W

Bridge and gatehouse

Castle Grant platform railway station was a railway station serving Castle Grant, in Strathspey in Scotland.

== History ==
This station was opened with the Inverness and Perth Junction Railway in 1863. The station closed in 1949, the line closing in 1965.

Preceding station	Historical railways	Following station
Dava; Line and Station closed	Inverness and Perth Junction Railway	Grantown-on-Spey (West); Line and Station closed

== Location ==
This was a private halt located at the overbridge and lodge at the gatehouse of Castle Grant (grid reference NJ032302). The overbridge is where the railway crosses the A939 road north of Grantown-on-Spey

'...in acknowledgement of the great facilities given by the Earl of Seafield in the formation of the railway through his estates'

== Remains ==
Some concrete platform stumps remain along the trackbed (in various states) near the lodge.

== Sources ==
- Historic Scotland - mentions Castle Grant halt.
