= Dalcross =

Coordinates: 57°31′N 4°02′W

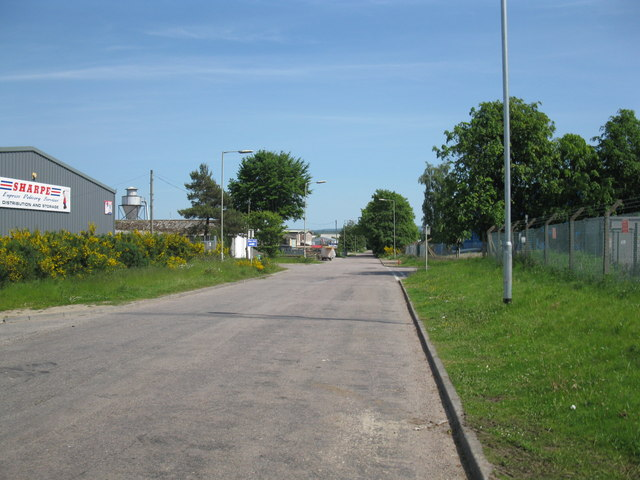

Dalcross, in the original Gaelic, Dealgan Cros, later shortened to Dealgros, is a location in the Highland region of Scotland. It is on the Moray Firth about 10 km (6 miles) east-north-east of Inverness and contains Inverness Airport, Dalcross industrial estate, Dalcross Castle and Dalcross Forest.

== Inverness Airport railway station ==
On 16 October 2015, the principal contractor for the forthcoming modernisation of the Inverness-Aberdeen line was announced. Included in the project is infrastructure that will allow a new station to be built at Dalcross. The original station closed in 1965. This work is due for completion by 2019 and involves double tracking between Aberdeen and Inverurie and similar work to Dalcross at Kintore. Dalcross railway station, which closed in 1965, was due to be re-opened between 2014 and 2019. However, it was renamed to Inverness Airport station, and was opened in February 2023.
