= Elgin railway station =

Railway station in Moray, Scotland

Elgin Scottish Gaelic: Eilginn
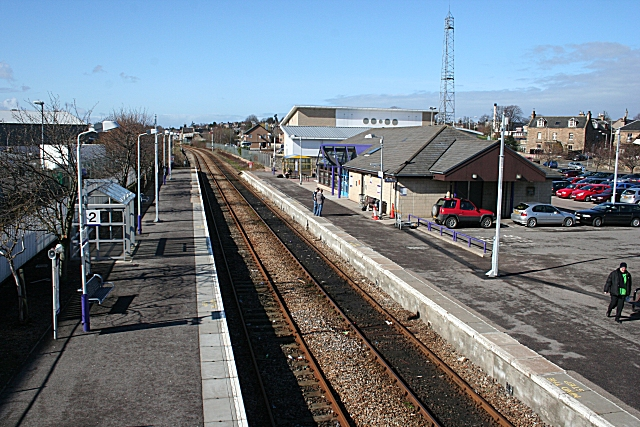
- Elgin railway station, looking towards Inverness (2007)

General information
- Location: Elgin, Moray; Scotland
- Coordinates: 57.6428°N 3.3110°W
- Grid reference: NJ218621
- Manager: ScotRail
- Platforms: 2

Other information
- Station code: ELG

Key dates
- 10 August 1852: GNSR station opened
- 25 March 1858: Highland station opened
- 6 May 1968: GNSR station closed
- 1990: Highland station rebuilt

Passengers
- 2020/21: ▼64,492
- 2021/22: ▲0.197 million
- 2022/23: ▲0.229 million
- 2023/24: ▲0.284 million
- 2024/25: ▲0.295 million
Location
Notes
- Passenger statistics from the Office of Rail and Road

Elgin railway station is a railway station serving the town of Elgin, Moray in Scotland. The station is managed and served by ScotRail and is on the Aberdeen to Inverness Line, between Keith and Forres, measured 12 miles 18 chains (19.7 km) from Forres.

== History ==
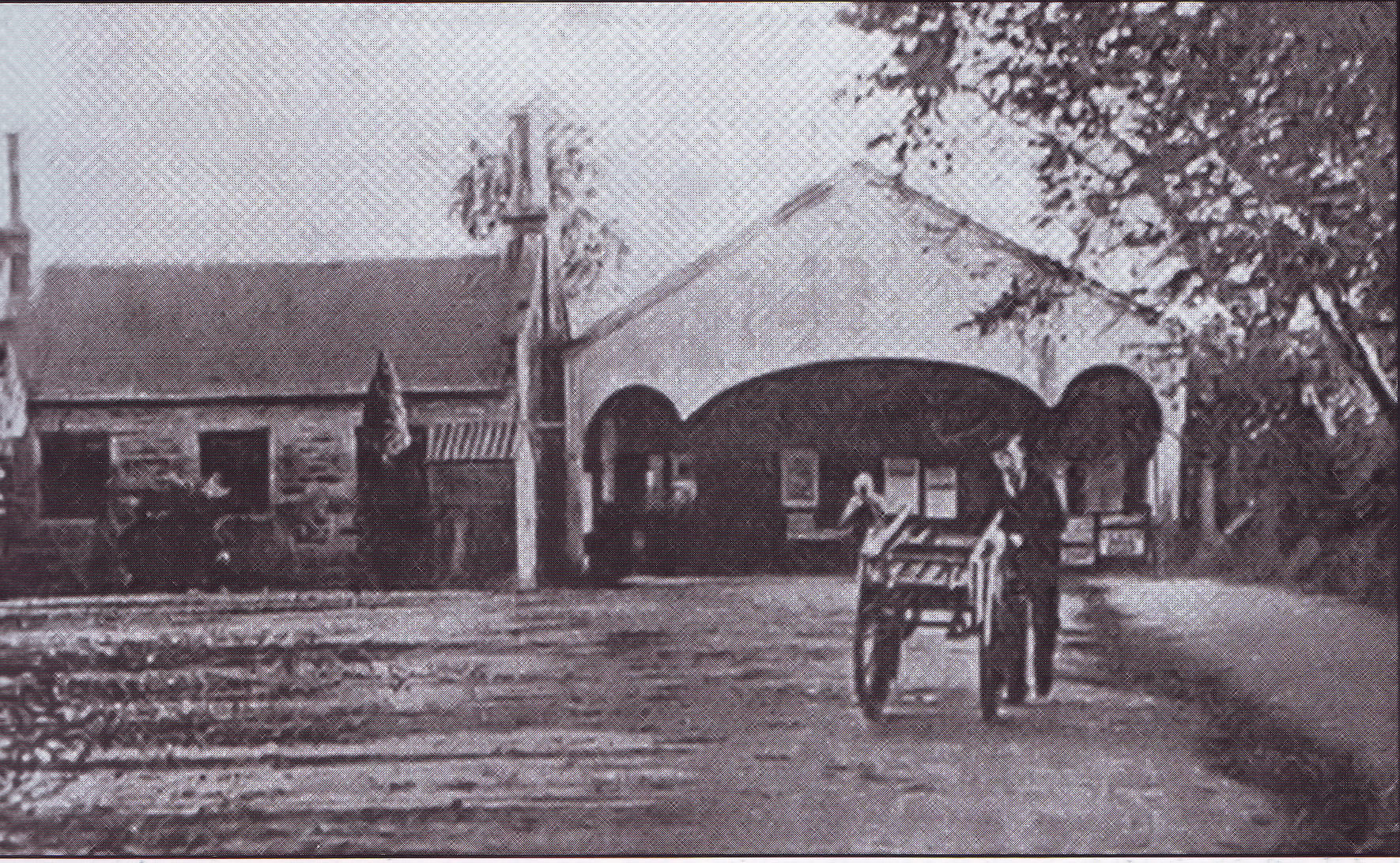
The first station built by the Morayshire Railway in 1852

The first station in Elgin was opened by the Great North of Scotland Railway (GNSR) on 10 August 1852 by the Morayshire Railway. The second owned by the Highland Railway was opened on 25 March 1858 by the Inverness and Aberdeen Junction Railway and later known as Elgin West.

The GNSR company prepared plans in the mid-1890s for a new station building which was intended to be a joint station with the Highland Railway. Patrick Moir Barnett, engineer-in-chief of the GNSR submitted a plan which proposed a diversion from the Highland company mainline and a new double line, with platforms on all, which would have resulted in the Highland company's existing lines becoming joint. GNSR trains from Craigellachie and Lossiemouth could run into different lines, and the Highland company's trains would stop opposite, allowing easy exchange between carriages.

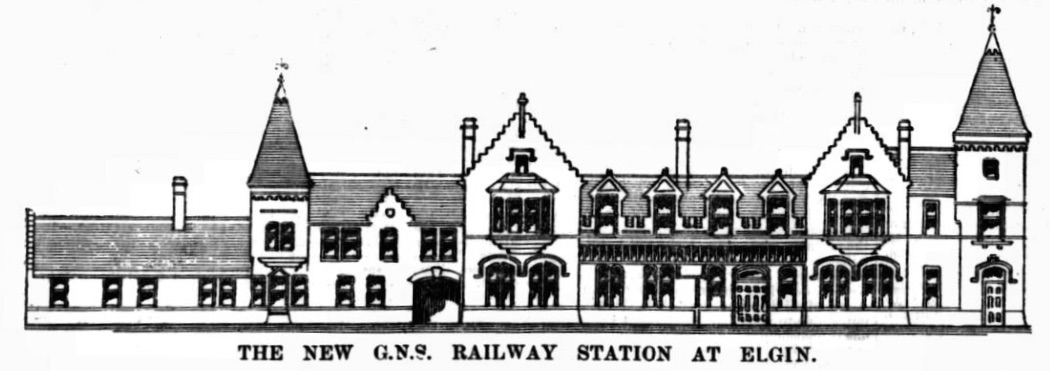
The proposed new station from the Elgin Courant, and Morayshire Advertiser 8 April 1898

The GNSR proceeded with plans of their own in 1898 on their existing site, with a new building with a front elevation of 130 ft (40 m) in length. Construction started in 1899 and the new station was modified during construction. It resulted in a frontage of 250 ft (76 m). The new building opened on Saturday 30 August 1902. The upper part of the building provided accommodation to the manager's apartments, clerks and tea-rooms, and the western portion was the station masters's house. The ground floor comprised a large waiting-room with a circular glass roof, about 70 ft (21 m) in length and 30 ft (9 m) in width. All four platforms had an iron and glass canopy with the ironwork painted in pale blue colour. The clerk's office contained a row of telegraph instruments, and telephones communicating with the locomotive department, the signal cabins and with the Highland station. A pneumatic tube system conveying messages to and from other offices was also installed.

The present station, formerly the West (ex-Highland) station, was retained in 1968-69 was rebuilt and the platforms were raised. The new passenger facilities proved inadequate and it was rebuilt again in a modern style by British Rail in 1990 at a cost of £400,000 (equivalent to £990,000 in 2025).

The GNSR station (known as Elgin East) was closed with the end of services on the coast and Craigellachie lines on 6 May 1968.

=== Recent infrastructure improvements ===
As well as the aforementioned timetable improvements, Transport Scotland agreed in 2014 to fund a £170 million infrastructure upgrade project for the line. This included signalling improvements, a longer loop and platform extensions for Elgin. Control of the signalling at the station has since transferred to a new workstation in the Inverness signalling centre, following a 10-day line closure that saw the loop at the station lengthened and a new station and loop commissioned at Forres. The signalbox itself closed in October 2017.

== Facilities ==
The station has a ticket office, ticket machine and accessible toilets on platform 1, adjacent to which is the car park and bike racks. Both platforms are equipped with waiting shelters, benches and help points, and are linked by a footbridge and lifts.

== Passenger services ==
Passenger Volume at Elgin
	2004–05	2005–06	2006–07	2007–08	2008–09	2009–10	2010–11	2011–12	2012–13	2013–14	2014–15	2015–16	2016–17	2017–18	2018–19	2019–20	2020–21	2021–22	2022–23	2023–24	2024–25
Entries and exits	225,516	245,980	240,365	246,662	261,296	272,928	297,546	306,964	322,324	334,537	342,466	343,652	317,456	299,484	306,206	304,670	64,492	196,958	228,902	284,140	295,372

The statistics cover twelve month periods that start in April.

== Services ==
As of May 2026, the basic service at the station is (roughly) two-hourly in each direction, west to Inverness and east to Aberdeen, though a number of trains also start/terminate here from the Inverness direction to give an approximately hourly service westbound. The first eastbound train each weekday continues through to Dundee and Edinburgh Waverley. On Sundays, there are five trains each way.

Preceding station	National Rail	Following station
Keith or Terminus	ScotRail; Aberdeen to Inverness Line	Forres
	Historical railways	
Lhanbryde; Line open; station closed	Inverness and Aberdeen Junction Railway	Mosstowie; Line open; station closed

== Bibliography ==
- Brailsford, Martyn, ed. (December 2017) [1987]. Railway Track Diagrams 1: Scotland & Isle of Man (6th ed.). Frome: Trackmaps. ISBN 978-0-9549866-9-8.
- Butt, R. V. J. (October 1995). The Directory of Railway Stations: details every public and private passenger station, halt, platform and stopping place, past and present (1st ed.). Sparkford: Patrick Stephens Ltd. ISBN 978-1-85260-508-7. OCLC 60251199. OL 11956311M.
