= Aberdeen–Inverness line =

Railway line in Scotland linking Aberdeen and Inverness

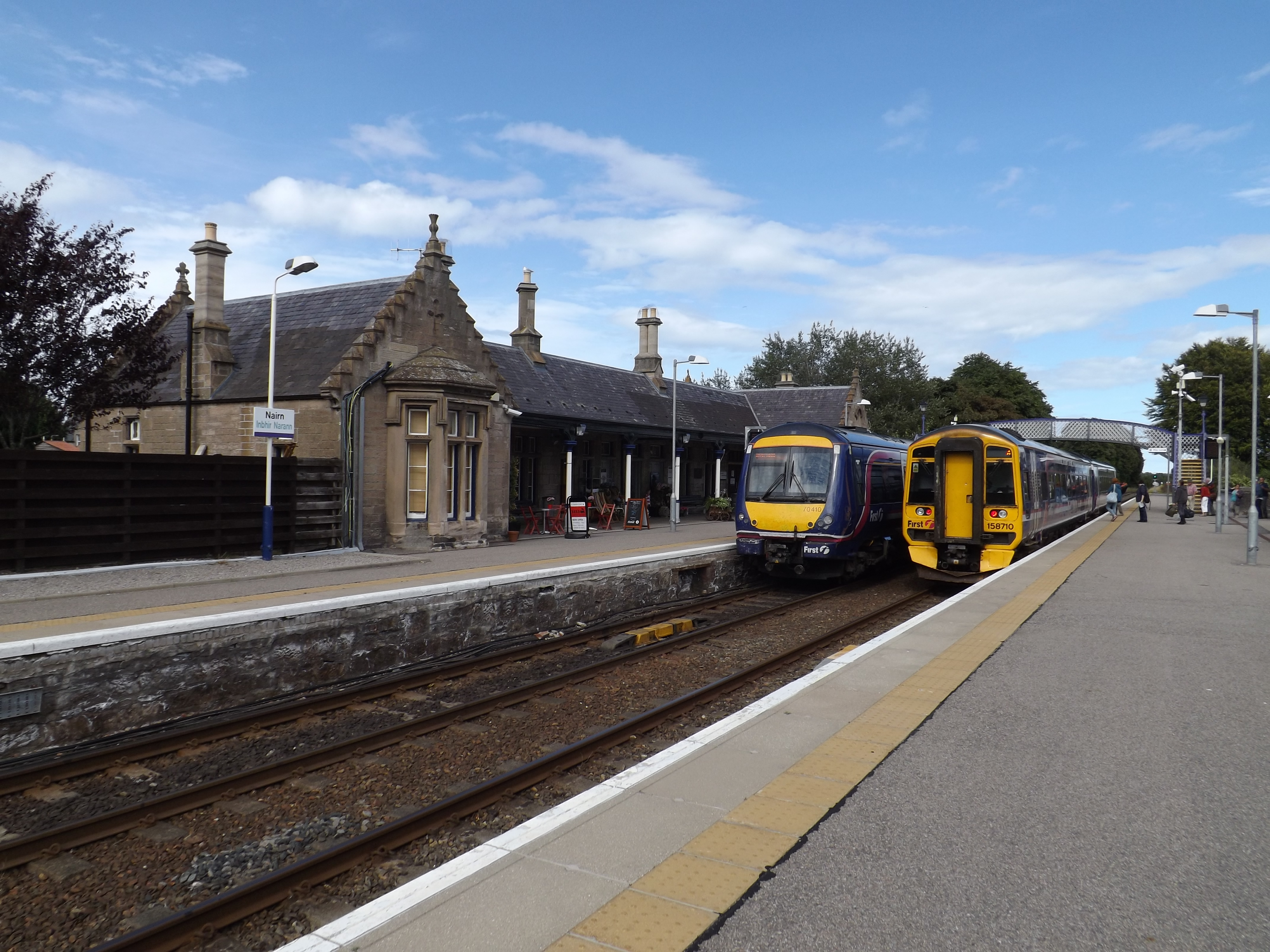
- Trains passing at Nairn station in 2013

Overview
- Status: Operational
- Owner: Network Rail
- Locale: Aberdeenshire; Highland
- Termini: Inverness; Aberdeen
- Stations: 12

Service
- System: National Rail
- Operator: ScotRail
- Rolling stock: Class 158 "Express Sprinter", Class 170 "Turbostar" and Class 43 "HST"

History
- Opened: 1854-1858

Technical
- Line length: 108 miles 21 chains (174.2 km)
- Number of tracks: Mixture of Single and double track
- Track gauge: 4 ft 8 1/2 in (1,435 mm) standard gauge
- Operating speed: 75 mph (120 km/h) maximum
Route map
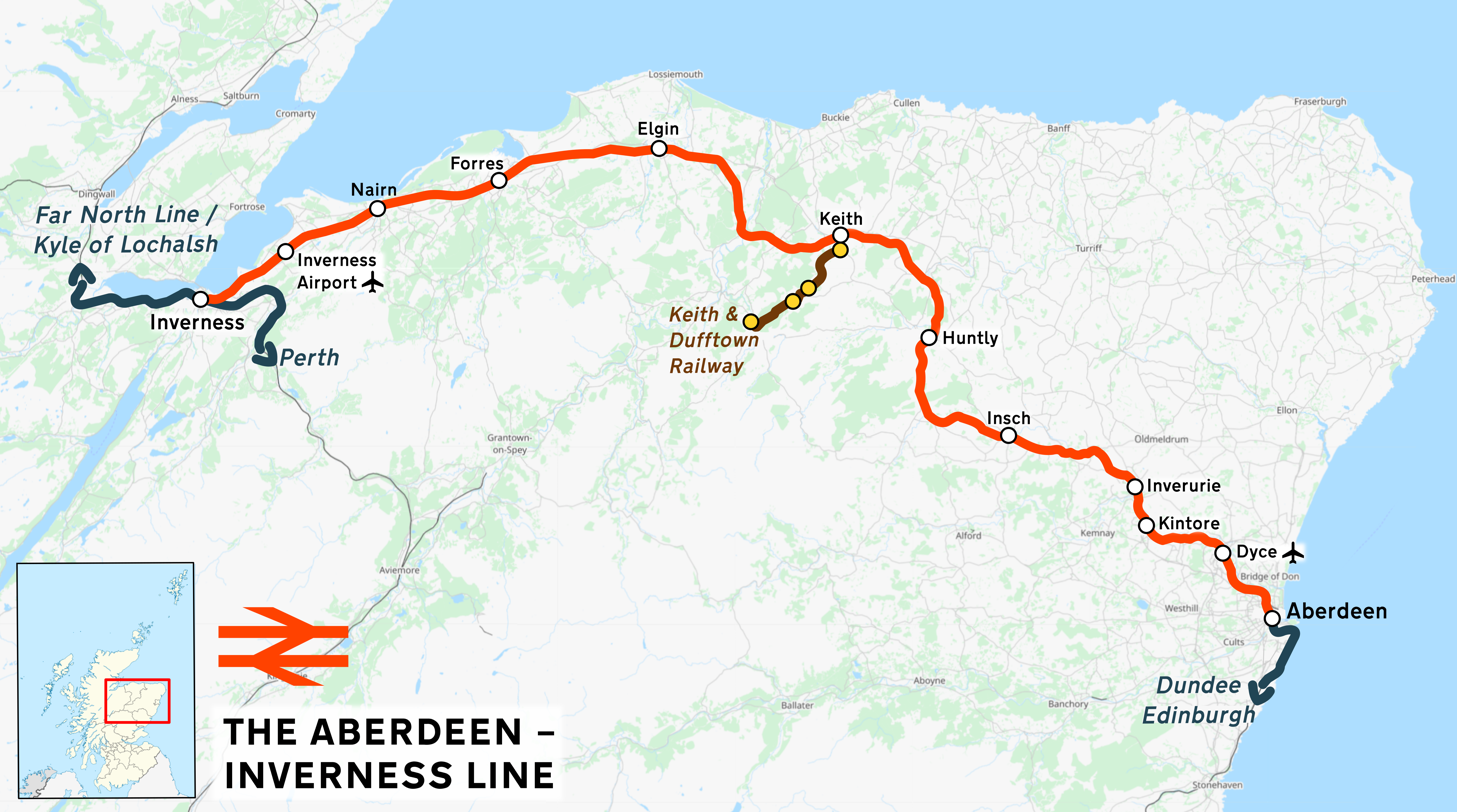
(Click to expand)

The Aberdeen–Inverness line is a railway line in Scotland linking Aberdeen and Inverness. It is not electrified. Most of the line is single-track, other than passing places and longer double-track sections between Insch and Kennethmont and Inverurie and Berryden Junction (Aberdeen).

== History ==
The line was built in three parts:

- Inverness and Nairn Railway between Inverness and Nairn, which opened on 5 November 1855.
- Inverness and Aberdeen Junction Railway between Nairn and Keith which opened in 1858.
- Great North of Scotland Railway between Keith and Aberdeen which opened on 19 September 1854, with the southern portion (between Port Elphinstone and Aberdeen Waterloo) being built over the route of the Aberdeenshire Canal.

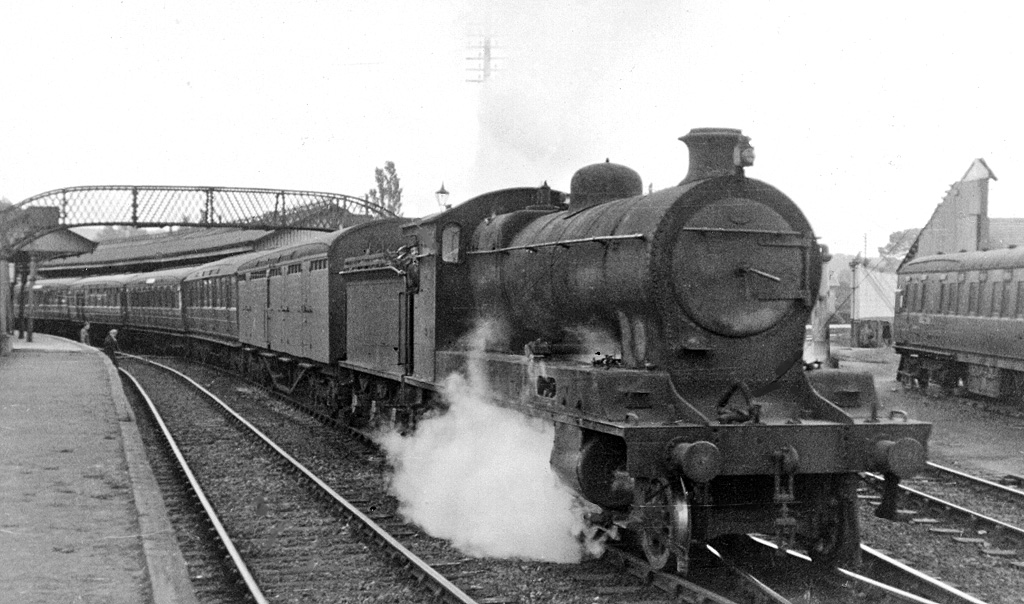
A Highland Railway 'Clan Goods' locomotive at Forres

The first two parts of the line merged to form the Highland Railway. The Highland Railway operated the line from Inverness to Keith with the Great North operating the line from there to Aberdeen. The Highland was grouped with other railways into the London Midland and Scottish Railway and the Great North was grouped into the London and North Eastern Railway by the Railways Act 1921, before eventually becoming part of British Railways in 1948.

=== Since 1948 ===
Many intermediate stations and connecting branch lines were closed to both passenger and goods traffic at various dates during the 1950s and 1960s. The 1963 Reshaping of British Railways report recommended the closure of Inverurie and Insch stations, but these remain open. In 1968, the route was singled.

Dyce railway station was reopened in 1984.

The railway bridge over the A96 road south of Nairn was replaced in 1991. A new steel-span bridge was constructed adjacent to the existing stone arched bridge. The new bridge was opened in July 1991. This eliminated a bottleneck on the A96 where lights allowed only one direction of traffic at a time under the narrow bridge.

In 2009, a new freight interchange at Dyce, known as Raith's Farm, was opened.

In 2017, the line through Forres was straightened and a new station built, reinstating the second platform and extending the passing loop there. The platforms at Elgin were extended, the passing loop extended from 650 metres (710 yd) to 1.25 km (1,370 yd), and a turnback facility was added. In addition to this, there were signalling improvements: control of the line between Inverness and Keith was transferred to the Highland signalling centre in Inverness.

In 2019, redoubling work between Aberdeen and Inverurie was completed, though a 1.5 km (1,640 yd) section north of Aberdeen railway station remains single-track. Much of this is in tunnels, which would have required track lowering to support two tracks. The same year, Dyce and Inverurie signal boxes were closed, with control between Kittybrewster to Insch also transferred to the Highland signalling centre. The platforms at Insch railway station were also extended.

Kintore railway station was reopened in October 2020. Inverness Airport railway station (close to the site of the former Dalcross railway station) opened in February 2023.

== Current services ==
All passenger services are operated by ScotRail. There is some limited freight traffic, with Elgin retaining a yard for track maintenance, whilst Keith and Huntly retain unused yards. Inverness has an intermodal freight facility Needlefield Yard, and Dyce retains Raith's Farm. A daily intermodal service runs between Inverness and Glasgow, but Raith's Farm is relatively unused due to intermodal traffic terminating at Craiginches Yard south of Aberdeen.

In addition to through services, local services operate at each end of the line. An hourly service operates between Elgin and Inverness, while a half-hourly service operates between Inverurie and Aberdeen. Approximately one train per hour continues to Montrose, creating an hourly stopping service between Inverurie and Montrose.

The line serves the following stations:

| Station | Grid reference | Notes |
|---|---|---|
| Aberdeen | NJ941058 | Connection with the Edinburgh to Aberdeen Line, Glasgow to Aberdeen Line, Caledonian Sleeper to London Euston and NorthLink Ferries to Orkney and Shetland. |
| Dyce | NJ884128 | Bus connection to Aberdeen Airport. |
| Kintore | NJ789170 | Opened 15 October 2020 |
| Inverurie | NJ775218 | |
| Insch | NJ629275 | |
| Huntly | NJ535396 | |
| Keith | NJ429516 | Connection with the preserved Keith and Dufftown Railway |
| Elgin | NJ218621 | |
| Forres | NJ029589 | |
| Nairn | NH881560 | |
| Inverness Airport | NH770511 | Opened 3 February 2023 |
| Inverness | NH667454 | Connections with the Highland Main Line, the Far North Line and, via Dingwall on the Far North Line, the Kyle of Lochalsh Line. Connection with the Caledonian Sleeper to London Euston. |

== Future ==
There are currently plans to extend some of the services and increase the frequency of trains between Inverurie and Aberdeen. This will be part of the Aberdeen Crossrail project. Transport Scotland is also funding an infrastructure improvement project on the route between 2015 and 2030.

Once this work is completed, the line will support an hourly service with a two-hour journey time stopping at all stations between Aberdeen and Inverness.

In the Scottish Government's National Transport Strategy, published in February 2020, it was stated that the line between Aberdeen and Inverurie would be electrified with overhead lines by 2035. The remainder of the route will also be electrified but at a later date.

== Reference outside Scotland ==
There is a residence hall at the University of California, Riverside that is named after the Aberdeen-Inverness rail line. The Aberdeen-Inverness Residence Hall was the first residence hall at the university and is still in operation today. Originally, Aberdeen, A and B wings, was all male. Inverness, D and E wings, was all female. By the early 1970s, the twin residences became fully coeducational.
