= Dava railway station =

Former railway station in Scotland

Dava
- The site of the station in 2014

General information
- Location: Scotland
- Coordinates: 57.4299°N 3.6534°W
- Elevation: 985 feet (300 m)
- Platforms: 2
- Tracks: 2

Other information
- Status: Closed

History
- Closed: 18 October 1865
- Original company: Inverness and Perth Junction Railway
- Pre-grouping: Highland Railway
- Post-grouping: London, Midland and Scottish Railway
Location

Dava railway station was opened in 1864, on the Inverness and Perth Junction Railway, one year after the route was opened.

== Station layout ==
The station layout was double platform (including passing loop). There was a standard Highland Railway overbridge connecting the platforms, at the north end of the platforms. The Railway Clearing House detailed that in 1904, the station could handle cattle, horseboxes, passengers and general goods, but it was not furnished with a steam crane to offload goods.

== Station location ==
At 985 feet above sea-level, Dava was the third highest station on the Highland Railway network. The summit that followed south of the station (Dava Summit) reaches 1,052 feet.

The station was located in sparsely populated moorland, along a dirt track near the junction of the A939 and A940 (OS Grid Reference NJ008389). The purpose of a station at this location was to provide a passing loop with water columns (15 miles from Forres and 16 miles to the first junction at Boat of Garten), although the station did provide some facilities for the area, such as a post office.

The surrounding area is wild moorland (The Dava muir).

== Closure ==
Goods services at Dava were first to end; the date of closure was 27 January 1964. A passenger service continued until 18 October 1965, when the station closed completely.

== Remains ==
The station building, stationmaster's house, and platforms still remain. The stationmaster's house is a private residence. The standard overbridge no longer exists.

== Bus substitution ==
No replacement bus services exist to Dava. This remote area has not been served by public transport since the railway closed.

Preceding station	Historical railways	Following station
Dunphail; Line and Station closed	Inverness and Perth Junction Railway	Castle Grant platform Line and Station closed
