= Inverness and Nairn Railway =

Scottish railway line

Overview
- Locale: Scotland
- Dates of operation: November 5, 1855–May 17, 1861
- Successor: Inverness and Aberdeen Junction Railway

Technical
- Track gauge: 1,435 mm (4 ft 8 1/2 in) standard gauge

The Inverness and Nairn Railway was a railway company that operated between the burghs in the company name. It opened its line in 1855 and its passenger business was instantly successful. At first it was not connected to any other line. However it was seen as a first step towards connecting Inverness and Central Scotland, via Aberdeen and when feasible, directly southwards.

The Inverness and Aberdeen Junction Railway was building a line connecting Nairn with the Great North of Scotland Railway at Keith, completing a route to Aberdeen and Central Scotland. The I&AJR took over the working of the Nairn company in 1857, and absorbed it in 1861.

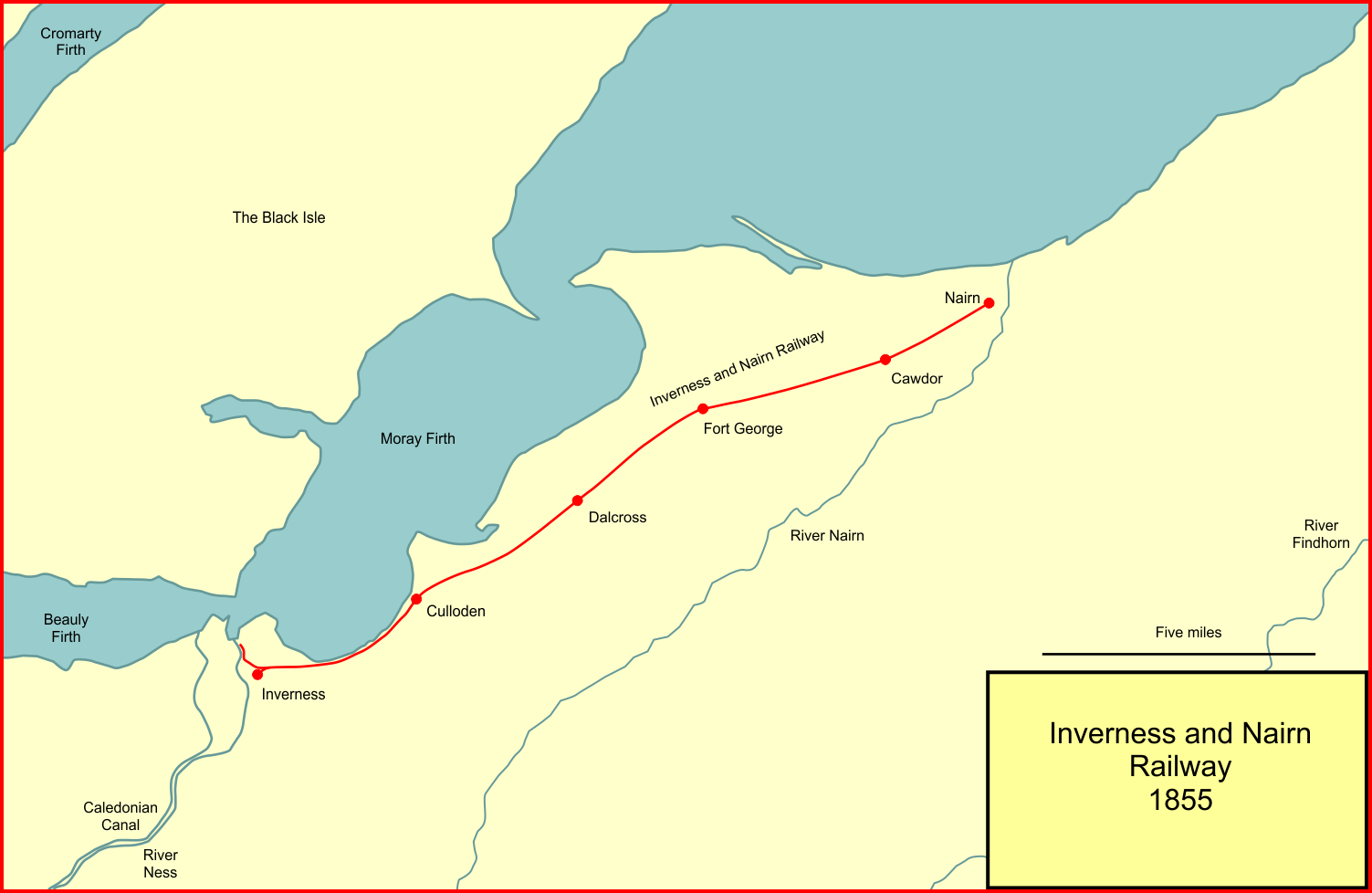
The Inverness and Nairn Railway system

The Nairn route was therefore on the main route from Inverness to Aberdeen, and from 1863 part of a new direct line to the south from Forres, the Inverness and Perth Junction Railway over a summit at Dava. On the opening of the Inverness and Aviemore Direct Railway route in 1898 most southward trains were diverted away, to that route. Nowadays the Nairn line is part of the Inverness to Aberdeen route.

== Aberdeen first ==
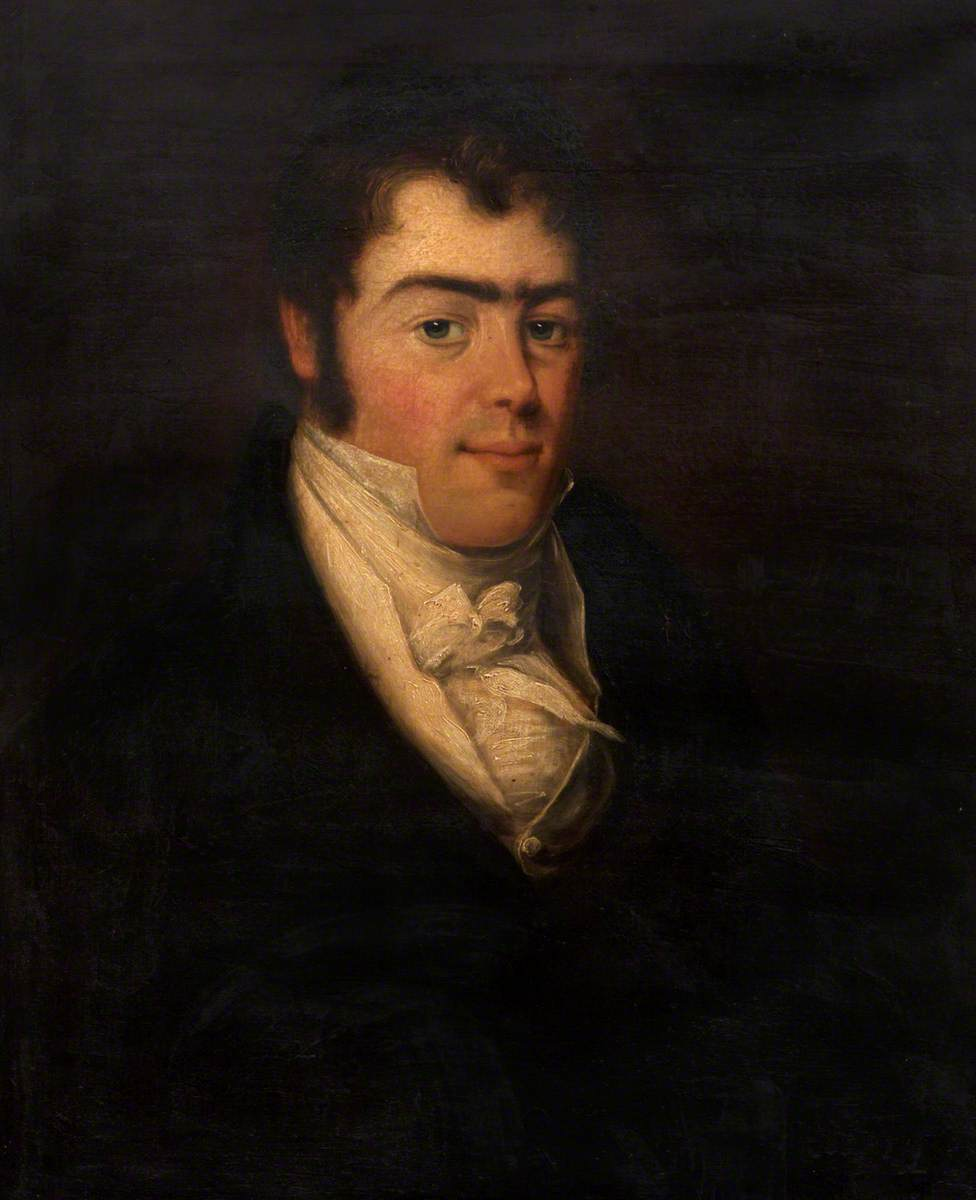
The engineer Joseph Mitchell, the driving force for railways at Inverness

As railways proliferated in the 1840s, the benefits to those places connected by them became plain. Local produce and manufactures could be got to market cheaply, and essential commodities could be brought in, also cheaply. Communities not connected to a railway suffered.

Aberdeen got its railway, connecting it to Central Scotland, in 1850, and interests in Inverness looked for the possibility of a railway for their burgh. Whereas Aberdeen could connect southwards down a fertile and well-populated coastal strip, Inverness was isolated to the north of the Monadhliath Mountains. At the time it was scarcely conceivable that a railway could be carried over that formidable obstacle. In 1846 Parliament had thrown out a proposed railway directly connecting Inverness and Perth, as being impracticable.

Interests in Aberdeen proposed a line from there to Inverness, and in 1846 the Great North of Scotland Railway (GNoSR) was given its authorising Act of Parliament, but for a line from Aberdeen to Huntly only; the intention was to get authorisation for the remainder of the route later. Indeed it is likely that some interests in the GNoSR camp saw dominance of the whole of northern Scotland, via Aberdeen, as the end game, as implied by the company’s name. However investors were reluctant to put money into the scheme, and of the £1.1 million of authorised capital, only £400,000 had been subscribed by 1852. Despite the deficient capital, the GNoSR line was tentatively opened for traffic in 1854. Having taken stock, the Great North of Scotland Railway announced that they had decided to extend as far as Keith, but no further.

== Inverness and Nairn ==
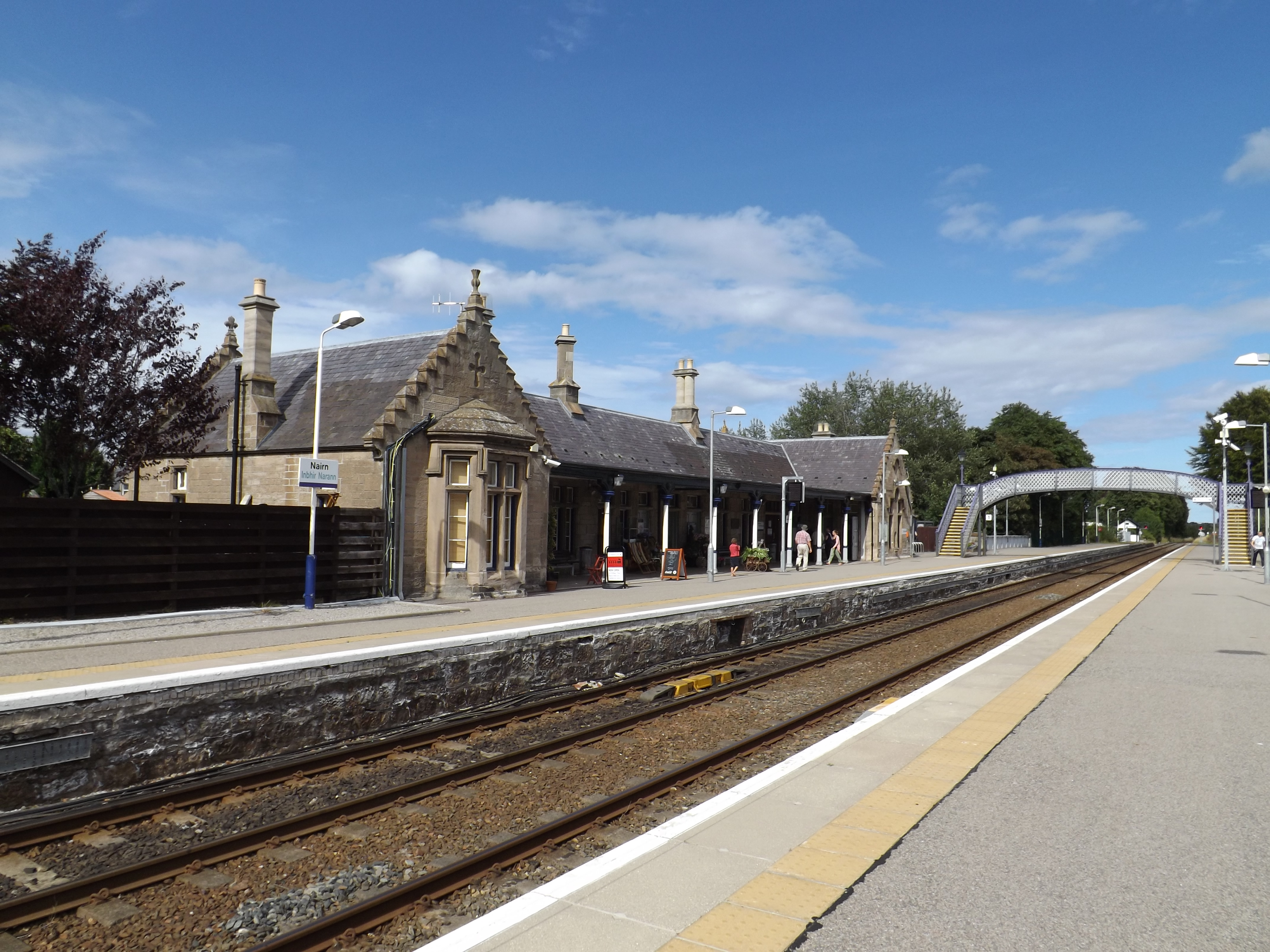
Nairn station in 2013

At the Inverness end of the line this seemed a very unsatisfactory position, and the engineer Joseph Mitchell (engineer) was energetic in 1853 in proposing railway connections from Inverness. With the GNoSR unwilling to build to Inverness as they had earlier promised, the time was right for Inverness interests to act. To avoid the huge expense of a lengthy and expensive line at the outset, he contented himself with promoting a line as far as Nairn, a distance of 15 miles. This he saw as the first step in a line turning south to Perth. Indeed the parliamentary bill was entitled, "The Inverness – Perth Railway section from Inverness to Nairn (or northern section)".

In Parliament the GNoSR lodged objections to the I&NR Bill, and it was urgently necessary to make peace with the Aberdeen company, which would be a formidable, and expensive, adversary. A draft agreement was drawn up, giving the GNoSR running powers over the I&NR line, from such time as the companies' lines met, and allowing for the GNoSR to have facilities for a booking clerk in the station at Inverness. On this basis, the Great North withdrew its opposition. The document, drawn up on 25 February 1854, was approved by the I&NR directors.

Inverness and Nairn Railway Act 1854
- Act of Parliament
- Parliament of the United Kingdom
- Long title: An Act for making a Railway from the Town of Inverness to the Town of Nairn.
- Citation: 17 & 18 Vict. c. clxxvi

Dates
- Royal assent: 24 July 1854

Other legislation
- Repealed by: Inverness and Nairn Railway Act 1857

Status: Repealed

Text of statute as originally enacted

Inverness and Nairn Railway Act 1857
- Act of Parliament
- Parliament of the United Kingdom
- Long title: An Act to amend "The Inverness and Nairn Railway Act, 1854;" to enable the Inverness and Nairn Railway Company to create a Preference Stock, and to raise further Sums of Money; and for other Purposes.
- Citation: 20 & 21 Vict. c. v

Dates
- Royal assent: 26 June 1857

Other legislation
- Repealed by: Highland Railway Act 1865

Status: Repealed

Text of statute as originally enacted

The bill got royal assent on 24 July 1854 and became an act of Parliament, the Inverness and Nairn Railway Act 1854 (17 & 18 Vict. c. clxxvi).

On 24 January 1855, a tender from Hawthorns of Leith for two engines, at £2,375 each, was accepted, and rolling stock to the value of £4,436 was also on order: three first-class, four third-class, carriages, and a van from Brown & Marshall; two carriage trucks and two cattle and sheep trucks from Faulds of Glasgow; and two horse-boxes, six timber trucks, and twenty open wagons from Watsons of Errol.

So relatively short and level a line was no problem for Messrs Brassey and Falshaw, The line ran through easy terrain along the fertile coastal strip, and was soon ready. However it was not connected to any other line, and all the rolling stock and heavy construction components had to be brought in by coastal shipping, mostly from Leith. The selection of cargoes was rather chaotic and it considerably delayed the opening of the line.

It was inspected by Lt Col Wynne for the Board of Trade on 3 October, but there were shortcomings in signals, turntables and rolling stock, and opening for passengers was refused. The line was reinspected on 27 October and the line opened for general traffic on 7 November 1855. There was a ceremonial opening on 5 November, and on that day and the following day certain special excursion tickets were sold. Large numbers travelled on those days.

There were stations serving Inverness, Culloden, Dalcross, Fort George, Cawdor (not open at first, but only after a delay) and Nairn. The Inverness station had a single platform 20 yards long. At Inverness there was a westward extension passing the station and running to a riverside location adjacent to Shore Street, reached at first by a wagon turntable. It was horse-operated. (Note: The alignment as far as the bank of the River Ness was later used for the extension towards Clachnaharry.) The train service consisted of four trains each way daily, reduced to three daily from 1 December; the journey time was 45 minutes. A goods service was started on 1 December 1855, including on the Harbour branch, but it was poorly patronised. Nevertheless the passenger service was very buoyant, and it was decided to order additional carriages to handle the anticipated extra traffic in the summer.

The line had cost £56,540 to build and equip.

The new railway stimulated an important traffic in pleasure visits to the seaside at Nairn; even in the first January of operation, about 300 farm workers were treated to a seaside trip by their employers.

== Through to Aberdeen ==
The Great North of Scotland Railway had been intended to complete the connection between Aberdeen and Nairn, but it had exhausted available capital and only reached Huntly at first, in 1854. Taking stock at that stage, it then decided to continue to Keith, opening in 1856.

Interests in Inverness had always seen the Nairn line as simply a first step, and during its construction phase plans were developed to extend towards Aberdeen. The Inverness and Aberdeen Junction Railway was authorised in 1856, opening from Nairn to Dalvey (Forres) on 22 December 1857 and taking over the working of the Inverness and Nairn Railway. The Aberdeen company opened through to Keith on 18 August 1858. The Nairn company's line was effectively part of the through route between Inverness and Aberdeen.

On 17 May 1861, the Inverness and Aberdeen Junction Railway amalgamated with the Inverness and Nairn Railway.

== Inverness and Perth Junction Railway ==
Passengers and goods between Inverness and the south were still subject to the great deviation through Aberdeen, and a more direct route southward was needed. This was eventually provided when the Inverness and Perth Junction Railway opened for traffic, on 9 September 1863. This started from Forres, cutting south over a summit at Dava, through wild and sparsely populated terrain before reaching Aviemore, and then onwards via Blair Atholl, Pitlochry and Dunkeld. For the time being therefore, the original Inverness and Nairn Railway section was part of the main line from Inverness to the south.

== Highland Railway ==
On 1 February 1865, the Inverness and Aberdeen Junction Railway and the Inverness and Perth Junction Railway companies merged; the merger was authorised on 29 June 1865, and from that date the company was named the Highland Railway.

The route to the south from Inverness was of prime importance to the company, but the long route round through Forres was increasingly disadvantageous. In 1898 the Highland Railway opened a new direct line from Inverness to Aviemore via Carrbridge, shortening the route by 26 miles.

The earlier Dava route continued in operation, and some Inverness trains continued to use it. It was closed in 1965, and the Inverness and Nairn stretch was now simply a short part of the route between Inverness and Aberdeen. (Note: Except for the very short section on the immediate approach to Inverness station.)

== Subsequent history ==
The line was an intrinsic part of the Highland Railway. That company was a constituent of the new London Midland and Scottish Railway (LMS) from 1923 on the "Grouping" of the railways of Great Britain pursuant to the Railways Act 1921. Further organisational change took the LMS into national ownership in 1948 as part of British Railways.

The line continues in operation as part of the Inverness to Aberdeen line.

== Locomotives and stock ==
On the opening of the line, the company had two small 2-2-2 locomotives known as the Raigmore class. These were known as Raigmore and Aldourie. These were found to be not compatible with the line's needs and were rebuilt as 2-4-0s. They lasted until 1901, when the Highland Railway scrapped them.

The dimensions of these locomotives in their original 2-2-2 form were:

cylinders:	15 in × 20 in (38 cm × 51 cm)
grate area:	12.25 sq ft (1.14 m^{2})
wheel diameters:
leading:	3 ft 6 in (107 cm)
driving:	6 ft 0 in (183 cm)
trailing:	3 ft 6 in (107 cm)
tender:	3 ft 6 in (107 cm)
wheelbase:
engine:	6 ft 10 in (208 cm) + 7 ft 4 in (224 cm)
tender	8 ft 0 in (244 cm)
water capacity:	1,100 imperial gallons (5,000 L)
coal capacity	2.5 long tons (2.5 t)

There is not much known about the Inverness and Nairn Railway stock, but it is clear that the coaches were four wheeled and from Marshall and Brown in Birmingham. These would have been similar to early GNSR types. It is also known that the company had a number of wagons and a brake van, all four wheel.

On the formation of the Inverness and Aberdeen Junction Railway, all of the stock passed into their hands.

== Locations ==
- Inverness Harbour (goods siding); referred to for passenger use in Bradshaw's Guide between October 1863 and June 1867; (NB after absorption by the Inverness and Aberdeen Junction Railway and the opening of the Inverness and Ross-shire Railway);
- Inverness; opened 7 November 1855; still open;
- Culloden; opened 7 November 1855; renamed Allanfearn 1 November 1898; closed 3 May 1965;
- Dalcross; opened 7 November 1855; closed 3 May 1965;
- Fort George; opened 7 November 1855; renamed Gollanfield Junction 1 July 1899; renamed Gollanfield 1959; closed 3 May 1965;
- Cawdor; opened 1 December 1855; renamed Kildrummie 1 January 1857; closed 1 January 1858; continued as private Platform for Earl of Cawdor; disused about 1880;
- Nairn; opened 7 November 1855; still open.

== Gallery ==
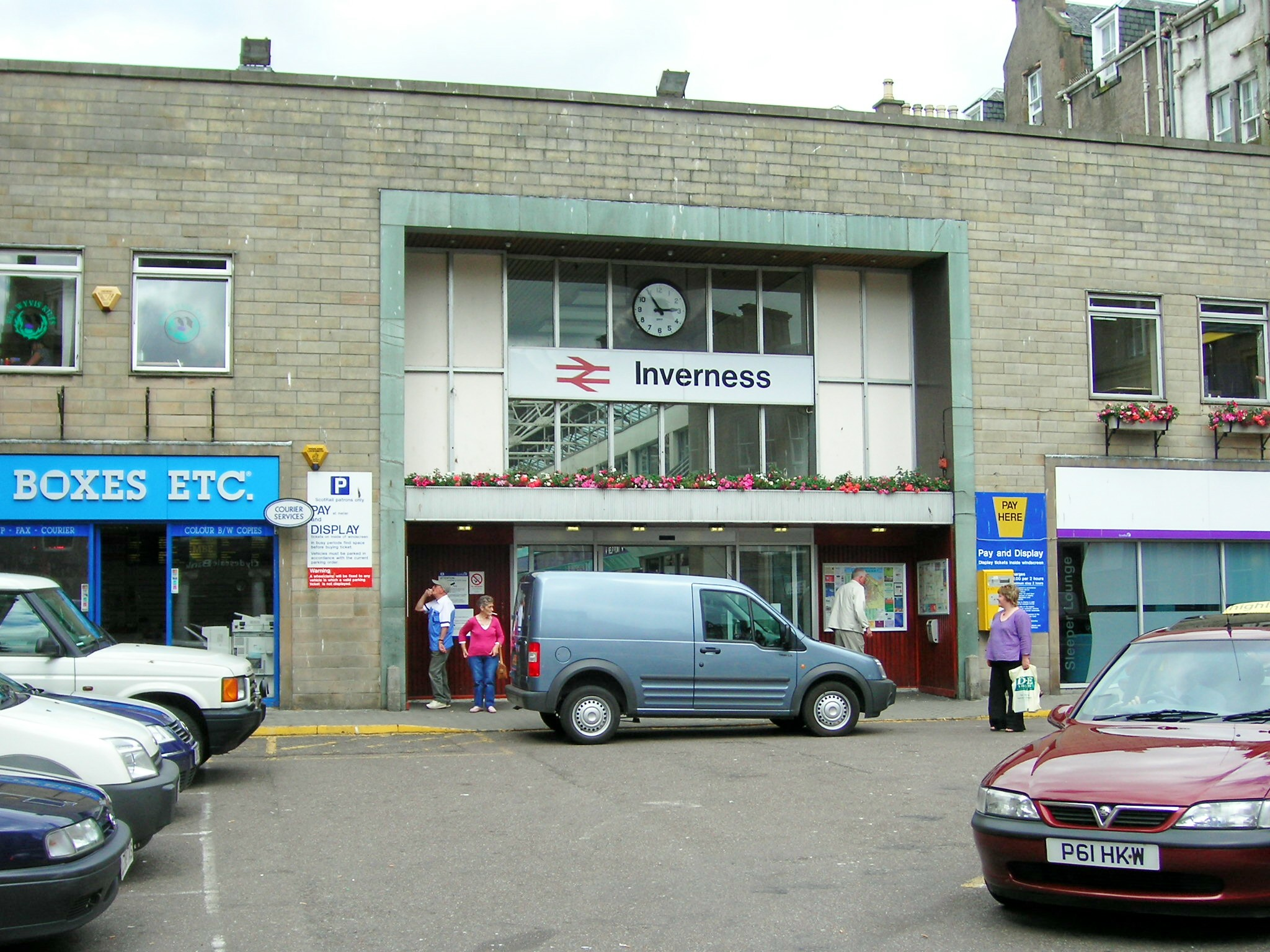
Inverness station today

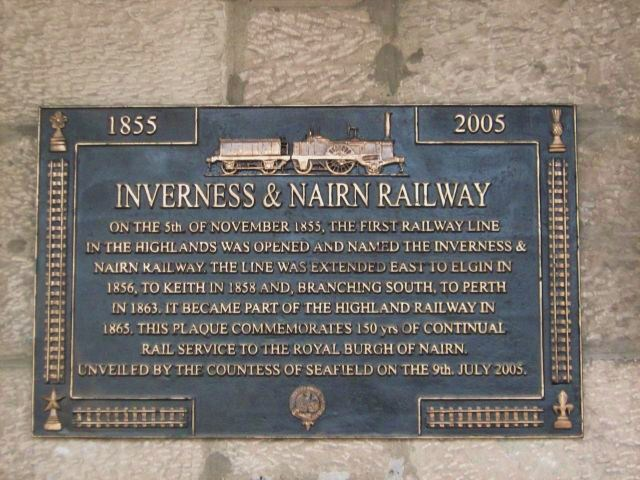
Memorial plaque, Nairn station
