= Mulben railway station =

Disused railway station in Mulben, Moray

Mulben
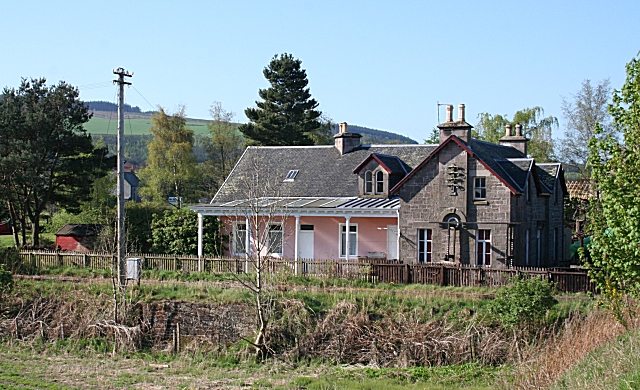
- The site of the station in 2007

General information
- Location: Mulben, Moray; Scotland
- Coordinates: 57.5431°N 3.0772°W
- Grid reference: NJ356508
- Platforms: 2

Other information
- Status: Disused

History
- Original company: Inverness and Aberdeen Junction Railway
- Pre-grouping: Highland Railway
- Post-grouping: London, Midland and Scottish Railway

Key dates
- 18 August 1858: Opened
- 7 December 1964: Closed
Location

Mulben railway station served the hamlet of Mulben, Moray, Scotland from 1858 to 1964 on the Inverness and Aberdeen Junction Railway.

== History ==
The station opened on 18 August 1858 by the Inverness and Aberdeen Junction Railway. There were two signal boxes, one at the west end and one at the east end. To the south was the goods yard. The station closed to both passengers and goods traffic on 7 December 1964.

Preceding station	Historical railways	Following station
Orton; Line open, station closed	Highland Railway; Inverness and Aberdeen Junction Railway	Tauchers Platform; Line open, station closed
