= Tauchers Platform railway station =

Railway station in Moray, Scotland

Tauchers Platform
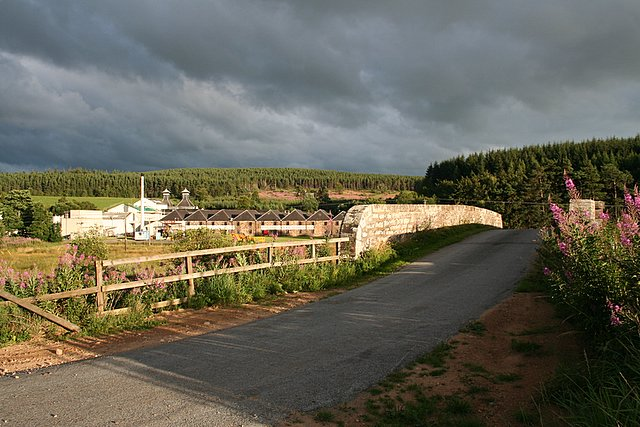
- Railway overbridge near the site of the station

General information
- Location: Mulben, Moray; Scotland
- Coordinates: 57.5364°N 3.0507°W
- Grid reference: NJ371500
- Platforms: 1

Other information
- Status: Disused

History
- Post-grouping: London, Midland and Scottish Railway

Key dates
- 1923: Station opened for distillery workers
- 23 April 1949: Station open to the general public
- 7 December 1964: Station closed to passengers
Location

Tauchers Platform railway station served Glentauchers distillery, Mulben, Moray, Scotland that had originally opened in 1897 and the hamlet of Tauchers. The single platform halt was opened by the London, Midland and Scottish Railway circa 1923 on the Inverness and Aberdeen Junction Railway route for the convenience of workers at the site and for the general public from 1949. The station lay 3 miles 70 chains (6.2 km) from Keith railway station.

== History ==
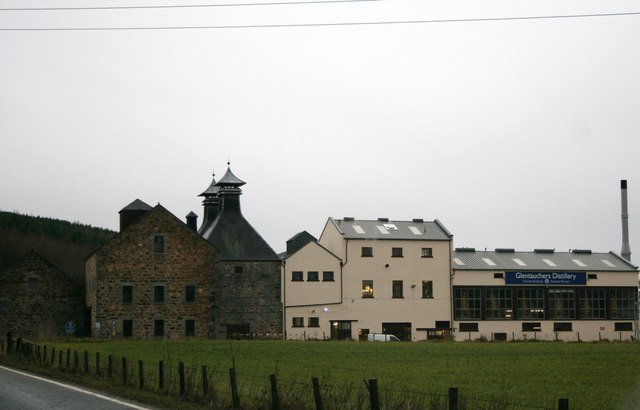
The Glentauchers Distillery.

The station is generally said to have been opened at some point after 1923 and closed to passengers traffic on 7 December 1964, however the distillery remained open and is still operational (datum 2018). The distillery was once connected by a single line that was served by freight trains from the west. From 23 May 1949 the halt was available to the general public. One source gives the opening date as 1922 in the final days of the Highland Railway. A 'Tauchers Halt' is shown on the 1938 Ordnance Survey map.

== Infrastructure ==
The simple wooden platform had basic lighting, a simple shelter and steps that ran down from the overbridge on the northern side of the line. Tauchers may have been constructed as early as 1922, immediately before the Highland Railway became part of the London Midland and Scottish Railway. It served the distillery workers and the local community, etc. until 7 December 1964, freight facilities were not provided.

Nothing now remains of the station, signal box or siding however the entrance and car park area is still present and the line remains open. The distillery branch was operated by a signal box located near the road overbridge on its western side with two short sidings and associated points lying parallel to the main line. The single track branch to the distillery had sidings that supplied the loading dock area.

== Distillery operations ==
The siding at Glentauchers Distillery was circa 4 miles west of Keith on the line between Aberdeen and Inverness. The working timetable in the mid-1950s shows that a single daily working ran between Keith and Mulben, leaving at 2:20 pm, working the Glentauchers distillery siding until 2:50 pm and then running to Mulben railway station, arriving at 2:55 pm and returning to Keith for 3:25 pm.

| Preceding station | Historical railways | Following station |
|---|---|---|
| Keith; Line open, station open | Highland Railway; Inverness and Aberdeen Junction Railway | Mulben; Line open, station closed |
