= Mosstowie railway station =

Disused railway station in Miltonduff, Moray

Mosstowie
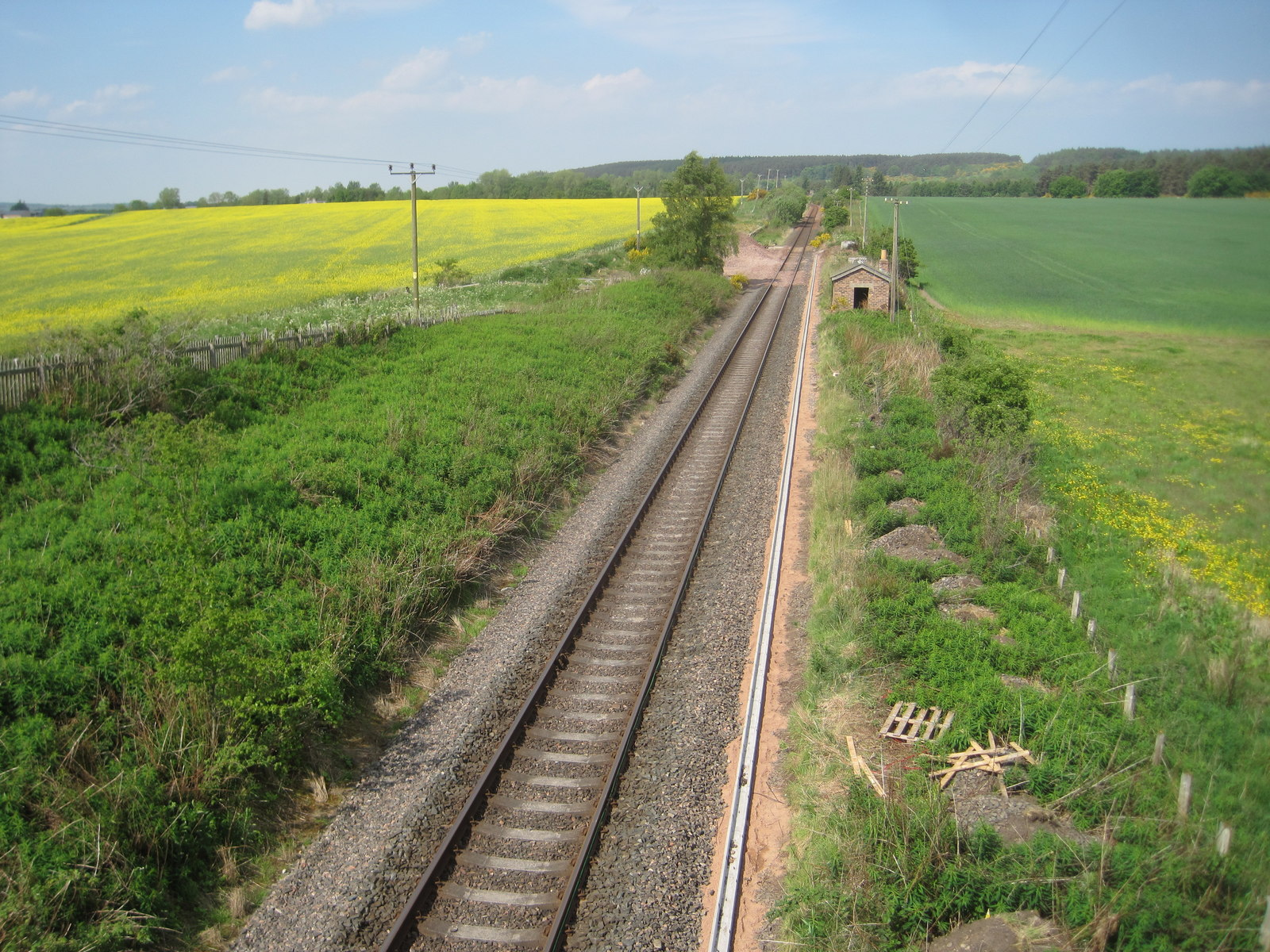
- The site of the station, looking west towards Alves, in 2017

General information
- Location: Miltonduff, Moray; Scotland
- Coordinates: 57.6419°N 3.3935°W
- Grid reference: NJ169621
- Platforms: 1

Other information
- Status: Disused

History
- Original company: Inverness and Aberdeen Junction Railway
- Pre-grouping: Highland Railway
- Post-grouping: London, Midland and Scottish Railway

Key dates
- 25 March 1858: Opened
- 7 March 1955: Closed
Location

Mosstowie railway station served the hamlet of Miltonduff, Moray, Scotland from 1858 to 1955 on the Inverness and Aberdeen Junction Railway.

== History ==
The station opened on 25 March 1858 by the Inverness and Aberdeen Junction Railway. It closed to both passengers and goods traffic on 7 March 1955.

Preceding station	Historical railways	Following station
Alves; Line open, station closed	Inverness and Aberdeen Junction Railway	Elgin
