= Burghead railway station =

Disused railway station in Scotland

Burghead
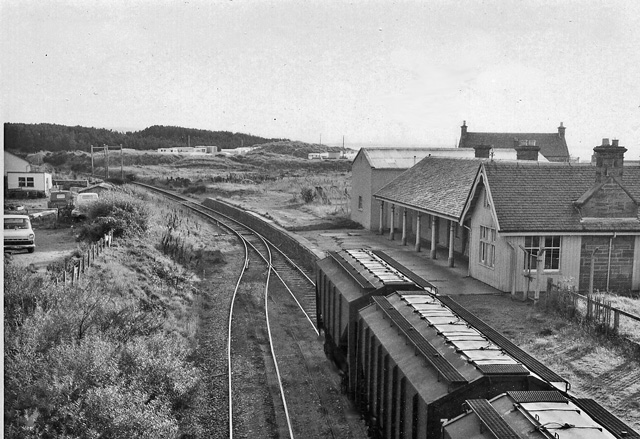
- Burghead railway station in 1974

General information
- Location: Burghead, Moray; Scotland
- Coordinates: 57.7008°N 3.4924°W, NJ111688 (1st station); 57.6999°N 3.4862°W, NJ115687 (2nd station)
- Platforms: 1

Other information
- Status: Disused

History
- Original company: Inverness and Aberdeen Junction Railway
- Pre-grouping: Highland Railway
- Post-grouping: London, Midland and Scottish Railway

Key dates
- 22 December 1862: Station opened
- 10 October 1892: Passenger station relocated
- 14 September 1931: Passenger services withdrawn
- 7 November 1966: Freight services withdrawn Station closed
- 1992: line closed completely
Location

Burghead was a railway station serving Burghead in the Scottish district of Moray (formerly Elginshire). Initially the station was the terminus of the branch line from Alves but later a through station, at a new location, as the line was extended to Hopeman.

== History ==
The branch line from Alves was constructed by the Inverness and Aberdeen Junction Railway (I&AJR). Construction began in January 1862 and the first trains ran on 22 December 1862. Burghead's first station was located on the east foreshore and as well as passenger services provided freight facilities to Burghead harbour. Four passenger trains per day ran each way between Burghead and Keith with connections to Inverness by changing at Alves.

The I&AJR became part of the Highland Railway in 1865 and in 1892 the Highland company extended the branch line from Burghead to Hopeman. This necessitated a new line to be constructed from a junction just south of the town and the railway station was relocated to this newly constructed line, approximately 0.24 miles (380 m) from the original station. The new station opened on 10 October 1892. The original station continued to handle all freight and the line to the original station became known as the Burghead harbour line.

In 1923 the line became part of the London, Midland and Scottish Railway. By the end of the 1920s passenger revenue on the line was becoming uneconomic and the last passenger services ran on 12 September 1931.

Despite being closed the station was host to two LMS caravans from 1935 to 1939. A camping coach was also positioned here by the Scottish Region from 1954 to 1963.

Freight service continued to run but on 31 December 1957 the freight service beyond Burghead to Hopeman was withdrawn and in 1966 general freight services were withdrawn from the rest of the branch line resulting in the full closure of Burghead station. The line continued to by used for delivering grain to Burghead maltings until 1992. Following the cessation of the grain traffic the line was lifted from the harbour branch to a point south of Burghead. The line laid abandoned until final closure in 2017 as part of the Aberdeen–Inverness improvement project.

The platforms of the first station are still in place but the new station buildings were destroyed by fire in 2003 and no trace remains of the second station.

Preceding station	Disused railways	Following station
Coltfield Platform	Highland Railway; Burghead (1st station)	Terminus
Coltfield Platform	Highland Railway; Burghead (2nd station)	Cummingston
