= Coltfield Platform railway station =

Railway station in Moray, Scotland

Coltfield Platform Wards

General information
- Location: Burghead, Moray; Scotland
- Coordinates: 57.6602°N 3.4729°W, NJ122643
- Platforms: 1

Other information
- Status: Disused

History
- Original company: Inverness and Aberdeen Junction Railway
- Pre-grouping: Highland Railway
- Post-grouping: London, Midland and Scottish Railway

Key dates
- 22 December 1862: Station opened
- 14 September 1931: Passenger services withdrawn
- 2017: Line closed
Location

Coltfield Platform railway station stood on the Burghead and Hopeman Branch of the Inverness and Aberdeen Junction Railway and later the Highland Railway that once served the rural area of Coltfield and Wards in the Scottish district of Moray (formerly Elginshire). It was opened as Wards railway station in 1862 and was renamed as Coltfield railway station in 1865 before finally becoming Coltfield Platform in 1880. The station lay 2 mi 20 chains (3.6 km) from Alves railway station.

== History ==
The Inverness and Aberdeen Junction Railway opened the branch from Alves Junction in 1862. Services ran to Keith or to Inverness by changing at Alves.

In 1865 the line was taken over by the Highland Railway and in 1923 became part of the London, Midland and Scottish Railway. The last passenger train however ran on 12 September 1931. The branch line continued in use for grain deliveries until 1998 and was only formally closed as late as 2017 and the track lifted.

== Infrastructure ==
The simple short platform on the single track line had no passing loop, sidings, signal box or signals, but had a small shelter and it was reached by a path that ran from steps that led down from the overbridge near Easter Coltfield. Standing on the eastern side of the line it was opened to serve the gravel pit and works at Easter Coltfield, the hamlets of Wards and Coltfield as well as the local farms, etc and remained open until 14 September 1931; freight facilities were not provided. Nothing now remains of the station and the line has been lifted, however the overbridge still survives. A short cutting lay to the south.

Preceding station	Historical railways	Following station
Alves; Line and station closed	Highland Railway; Inverness and Aberdeen Junction Railway	Burghead; Line closed, station closed
