= Mulben =

Hamlet in Moray, Scotland

Coordinates: 57.5413°N 3.0830°W

Mulben: Scottish Gaelic: Am Muileann Bàn
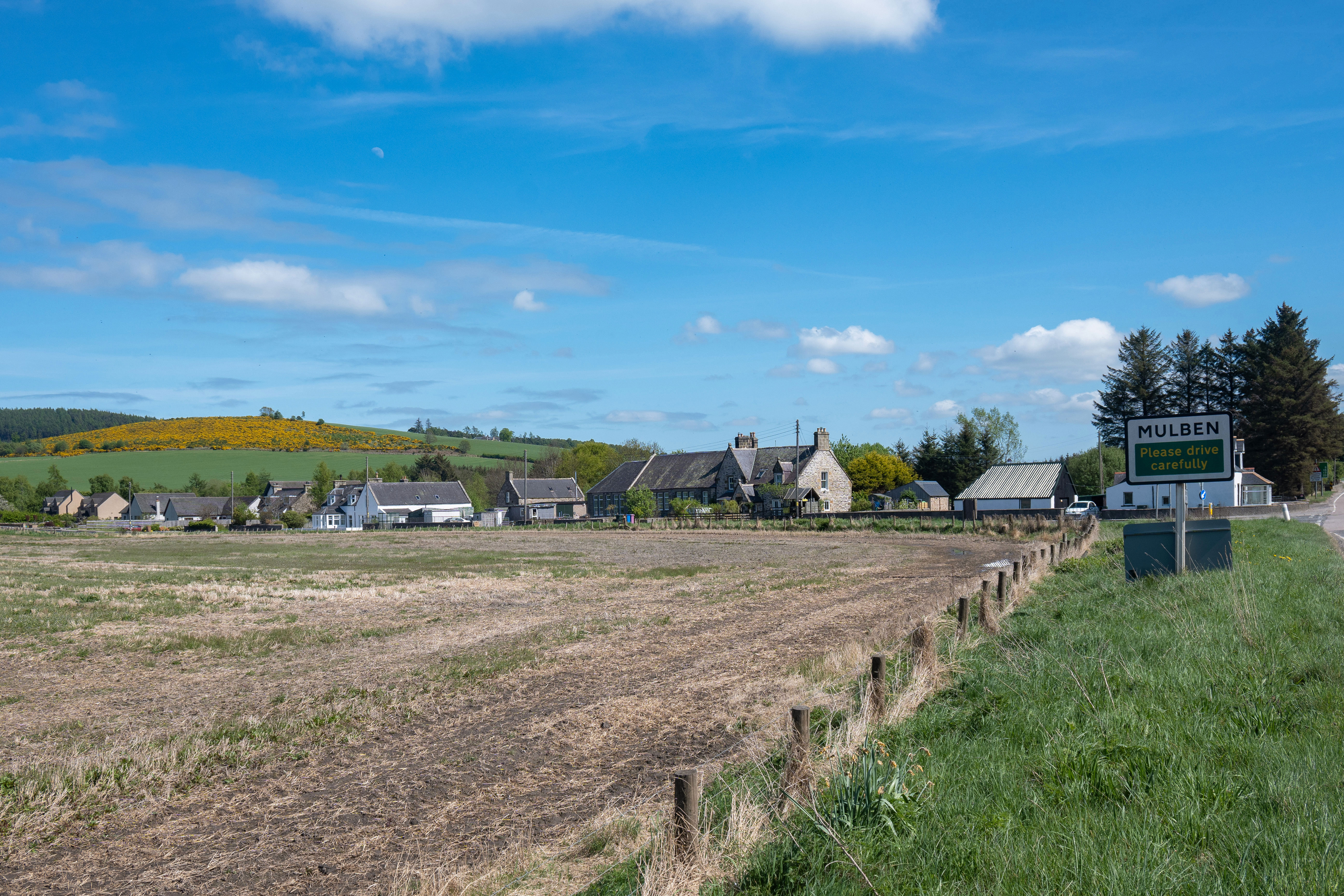
- Main hamlet of Mulben

- Location within Moray
- OS grid reference: NJ2123
- Council area: Moray
- Country: Scotland
- Sovereign state: United Kingdom
- Police: Scotland
- Fire: Scottish
- Ambulance: Scottish

Mulben (Scottish Gaelic: Am Muileann Bàn) is a hamlet situated at a crossroads that forms the intersection of the A95 road and the B9103 in the Moray council area of Scotland.

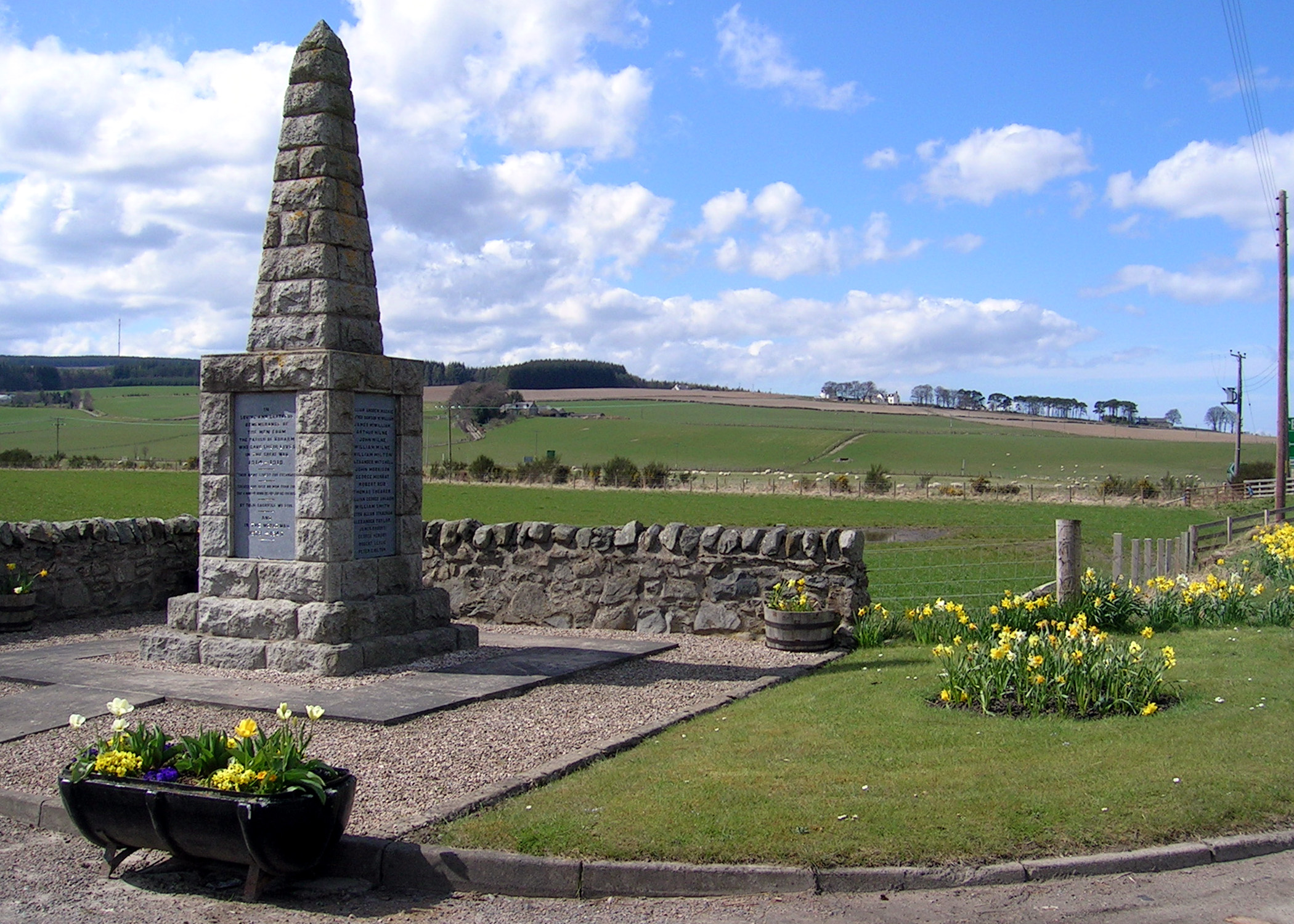
A view looking south west from the Moray village of Mulben's war memorial

It lies on the Burn of Mulben, 6.5 km (4 miles) west of Keith. Upon the arrival of the railway in 1858 linking it with Keith in the east and Elgin to the west it developed allowing the establishment of a primary school and a small number of services. Although the railway still remains, the station closed in 1964 and the building is now a private dwelling.

Close by is the Glentauchers distillery to the east (opened in 1898) and the Auchroisk distillery to the west (opened in 1974). Tauchers Platform railway station served Glentauchers distillery and the hamlet of Tauchers.

Upon the hill that commands the heights above the hamlet, one's view from afar is dominated by the extensive complex of bond sheds that form Malcolmburn, owned by and for the maturation of Chivas Regal. A small farm upon the road that leads in that northerly direction called House of Mulben has also become a tourist attraction by offering such activities as archery, clay pigeon shooting, off-road driving with Land Rover Defenders, zorbing and the chance to fish in a small, private lake.
