= Alves railway station =

Disused railway station in Alves, Moray

Coordinates: 57.63745°N 3.45026°W

Alves
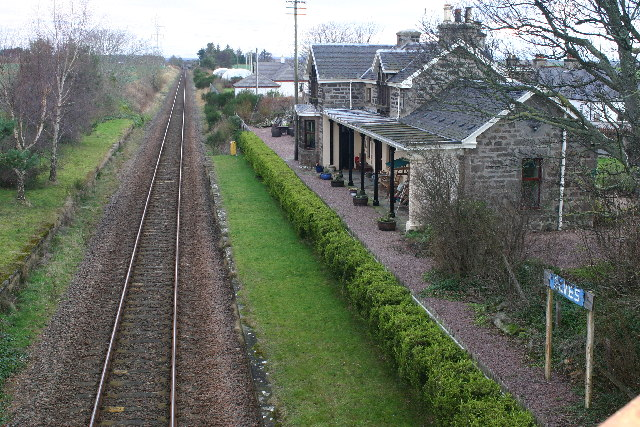
- The station buildings in 2006

General information
- Location: Alves, Moray; Scotland
- Platforms: 2

Other information
- Status: Disused

History
- Original company: Inverness and Aberdeen Junction Railway
- Pre-grouping: Highland Railway
- Post-grouping: London, Midland and Scottish Railway

Key dates
- 25 November 1858: Station opened
- 3 May 1965: Station closed
Location

Alves was a railway station located near Elgin, in the Scottish administrative area of Moray. The station was the junction where the line to Burghead and Hopeman diverged from the line from Aberdeen to Inverness.

== History ==
Opened by the Inverness and Aberdeen Junction Railway, then absorbed by the Highland Railway, it became part of the London, Midland and Scottish Railway during the Grouping of 1923. The line then passed on to the Scottish Region of British Railways on nationalisation in 1948. It was then closed by the British Railways Board in May 1965 as a result of the Beeching Axe.

Passenger services on the Burghead & Hopeman branch line (opened in 1862) were withdrawn considerably earlier, by the LMS back in September 1931. Goods traffic continued (in the form of grain to the whisky distillery at Roseisle and the maltings at Burghead) until 1992. The section as far the former was reopened in January 1998, but traffic ceased again shortly afterwards and the branch is now disused and overgrown. This line has now been disconnected from the main Aberdeen to Inverness line as part of upgrades to the track and signalling in 2018.

== The site today ==
Trains still pass the site on the Aberdeen to Inverness Line. The station building has survived and is now a private residence.

Preceding station	Disused railways	Following station
Mosstowie; Station closed; line open	Highland Railway; Inverness and Aberdeen Junction Railway	Kinloss; Station closed; line open
Mosstowie; Station closed; line open	Highland Railway; Hopeman Branch	Coltfield Platform; Line and station closed
