= Glentauchers distillery =

Whisky distillery in Moray, Scotland

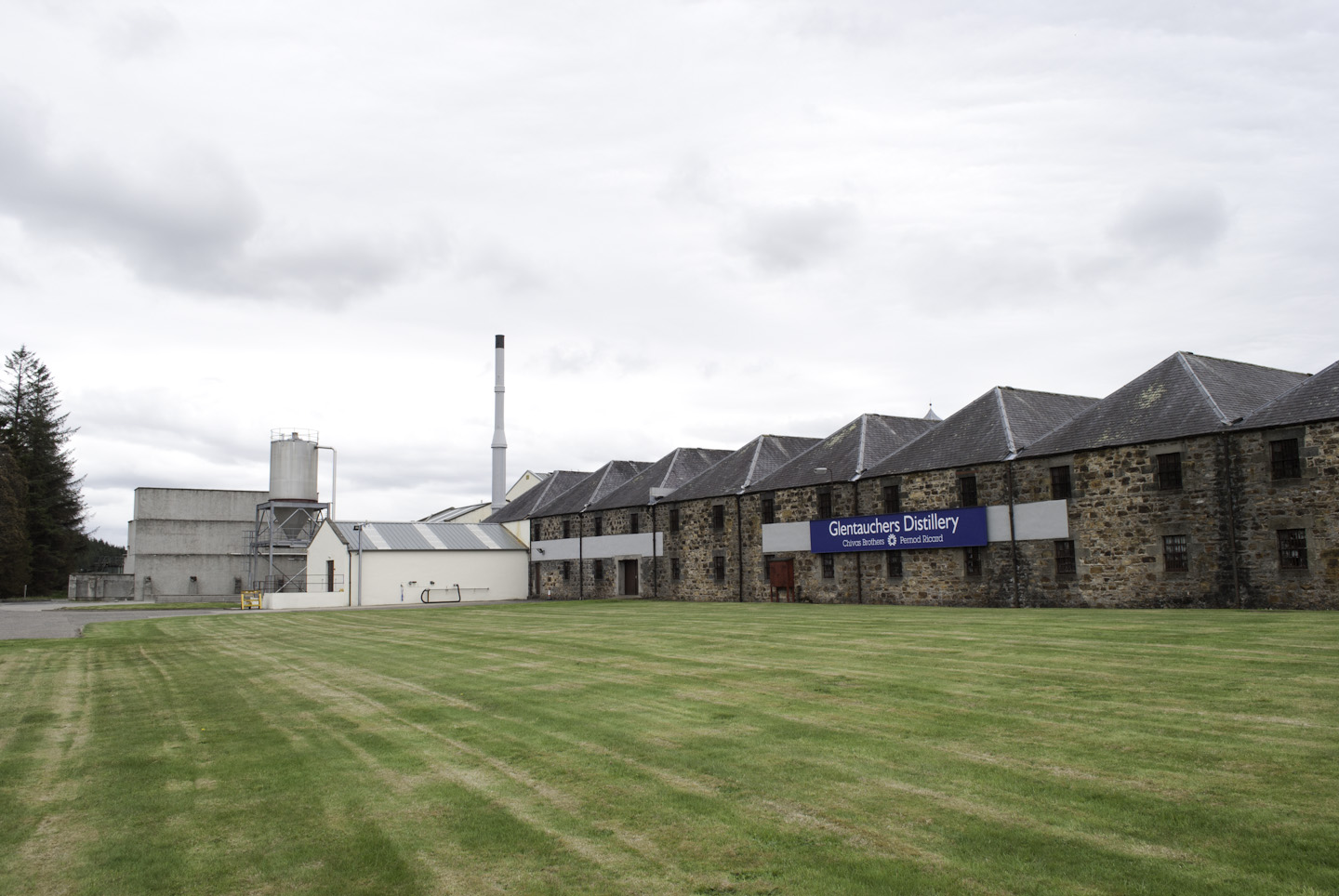

Region: Speyside
- Location: Mulben, Keith, Scotland
- Coordinates: 57°32′3″N 3°3′1″W
- Owner: Chivas Brothers (Pernod Ricard)
- Founded: 1897
- Water source: Rosarie Burn
- No. of stills: 3 wash stills 3 spirit stills
- Capacity: 4,500,000 litres (990,000 imp gal)
- Mothballed: 1985–1992

Glentauchers distillery (/ɡlɛnˈtɒxərz/) is a Speyside Scottish whisky distillery in Mulben, Keith, Scotland.

== History ==
Glentauchers distillery was founded in 1897. The building was designed by John Alcock, and overseen by Charles Doig & Son. It starting producing when James Buchanan Co. Ltd. and three members of Glentauchers Distillery Co. joined hands with Glentauchers a year after that.

In 1925 James Buchanan Co. Ltd join The Distillers Company.

It was mothballed by United Distillers in 1985, and sold to Allied Distillers in 1989. Malts from this distillery are rarely bottled, usually, the produced whisky is used in blended whiskies. In 2000, an official bottling was released. This was a 15-year-old whisky. Before that a semi-official bottling was released by Gordon & MacPhail in the 1990s.

The distillery has three spirit stills and three wash stills, with a total production capacity of 4,500,000 litres (990,000 imp gal) of pure alcohol per year.

The distillery and the hamlet of Tauchers were served by Tauchers Platform railway station until 1964 with a freight siding also at one time running to the distillery.
