= Kinloss railway station =

Disused railway station in Kinloss, Moray

Kinloss

General information
- Location: Kinloss, Moray; Scotland
- Coordinates: 57.632°N 3.5579°W
- Grid reference: NJ070613
- Platforms: 2

Other information
- Status: Disused

History
- Original company: Inverness and Aberdeen Junction Railway
- Pre-grouping: Highland Railway
- Post-grouping: London, Midland and Scottish Railway

Key dates
- 25 March 1858: Opened
- 18 April 1860: Resited
- May 1904: Moved back to original site
- 3 May 1965: Closed to passengers
- 7 November 1966: Closed completely
Location

Kinloss railway station served the village of Kinloss, Moray, Scotland from 1858 to 1966 on the Inverness and Aberdeen Junction Railway.

== History ==
The station opened on 25 March 1858 by the Inverness and Aberdeen Junction Railway. It was resited on 18 April 1860, to the east, but it was moved back to its original location in May 1904. It closed to passengers on 3 May 1965 and completely on 7 November 1966.

Preceding station	Historical railways	Following station
Forres (old); Line open, station closed	Inverness and Aberdeen Junction Railway	Alves; Line open, station closed
