= Highland Railway =

Former British railway company

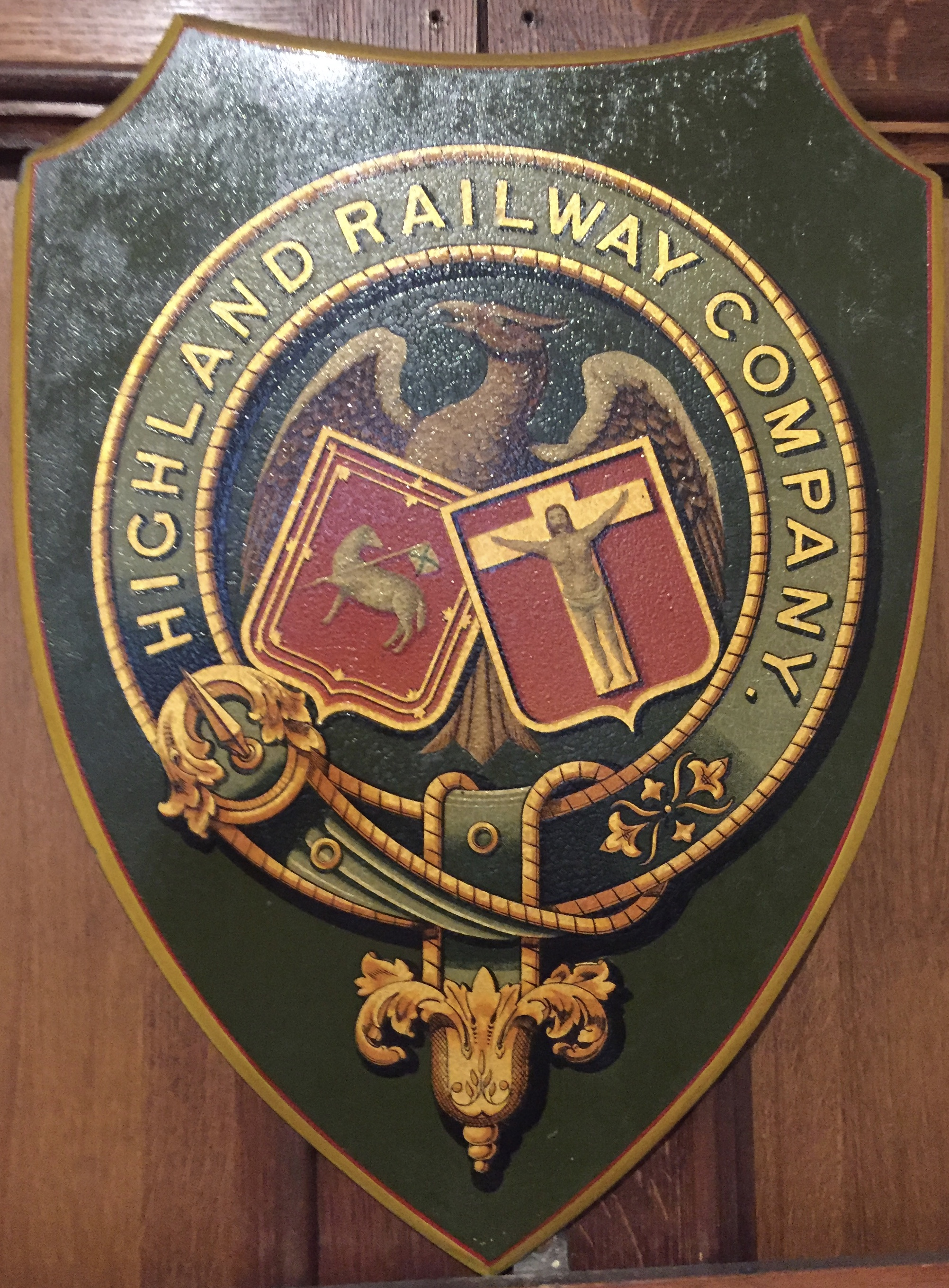

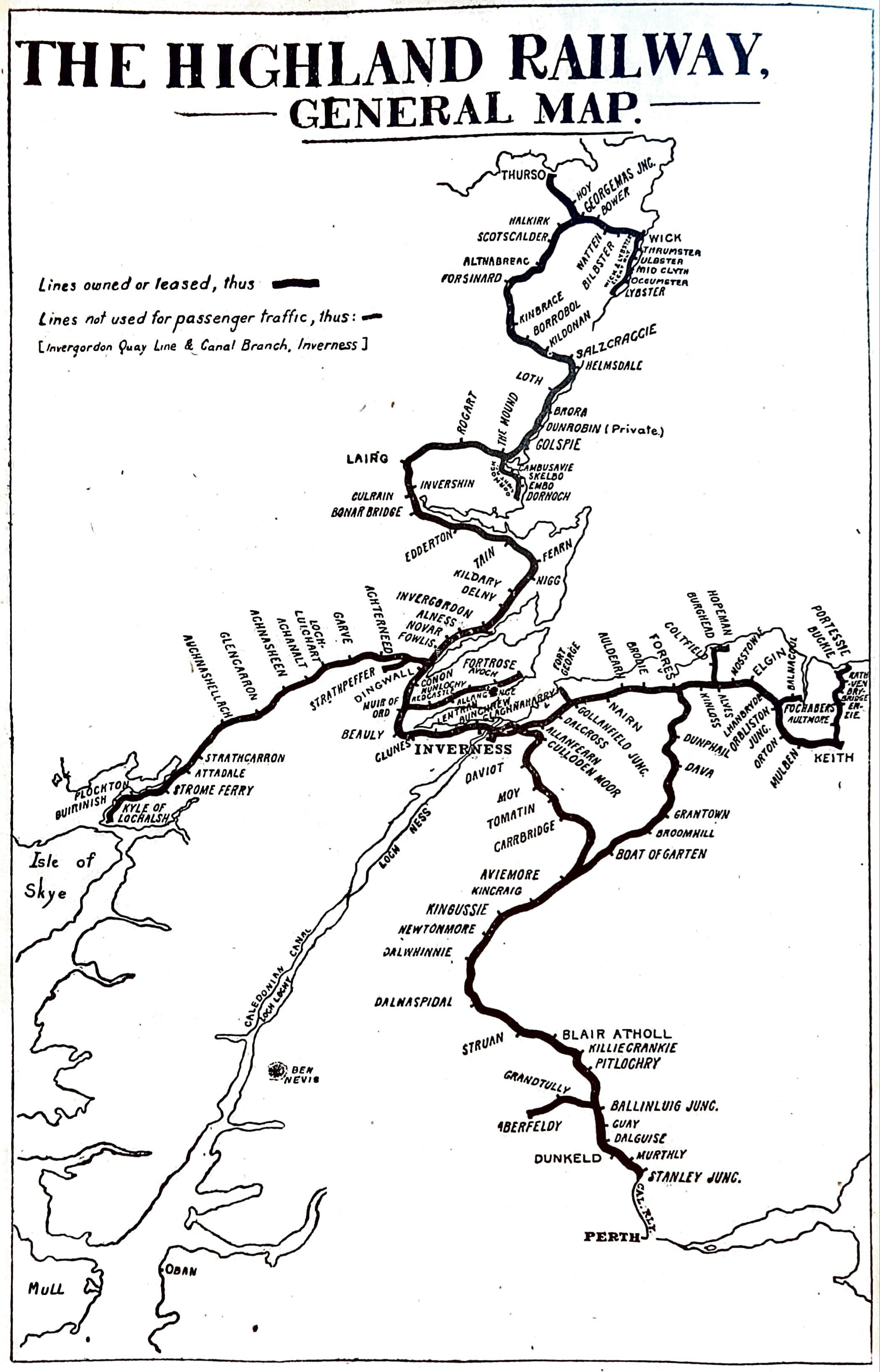
- 1920 map of the railway

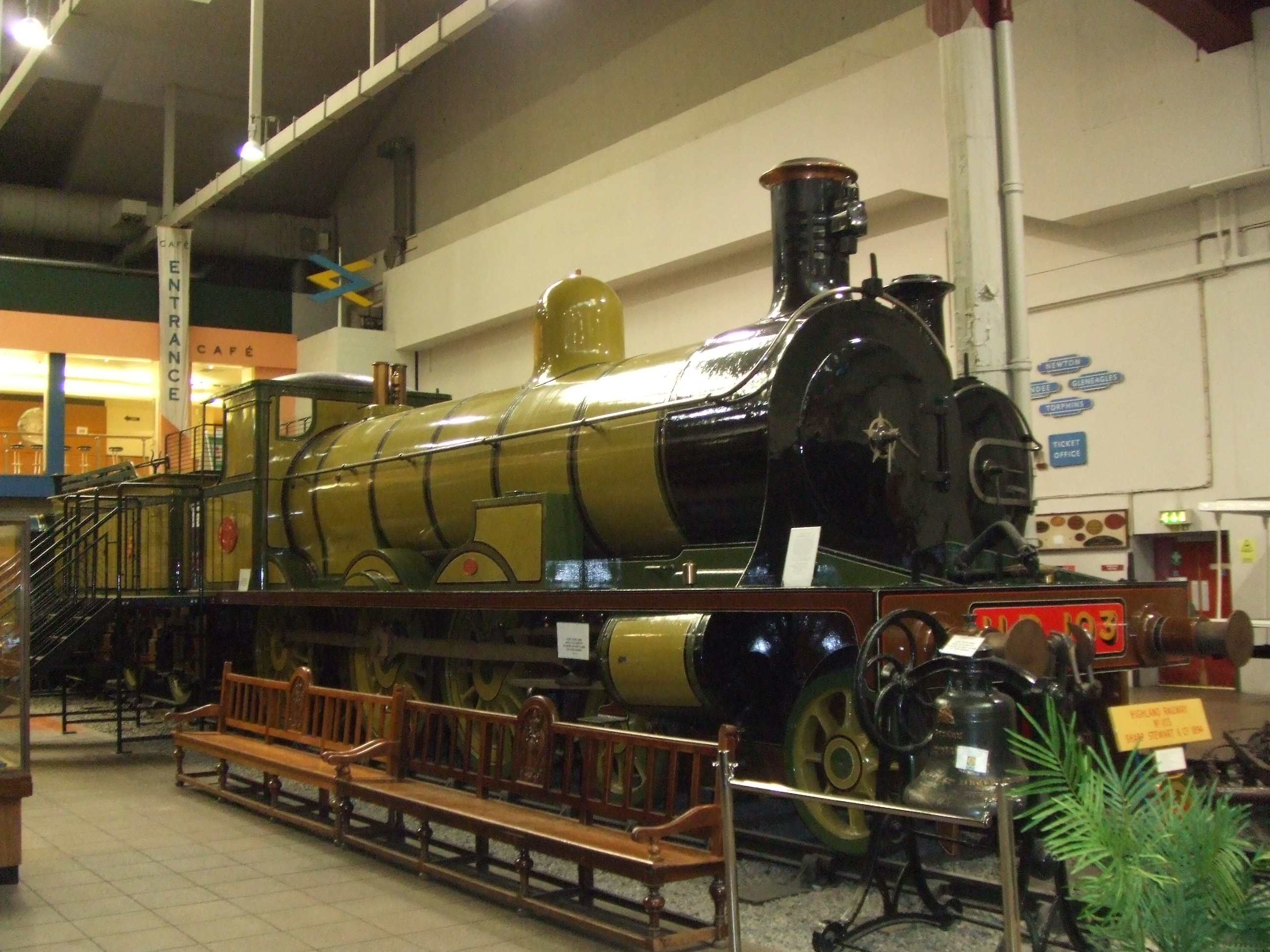
- Highland Railway "Jones Goods" (L.M.S. "4F") No.103 (L.M.S. No.17916), built by Sharp, Stewart in 1894

Overview
- Headquarters: Inverness
- Reporting mark: HR
- Dates of operation: 1865–1923
- Predecessor: Inverness and Aberdeen Junction Railway; Inverness and Perth Junction Railway
- Successor: London, Midland and Scottish Railway

Technical
- Track gauge: 4 ft 8 1/2 in (1,435 mm) standard gauge
- Length: 505 miles 79 chains (814.3 km) (1919)
- Track length: 667 miles 65 chains (1,074.7 km) (1919)

The Highland Railway (HR) was one of the two smallest of the five major Scottish railway companies prior to the 1923 Grouping, operating north of Perth railway station in Scotland and serving the farthest north of Britain. Based in Inverness, the company was formed by merger in 1865, absorbing over 249 miles (401 km) of line. It continued to expand, reaching Wick and Thurso in the north and Kyle of Lochalsh in the west, eventually serving the counties of Caithness, Sutherland, Ross & Cromarty, Inverness, Perth, Nairn, Moray and Banff. Southward it connected with the Caledonian Railway at Stanley Junction, north of Perth, and eastward with the Great North of Scotland Railway at Boat of Garten, Elgin, Keith and Portessie.

During the First World War the British Navy's base at Scapa Flow, in the Orkney Islands, was serviced from Scrabster Harbour near Thurso. The Highland Railway provided transport, including a daily Jellicoe Express passenger special, which ran between London and Thurso in about 22 hours. In 1923, the company passed on approximately 494 miles (795 km) of line as it became part of the London, Midland and Scottish Railway. Although its shorter branches have closed, former Highland Railway lines remain open from Inverness to Wick and Thurso, Kyle of Lochalsh, Keith (as part of the Aberdeen to Inverness Line), as well as the direct main line south to Perth.

== History ==
=== Origins ===
The Highland Railway was formed in 1865 by a merger of two companies centred on Inverness: the Inverness & Aberdeen Junction Railway extending to the east; and the Inverness & Perth Junction Railway to the south.

==== Inverness and Aberdeen Junction Railway ====
The first proposals for rail links to Inverness were made in 1845. These were the Great North of Scotland Railway (GNoSR) between Inverness and Aberdeen and so link up with the railways to the south; the Perth & Inverness Railway, proposing a direct route over the Grampian Mountains to Perth; and the Aberdeen, Banff & Elgin Railway, with a route that followed the coast to better serve the Banffshire and Morayshire fishing ports. The Aberdeen, Banff & Elgin failed to raise funds and the Perth & Inverness Railway was rejected by Parliament because the railway would be at altitudes that approached 1,500 feet (460 m) and needed steep gradients. The Great North of Scotland Railway Act 1846 (9 & 10 Vict. c. ciii) received royal assent on 26 June 1846, authorizing a 108 1/4-mile (174.2 km) route needing few major engineering works. Two years later the railway mania bubble had burst and the necessary finances could not be raised. Construction eventually began in November 1852, albeit only 39 miles (63 km) to Huntly, and this line was officially opened on 19 September 1854. An extension to Keith, halfway between Aberdeen and Inverness, opened on 11 October 1856.

The Great North of Scotland and Inverness and Aberdeen Junction Railway route between Aberdeen and Inverness that opened in August 1858.

Meanwhile the 15-mile (24 km) Inverness and Nairn Railway had been given permission for a line between Inverness and Nairn, together with a 1/2-mile (0.80 km) branch to Inverness Harbour, on 24 July 1854. The line opened ceremonially on 5 November 1855 when a train of thirty vehicles, mainly goods wagons fitted with seats, made a return journey. Intermediate stations opened at Culloden (later Allanfearn), Dalcross, Fort George (later Gollanfield Junction) and Cawdor. (Note: Cawdor became Kildrummie in 1857 before closing the following year.) Initially three trains a day ran between Inverness and Nairn, horse-drawn coaches providing a link to Keith and thereby Aberdeen via the Great North of Scotland Railway. The Inverness & Nairn planned an extension as far as Elgin; between Elgin and Keith the River Spey needed to be crossed. The GNoSR offered £40,000 towards a bridge and the Inverness and Aberdeen Junction Railway (IAJR) was given authority for a line from Nairn and Keith in July 1856. A temporary station at Dalvey, west of the River Findhorn, opened on 22 December 1857, to close when the line extended to Elgin on 25 March 1858. Keith, and the GNoSR, was reached on 18 August 1858. Three services a day ran between Inverness and Aberdeen, Aberdeen being reached in between 5 hours 55 minutes to 6 hours 30 minutes. The Spey Bridge was unfinished when the line opened, so initially passengers walked across the adjacent road bridge as the locomotive was detached and crossed before the carriages were hauled over by ropes. The Inverness and Aberdeen Junction absorbed the Inverness & Nairn in 1861.

The Morayshire Railway had opened a 5 1/2-mile (8.9 km) line between Lossiemouth and Elgin on 10 August 1852, public services starting the next day. Permission was granted to the Morayshire to run over the IAJR to Orton and to build a branch to Rothes. The IAJR opened the line on 18 August 1858 and the Morayshire started running services on 23 August. Conflict soon arose between the IAJR and Morayshire Railway, and the directors of the Morayshire responded with plans to build their own line between the two stations. The Great North sponsored the new line and offered to provide services after the lines had been physically connected. Permission was granted on 3 July 1860, goods were carried from 30 December 1861 and passengers from 1 January 1862. The Morayshire was operated by the Great North of Scotland from 1866 and was absorbed in 1881.

Between Forres and Elgin two branches opened, the first being from Kinloss to Findhorn; 3 miles (4.8 km) long this operated independently from 18 April 1860 before being taken over by the IAJR in 1862. The IAJR also opened a 5 1/2-mile (8.9 km) branch from Alves to Burghead on 22 December 1862.

==== Inverness and Ross-shire Railway ====
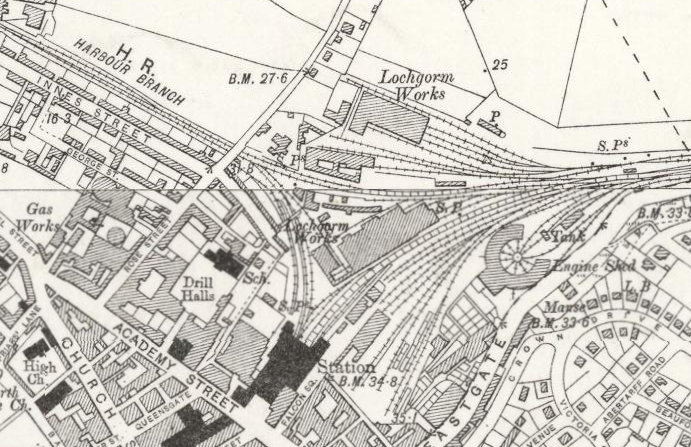
OS map of Inverness station in 1902

The Inverness and Ross-shire Railway was given permission on 3 July 1860 to build a railway the 31 miles (50 km) from Inverness to Invergordon. After the section to Dingwall was complete and given the necessary permission by the Board of Trade on 10 June 1862, the line opened to traffic the following day. The terminus at Inverness was not situated to allow through traffic, so additional platforms were built on the west side and the layout arranged as a Y. The Rose Street curve joined the two lines, and most arriving trains would take this curve past the station and then reverse into the platforms, allowing easy interchange and through carriages. The line to Invergordon opened on 25 March 1863, delayed due to conflict over the line crossing the Ferry Road at Findon. The original plans were for a level crossing, but following protests a bridge was built.

Within a month of opening, on 30 June 1862, the Inverness and Ross-shire Railway was absorbed by the Inverness and Aberdeen Junction Railway. Initially there were four services a day, connecting with trains from Keith at Inverness, and averaging 1 hour 40 minutes for the 31 miles (50 km), and one train a day on Sundays, the mail train.

A 26 1/2-mile (42.6 km) extension to Bonar Bridge (later Ardgay) was authorised by the Inverness and Aberdeen Junction Railway (Bonar Bridge Extension) Act 1863 (26 & 27 Vict. c. xxxii) on 11 May 1863. The line opened as far as Meikle Ferry on 1 June 1864 and to Bonar Bridge on 1 October 1864. Initially connections to the ferry were provided from Meikle Ferry, but these began to serve Bonar Bridge soon after the station had opened, and Meikle Ferry station closed in 1869.

==== Inverness and Perth Junction Railway ====
When the Highland Railway was created by merger in 1865, it operated over 249 miles of line

Although in 1860 Inverness had a rail link to the south, the route via Aberdeen was circuitous and involved a change between two railway stations over 1/2-mile (0.80 km) apart. Passengers were conveyed between the termini by omnibus, paid for in the through fare and with forty five minutes being allowed for the transfer. The GNoSR refused to hold its trains to connect with trains arriving at Guild Street. The mail train would be held until the Post Office van had arrived and the mail was on board, but the station locked at the advertised departure time to prevent connecting passengers further delaying the train. A more direct 111 3/4-mile (179.8 km) long route south to Perth, bypassing Aberdeen, was planned. This left the Inverness & Aberdeen Junction at Forres on a steeply graded line, before heading south to a 1,052-foot (321 m) summit at Dava, then to Grantown and the River Spey to Kingussie, before another climb to a summit at the Pass of Druimuachdar, at 1,484 feet (452 m) the highest in Britain. (Note: This was surpassed between 1902 and 1934 by the Leadhills and Wanlockhead Branch with a height above sea level of 1,498 feet (457 m).) The line then descended to Birnam, 15 1/2 miles (24.9 km) from Perth and linked to Perth by the Perth & Dunkeld Railway since 1856. Although a similar route had been rejected in 1845 because of the high altitudes and speed gradients, there had been sufficient advance in locomotive design to satisfy the fears of the parliamentary committee, and authority was given in 1861. A 515-foot (157 m) long girder bridge crossed the River Tay near Dalguise and a 477-foot (145 m) viaduct crossed the River Divie near Dunphail. (Note: The Edinkillie Railway Viaduct has been placed on the list of buildings with Historic Interest in Category B.) North of Dunkeld was a 350 yards (320 m) long tunnel and with 128 yards (117 m) through the Pass of Killiecrankie. The line was initially single track with passing loops at stations, the IAJR doubling the track for 6 3/4 miles (10.9 km) between Inverness and Dalcross in 1864.

Work started in 1861, and the 13 miles from Dunkeld to Pitlochry opened on 1 June 1863. To allow access to the new line from both Keith and Inverness a new triangular station was built at Forres south of the old line, which was retained for goods traffic. The line from this new station to Aviemore opened on 3 August, the complete line opening on 9 September 1863. Initially two through trains a day ran between Perth and Inverness, taking about six hours. These were supplemented by additional mixed slow services from Perth to Blair Atholl and from Inverness to Aviemore. Additional services ran after 1866; only the mail train ran on Sundays.

A 9-mile (14 km) branch from Ballinluig to Aberfeldy was also authorised, and this opened on 3 July 1865. The Inverness & Perth Junction Railway absorbed the Perth & Dunkeld in 1864.

==== Genesis ====
Highland Railway Act 1865
- Act of Parliament
- Parliament of the United Kingdom
- Long title: An Act to authorize the Consolidation into One Undertaking of the Inverness and Perth Junction and the Inverness and Aberdeen Junction Railways, and the Union into One Company of the Two Companies to which the said Railways respectively belong; to consolidate and amend the Acts relating to the same Companies; and for other Purposes.
- Citation: 28 & 29 Vict. c. clxviii

Dates
- Royal assent: 29 June 1865

Text of statute as originally enacted

The Inverness and Aberdeen Junction and the Inverness and Perth Junction Railway were merged on 1 February 1865, and became known as the Highland Railway after the passing of the Highland Railway Act 1865 (28 & 29 Vict. c. clxviii) on 29 June 1865. The railway owned 242 miles (389 km) of line and operated over the 7 1/4 miles (11.7 km) of Scottish North Eastern Railway (SNER) line from Stanley Junction to Perth. Apart from this line and that between Inverness and Dalcross, this was all single track railway. Andrew Dougall, who had been founding General Manager of both railways, became its first General Manager. William Barclay had been locomotive supervisor for both constituent railways, resigned in 1865, and the first Highland Railway locomotive supervisor was William Stroudley.

=== Far North Line ===
==== Sutherland Railway ====
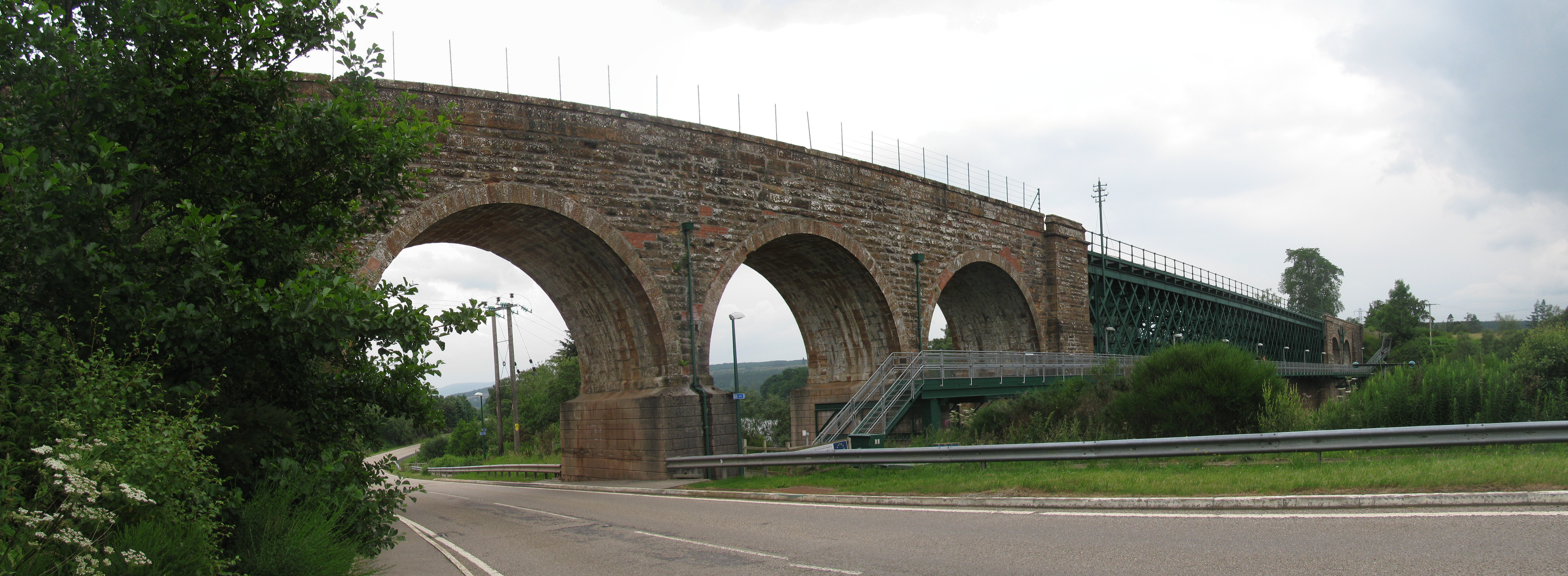
Shin Viaduct, a category A listed structure, crossing the Kyle of Sutherland

The Sutherland Railway received permission in 1865 for a 32 3/4-mile (52.7 km) extension of the Highland Railway from Bonar Bridge to Brora. The route followed the Kyle of Sutherland inland for 3 miles, before crossing over to the north shore with the five masonry arches and 230 feet (70 m) girder span of Invershin Viaduct. The Highland contributed £15,000, but only 26 miles (42 km) of line were built, the railway opening as far as Golspie on 13 April 1868. Either side of the viaduct across the Kyle are Culrain and Invershin stations, 36 chains (790 yd; 720 m) apart. The Highland provided two services a day north of Tain, with through carriages to Perth on the mail train.

==== Duke of Sutherland's Railway ====
The 3rd Duke of Sutherland planned an extension of the line 17 miles (27 km) from Golspie to Helmsdale, passing Dunrobin Castle, his family seat. Work had already started when authority was obtained in 1870, and the section from Dunrobin to about 3/4-mile (1.2 km) short of Helmsdale was complete that autumn. The duke purchased a locomotive and some carriages, and the line was opened by Princess Christian on 1 November 1870. Two trains a day ran until 19 June 1871, when the line was connected up with the Sutherland Railway at Golspie and the Highland extended its services to Helmsdale.

==== Sutherland and Caithness Railway ====
A railway linking Thurso and Wick had been proposed in the 1860s and had the necessary authority in 1866, but had failed to raise the necessary funds. The Sutherland and Caithness Railway was authorised to take over the route of the Thurso and Wick Railway, and extend the line south to link up with the Duke of Sutherland's Railway at Helmsdale. With the Duke of Sutherland subscribing £60,000 and the Highland Railway £50,000, the railway opened on 28 July 1874. Initially two trains a day covered the 161 1/2 miles (259.9 km) from Inverness to Wick in between 7 and 7 1/2 hours, by 1885 the fastest trains were taking 6 hours, and in 1914 the Further North Express took 5 1/2 hours.

==== Dingwall and Skye Railway ====
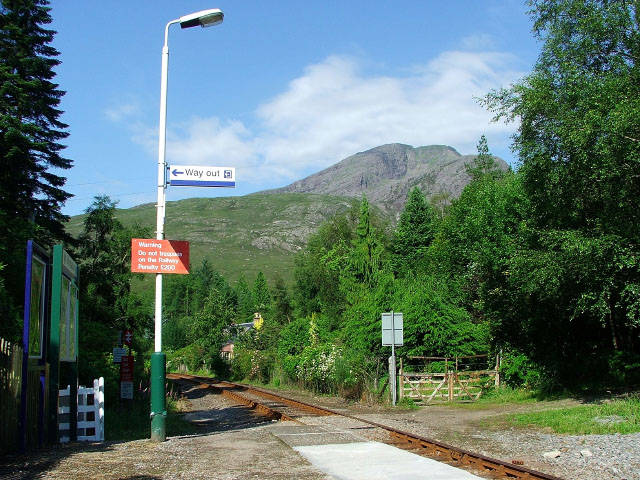
View from Achnashellach railway station, built by the Dingwall and Skye Railway

Only certain routes are practicable in the Highlands due to the terrain, but from Dingwall it was possible to reach Kyle of Lochalsh on the west coast, opposite the Isle of Skye. Permission was granted in 1865, but landowners in Strathpeffer opposed the railway and created difficulties buying the land. In 1868, permission was granted for a different route, 2 miles (3.2 km) to the north of the spa town. The terminus was 10 miles (16 km) short to Strome Ferry, because of the cost of building a line around the coast to the Kyle of Lochalsh. The railway opened on 5 August 1870 for goods and passengers were carried from 19 August. Two trains a day were provided, either connecting with trains or providing through carriages at Dingwall. One train a day connected with steamers from Strome Ferry to Portree on Skye, and to Stornoway on Lewis. No Sunday services were provided, possibly because the traffic wasn't sufficient, but also it recorded that on a Sunday in 1883 villagers at Strome Ferry, determined to keep the Sabbath, prevented the loading of a special fish goods train until midnight had passed.

==== Steamships ====
The Dingwall and Skye Railway purchased two steamers, Jura and Oscar, to operate the services to Portree and Stornoway. Initially a daily service was provided to Portree, and a weekly service to Stornoway, but the first winter the frequency of the Portree service was reduced and the Stornoway service suspended. Oscar ran aground in November 1870, to be replaced with Carham and a new ship, named Ferret, was purchased to replace Jura. It was found that most of the work could be carried out with Carham, and Ferret was offered for charter. A three-month lease was agreed and paid for, but the ship went missing. It was discovered later in Melbourne, Australia, when offered for sale under an assumed name that the port authorities could not identify in the records. The company withdrew in favour of MacBrayne's running the service in 1880.

==== Mergers ====
Highland Railway (Northern Lines Amalgamation) Act 1884
- Act of Parliament
- Parliament of the United Kingdom
- Long title: An Act to amalgamate the Undertakings of the Highland, the Sutherland, and the Sutherland and Caithness Railway Companies, and the Duke of Sutherland's Railway; and for other purposes.
- Citation: 47 & 48 Vict. c. clxxxiv

Dates
- Royal assent: 28 July 1884

The Dingwall and Skye Railway was absorbed by the Highland Railway by the Highland and Dingwall and Skye Railways Amalgamation Act 1880 (43 & 44 Vict. c. cxxix), and the Sutherland, Duke of Sutherland's and Sutherland & Caithness Railways were absorbed by the Highland Railway (Northern Lines Amalgamation) Act 1884 (47 & 48 Vict. c. clxxxiv).

=== Expansion ===
==== Branch lines ====
In 1881 the GNoSR applied to Parliament to extend the line from Portsoy along the Moray Firth to Buckie, but this was rejected after the Highland opposed. The following year, both the Great North and Highland railways applied to Parliament for permission, the Great North for a line from Portsoy along the coast through Buckie to Elgin, and the Highland for a branch from Keith to Buckie and Cullen. Authority was granted in the Great North of Scotland (Buckie Extension) Railway Act 1882 (45 & 46 Vict. c. cxxvi) and the Highland Railway Act 1882 (45 & 46 Vict. c. cxxiv), but in the case of the Highland Railway only for a 13 3/4-mile (22.1 km) line as far as Portessie, with running rights over the Great North coast line between Buckie and Portsoy and the Great North obtaining reciprocal rights over the Highland railway between Elgin and Forres. The Portessie branch opened on 1 August 1884 and the Highland did not exercise its running rights over the GNoSR, thus preventing the Great North running over its lines west of Elgin.

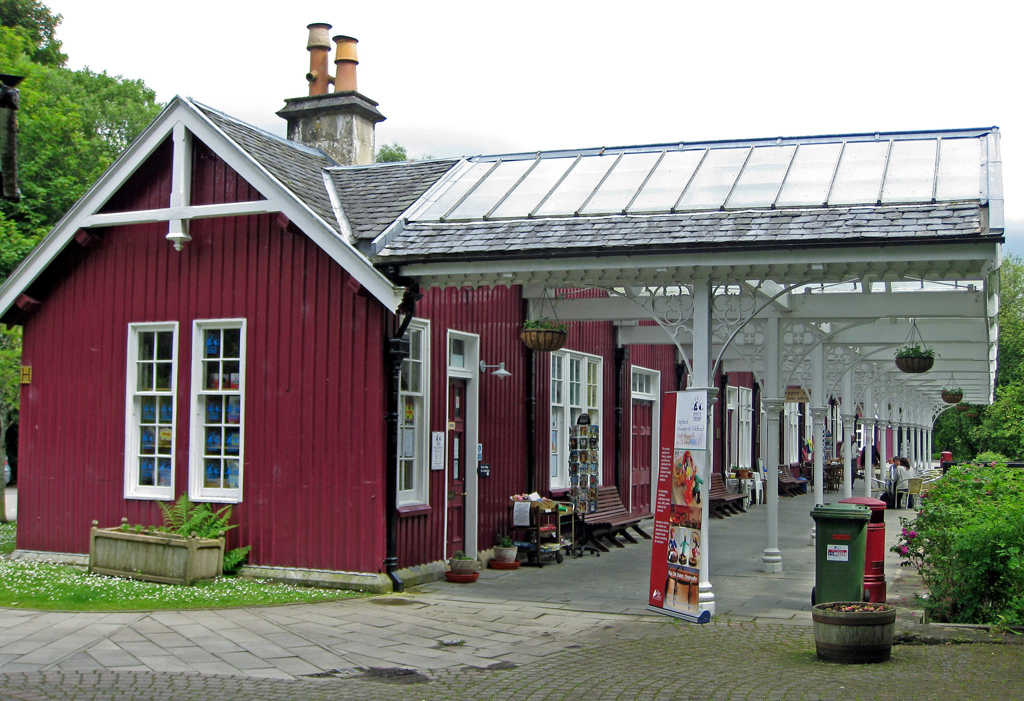
Strathpeffer terminus, now closed, in 2011

The Dingwall & Skye had needed to avoid Strathpeffer, and their station on the main line was 1 1/2 miles (2.4 km) away. The Highland obtained authority for a 2 1/4-mile (3.6 km) branch into the spa town. This opened on 3 June 1885 and the original Strathpeffer station was renamed Achterneed. On 10 October 1892 the Burghead branch was extended 2 miles (3.2 km) along the coast to Hopeman. Fochabers was served by two stations, both inconvenient. The Inverness and Aberdeen Railway had opened a Fochabers station in 1858, but this was 4 miles (6.4 km) from the town. In 1886 the GNoSR opened a station called Fochabers-on-Spey, also about 4 miles (6.4 km) away on their Coast Line. The Highland built a 3-mile (4.8 km) branch from their line to new Fochabers Town station; the line and station opened 1 June 1894.

A branch from Muir of Ord was built to serve rich farmland and Fortrose on the Black Isle. Permission had been granted for the 15 3/4 miles (25.3 km) to reach Rosemarkie, and the line to Fortrose was opened on 1 February 1894, and work did not start on the planned extension. Although it was possible for a ferry to Skye to pick up passengers at Strome Ferry, a port at the original terminus at Kyle of Lochalsh would have been more convenient. However, in 1889 the West Highland Railway was authorised by the West Highland Railway Act 1889 (52 & 53 Vict. c. cxxxiv) to build a line from Craigendoran to Fort William, which would have given a more direct route south. Permission for the extension to Kyle of Lochalsh was granted by the Highland Railway Act 1893 (56 & 57 Vict. c. xci), and after heavy engineering works the extension to Kyle of Lochalsh opened on 2 November 1897. The West Highland opened a competitive port at Mallaig in 1901, but the Highland kept the mail contract and the traffic between Skye and mainland Scotland. Fort George station, between Inverness and Nairn, was 3 1/2 miles (5.6 km) away from the military post it served. A 1 1/2-mile (2.4 km) branch to the village Ardersier was opened on 1 July 1899, and the junction station renamed Gollanfield Junction and the new terminus became Fort George station.

==== East to Keith and Aberdeen ====
The Great North and Highland had agreed in 1865 that traffic between the two railways would be exchanged at Keith, but in 1886 the GNoSR had two lines to Elgin that, although longer than the Highland's direct line, served more populous areas. The coastal route between Keith and Elgin was 87 1/2 miles (140.8 km) long but had easier gradients than the 80 3/4 miles (130.0 km) via Craigellachie. The Highland's main line south from Inverness was via Forres and the GNoSR felt that the Highland treated the line to Elgin as a branch. In 1883 a shorter route south from Inverness was prompted by an independent company and the bill was defeated in Parliament only after the Highland promised to request authority for a shorter line. The following year, as well as the Highland's more direct line from Aviemore, the Great North proposed a branch from its Speyside Section to Inverness. The Highland Railway route was chosen, but the Great North won a concession that goods and passengers that could be exchanged at any junction with through bookings and with services conveniently arranged.

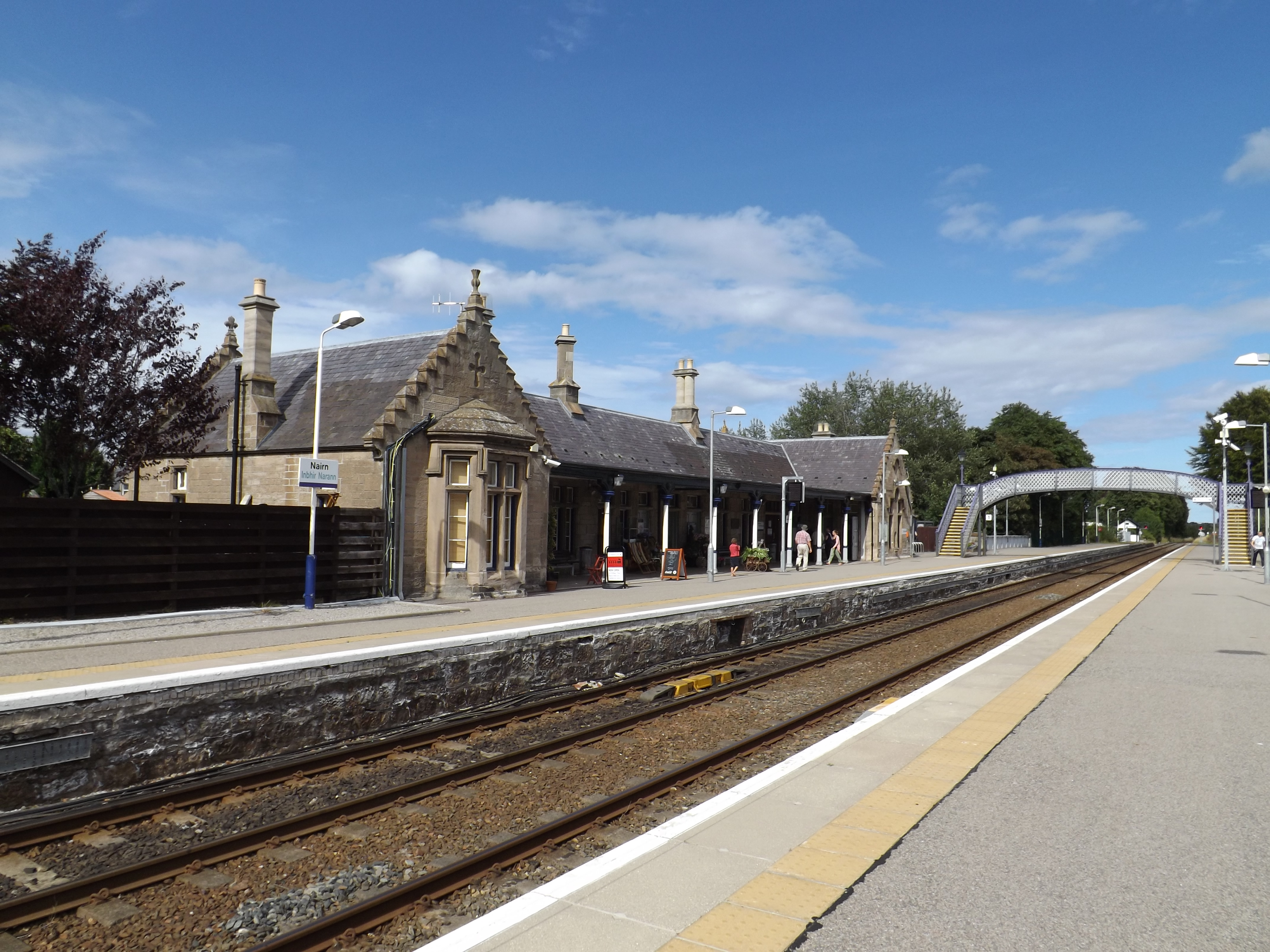
Nairn railway station was built by the Highland in 1885–91, and is currently a Category B Listed Building.

In 1885 the Great North re-timed the 10:10 am Aberdeen service to reach Keith at 11:50 am with through carriages that reached Elgin via Craigellachie at 1 pm. This connected with a Highland service at both Keith and Elgin, until the Highland re-timed the train and broke the connection at Elgin. The Great North applied to the Board of Trade for an order for two connections a day at Elgin. This was refused, but in 1886 the Great North and Highland railways came to an agreement to pool receipts from the stations between Grange and Elgin and refer any disputes to an arbiter. The midday Highland train was re-timed to connect with the Great North at Keith and Elgin, and a service connected at Elgin with an Aberdeen train that had divided en route to travel via the coast and Craigellachie.

However, the Highland Railway cancelled the traffic agreement and withdrew two connecting trains in 1893, complaining that they were not paying. One of the trains was re-instated after an appeal was made to the Railway and Canal Commissioners and a frustrated Great North applied to Parliament in 1895 for running powers to Inverness, but withdrew after it was agreed that the Railway and Canal Commissioners would arbitrate in the matter. With no judgment by 1897, the Great North again prepared to apply again for running powers over the Highland to Inverness, this time agreeing to double track the line, but the commissioners published their finding before the bill was submitted to Parliament. Traffic was to be exchanged at both Elgin and Keith, the services exchanged at Elgin needed to include through carriages from both the Craigellachie and the coast routes, and the timetable had to be approved by the commissioners. The resulting 'Commissioners' Service' started in 1897 with eight though services, four via the Highland to Keith taking between 4 1/2 and 5 hours, and four with carriages exchanged at Elgin with portions that travelled via Craigellachie and the coast, two of these taking 3 1/2 hours. The 3 pm from Inverness to Aberdeen via Keith took 3 hours 5 minutes.

==== South to Perth ====
From 1866 a mixed goods and passenger service left Perth at 1 am, after connecting with the 10 am train from London, and arrived in Inverness at 9 am. A night train service in the return direction started in 1872, leaving Inverness at 7:30 pm to arrive in Perth at 5:05 am. After sleeping carriages were made available from 1878, the train was re-timed to depart at 10 pm and to arrive at 7 am; London could be reached at 9:40 pm. By 1883, there were four services each way between Inverness and Perth, taking between 4 1/2 and 7 hours; two years later the mail trains were rescheduled to take 4 hours with five stops. The loadings on these trains were light in winter, but heavy in July and August with through carriages from other railways being attached. In Express Trains English and Foreign Foxwell reports a doubled headed train with 37 carriages, including 12 horseboxes, from ten railway companies. This train was banked from Blair Atholl. The only train to run on Sundays was the mail train, except between 1878 and 1891 when the Inverness to Perth night train ran Sunday nights.

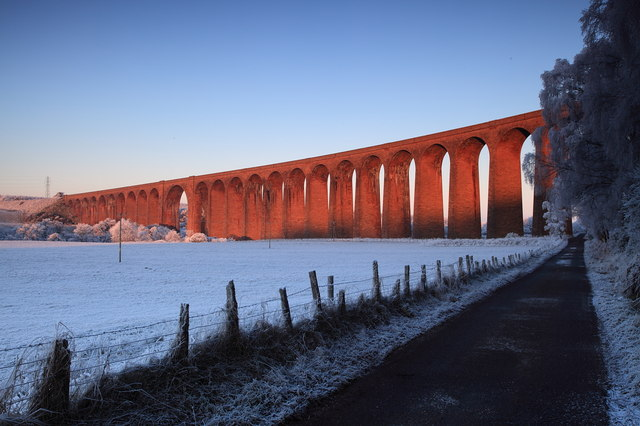
The Nairn viaduct, otherwise known as the Culloden Moor Viaduct is a Category A listed structure.

Permission for a more direct route to Perth, south via Moy and Carrbridge before joining the existing line at Aviemore, was obtained in 1884. Permission for the route to be changed was given in 1887 and again in 1892. Trains heading south had to climb several miles of 1 in 60 gradient, before crossing the 600 yards (550 m) long Nairn Viaduct constructed from 28 arches of red sandstone and the 445-yard (407 m) steel viaduct built over the Findhorn. The line opened from the south, Aviemore to Carr Bridge opening in 1892, to Daviot in 1897 and the line was complete to Inverness on 1 November 1898. The direct line was 118 miles (190 km), 28 miles (45 km) shorter than via Forres, reducing the journey time by about an hour. Sleeping carriages for Inverness from London arrived at Perth via the East Coast, West Coast and Midland routes. These carriages were busy in the summer, but winter traffic could be met with only one carriage. In 1903 the Highland suggested that the three companies run a carriage two days a week; however the Caledonian protested as it would haul only two days a week, whereas the North British Railway would work the other four. For a while, sleeping cars were withdrawn north of Perth; a few years later the Midland Railway withdrew its winter sleeping carriages and the London terminus alternated between Euston and King's Cross.

The line north of the junction at Stanley was single track, resulting in delays, especially after trains had waited for connections at Perth. From 1890, the signalling system using telegraph orders was replaced by electric tablets, later automatic tablet exchange systems were used. The 11-mile (18 km) climb out of Inverness was doubled in 1898, and 23 1/4 miles (37.4 km) of line widened over the Grampians between 1901 and 1909. Snow could close the line for days during the winter, and snow fences were erected beside the railway. The Highland had three types of snow plough; a small one that was fitted to locomotives, now capable of hauling trains through 2 feet (0.61 m) drifts. If the snow was less than 5 feet (1.5 m) deep, a pilot engine with a larger plough would precede the train. An even larger plough could be used with three or four locomotives coupled together. Dava Moor and the cuttings near Druimuachdar summit were troublesome, although the line over the summit improved after it had been doubled.

==== Invergarry and Fort Augustus ====
The Great Glen is a natural route that runs south west from Inverness to Fort William and is used by the Caledonian Canal, and more recently the A82 road. In 1884, the Glasgow and North Western Railway proposed a line from the North British Railway's station at Maryhill, in Glasgow's northern suburbs, to Fort William, and extending this through the Great Glen to Inverness. Backed by the North British Railway, this would have reduced the distance by rail between Glasgow and Inverness from 207 miles (333 km) to 160 miles (260 km). The Highland, concerned about competition from a shorter route, argued that there was insufficient traffic travelling south from Inverness for two lines, and the proposal was rejected by Parliament. The Highland opposed again when the West Highland Railway later applied for a line from Glasgow to Fort William and Spean Bridge, but permission was given in 1889 and the line opened in 1894. Lines from Spean Bridge to Inverness were proposed by both the Highland and West Highland Railways in 1893 but after negotiation, both companies agreed to withdraw their bills. In 1895 the West Highland proposed building a line from Fort William to Mallaig, the Highland objecting as it would compete with their line to Strome Ferry and its planned extension to Kyle of Lochalsh on journeys to Skye. Permission was given and the North British and West Highland Railways both agreed not to sponsor any line through the Great Glen for ten years. The Invergarry and Fort Augustus Railway was a local company and despite opposition, received permission in the Invergarry and Fort Augustus Railway Act 1896 (59 & 60 Vict. c. ccxl) for a 24-mile (39 km) long line along the Great Glen from Spean Bridge to Fort Augustus, 30 miles (48 km) from Inverness. Three proposals, from the Highland, the West Highland and the Invergarry & Fort Augustus Railway, to extend this railway to Inverness were presented to Parliament the following year, and all failed after costly litigation. After costly construction the line was complete in 1901, but with no money left to buy rolling stock, the company offered the line to the North British, who was running services through Spean Bridge station. The company proposed running services at cost, but a request for guarantees was refused and the line offered to the Highland Railway. After fresh battles in Parliament, and both the Highland and North British Railways guaranteeing that they would not seek to extend the line, the Highland Railway was given permission to operate services on the line for a payment of £4,000 a year.

Services started on 22 July 1903. During the summer some services ran beyond Fort Augustus to a pier on Loch Ness to connect with a steamer, but this was withdrawn in 1906. In 1907 the Highland withdrew and the North British took over until services were suspended between 31 October 1911 and 1 August 1913, and the North British bought the line for £27,000 in 1914. The line became part of the London and North Eastern Railway after the grouping. Passenger services were withdrawn on 1 December 1933, after which a coal train ran on Saturdays until the line closed completely on 1 January 1947.

=== 20th century ===
To serve the county town of Dornoch a 7 3/4-mile (12.5 km) Light Railway was built from The Mound by an independent company and operated by the Highland Railway, services starting on 2 June 1902. Another Light Railway, approved in 1899, ran 13 3/4 miles (22.1 km) south from Wick to Lybster, was supported by a Treasury grant of £25,000. This line opened on 1903, worked by the Highland at cost price, and Lybster harbour was improved by the Duke of Portland. Following negotiations, amalgamation of the Highland and the Great North of Scotland Railways was accepted by the Great North shareholders in early 1906, but the Highland board withdrew after opposition from a minority of their shareholders. The Aberdeen and Inverness trains were jointly worked after 1908 and locomotives were no longer exchanged at Keith or Elgin; between 1914 and 1916 the Highland paid the GNoSR to provide locomotives for all of the services through to Inverness. Sunday services were withdrawn in 1920 after the Postmaster General withdrew deliveries of letters on a Sunday.

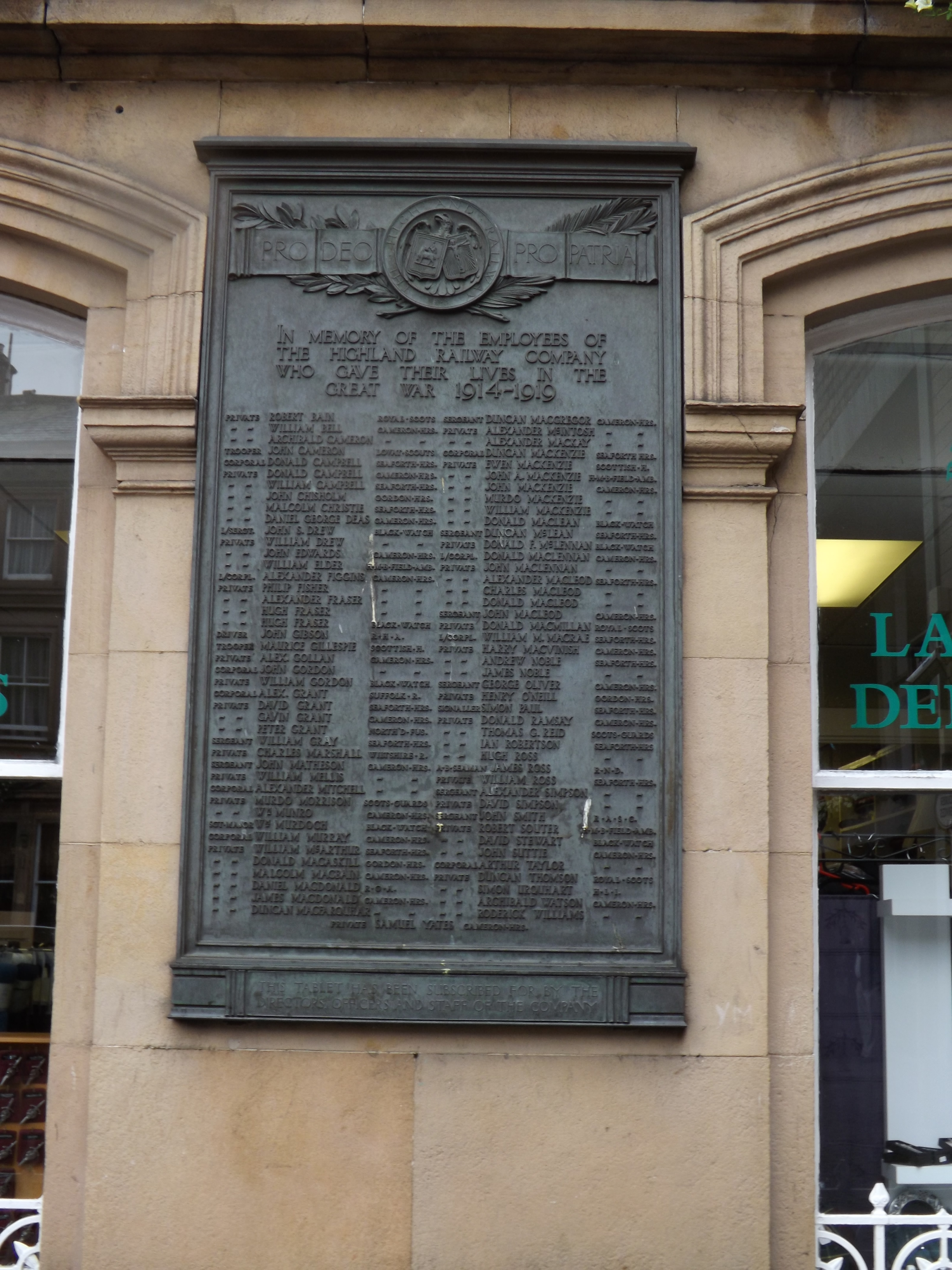
Memorial at Inverness to men of the Highland Railway who gave their lives in the First World War

Britain declared war on Germany on 4 August 1914 and the government took control of the railways under the Regulation of the Forces Act 1871. Day-to-day operations were left in the control of local management, but movements necessary for the war were coordinated by a committee of general managers. The Navy established a base at Scapa Flow, in Orkney, and this was serviced from Scrabster Harbour, 2 miles (3.2 km) from the Highland station at Thurso. A repair base for shipping was built at Invergordon, including housing for 4000 workers. Defence works at Scapa Flow and Invergordon required large amounts of timber at the same time the demand from the south for pit-timber increased; by 1918 the Highland was transporting ten times the amount of timber it had shipped before the war. Coal, which before the war was carried by coastal steamers, now had to be shipped by rail. To cope with the irregular flow of officers and men to and from London a special train was arranged between London and Thurso. (Note: The service was named the Jellicoe Express after Admiral Jellicoe, commander of the British Grand Fleet.) This ran between 1917 and 1919, leaving London Euston at 6 pm (3 pm in the winter) to arrive in Thurso 21 1/2 hours later; the return journey left at 11:45 am and took 22 1/3 hours. The train was composed of 14 carriages of corridor stock, policed by a travelling master-at-arms; officers were given sleeping accommodation. The train stopped for 30 minutes at Inverness so a meal could be provided by the station hotel; some days nearly 1,000 meals were provided.

The line between Keith to Highland's Buckie station closed in 1915 and only goods traffic used the line from Buckie to Portessie. Locomotive repairs fell behind because of the excessive demands and many of the engine fitters had been called up for war service. Twenty locomotives were loaned from other railways; efforts to get engine fitters failed. 756 of the 3,000 Highland Railway staff served active service and a memorial to 87 that died was placed in Station Square at Inverness. The railways were in a poor state after the war, costs having increased, with higher wages, the introduction of an eight-hour day and the price of coal having risen. A scheme was devised whereby the railways would be grouped into four large companies; this was approved by Parliament as the Railways Act 1921.

=== Grouping and nationalisation ===
On 1 January 1923 the Highland Railway became a part of the London, Midland and Scottish Railway (LMS), passing on 494 miles (795 km) of line. Refreshment carriages were introduced on services from summer 1923, but competition from bus services meant services were withdrawn from the Burghead and Fochabers branches in 1931. Sunday services were restored in 1929 with a train in each direction between Perth and Inverness via Forres. Third Class sleeping berths between London and Scotland were available from 1928, although the Glasgow to Inverness remained first class only until 1932. From 1936 it was possible to travel from London to Inverness by day, albeit with changes at Edinburgh and Perth. The railways were again placed under government control on 1 September 1939, and Britain was at war two days later.

Britain's railways were nationalised on 1 January 1948 and the former Highland Railway lines were placed under the control of the Scottish Region of British Railways.

The 1955 Modernisation Plan, known formally as the "Modernisation and Re-Equipment of the British Railways", was published in December 1954, and with the aim of increasing speed and reliability the steam trains were replaced with electric and diesel traction. Diesel locomotives replaced steam locomotives from 1958. Diesel multiple units were used on local services between Perth and Blair Atholl and from 1960 cross-country units were used on an accelerated Aberdeen to Inverness service that allowed 2 1/2 hours for four stops. Most of the steam locomotives had been withdrawn by June 1961.

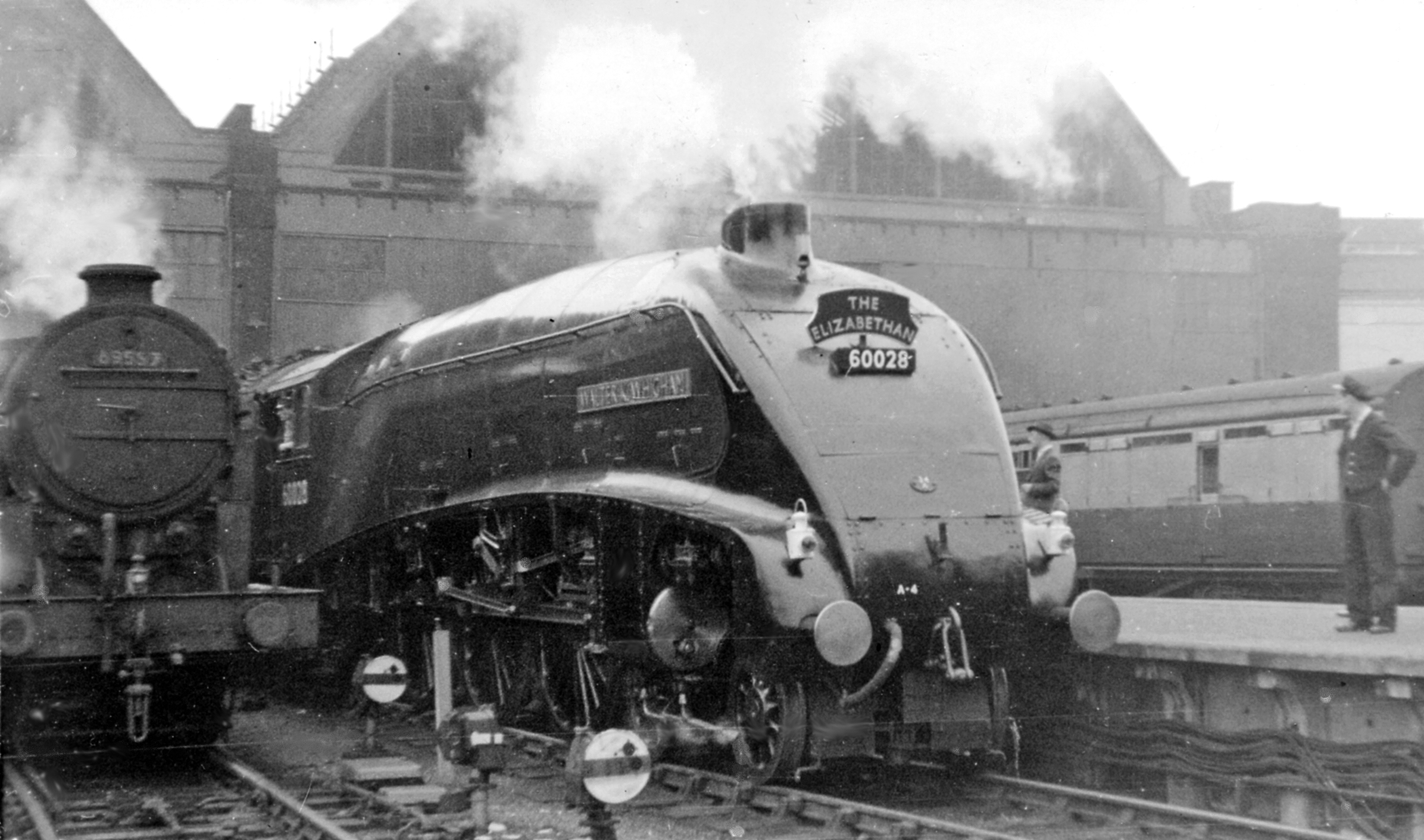
The Elizabethan non-stop London to Edinburgh train, here before its inaugural run in 1953

The branches from Muir of Ord to Fortrose closed in 1951 and the Dornoch Light Railway in 1960 as a result of competition from road transport. The former junction station at Stanley closed in 1956. In 1960 twenty stations closed on the line to Wick and Thurso, resulting in significant time savings. The line was diverted on the Kyle of Lochalsh Line in 1954 to allow the level of Loch Luichart to be raised for a hydro-electric project.

In 1963 Dr Beeching published his report "The Reshaping of British Railways", which recommended closing the network's least used stations and lines. This recommended closing all the former lines except those to Perth and Keith. Local trains were withdrawn between Elgin and Keith in 1964, the Aberfeldy branch and the line between Aviemore and Forres closed in 1965 but the lines to the north of Inverness remain. The goods service at individual stations was also withdrawn after Beeching's report.

In the 1969 timetable there were early morning trains between Aberdeen and Inverurie, and five services a day between Aberdeen to Inverness, supplemented by two Aberdeen to Elgin services that by the late 1970s were running through to Inverness. In 1962 the Elizabethan's six-hour schedule between London and Edinburgh meant a 9:30 am London departure gave a 9:30 pm arrival at Inverness, with 33 minutes allowed for changing trains at Edinburgh, and a through daytime service from Inverness to London via Perth started in 1974 with the Clansman, and this was replaced in 1984 by the Highland Chieftain with a schedule of about 8 3/4 hours.

=== Legacy ===
Currently, the Highland Railway's main lines out of Inverness are used by ScotRail services to Perth, Keith, Kyle of Lochalsh, and Wick and Thurso. The line south to Perth is single track, apart from double track for a few miles out of Inverness and between Dalwhinnie and Blair Atholl. There are eleven services a day to Perth that continue onto either Glasgow or Edinburgh. The daily Highland Chieftain service from London King's Cross still runs, taking about eight hours for the journey and the Caledonian Sleeper operates between London Euston to Inverness on six nights a week.

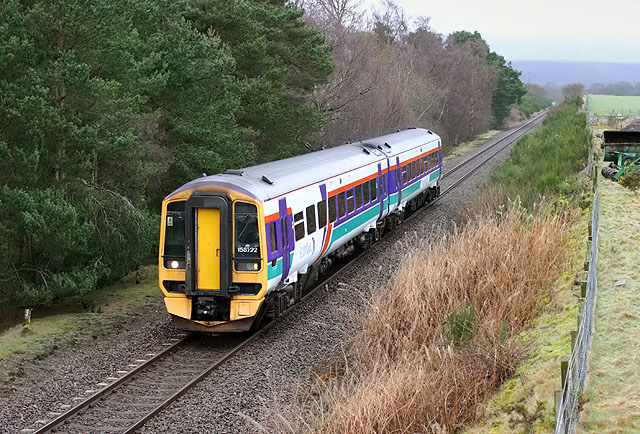
Train near Muir of Ord on the Far North Line

The Aberdeen to Inverness Line currently uses the line to Keith with stations at Nairn, Forres and Elgin. Eleven trains a day run between Aberdeen and Inverness, taking about 2 1/4 hours, supplemented by a couple of early morning trains from Elgin to Inverness. There are plans for a regular hourly Aberdeen to Inverness service with additional hourly trains between Inverness and Elgin and a new station at Dalcross, and Network Rail are evaluating what line upgrades are necessary. The Far North Line is served by four trains a day from Inverness to Wick, via Thurso, (Note: The train reverses at Georgemas Junction to travel to Thurso before reversing again, calling at Georgemas Junction a second time before terminating at Wick.) taking about 4 1/4 hours, supplemented by four services to Invergordon, Tain or Ardgay. The Kyle Line is served by four trains a day from Inverness that take about 2 1/2 hours.

The Heritage Strathspey Railway operates seasonal services over the former Highland Railway route from Aviemore to Grantown-on-Spey via the joint Highland and GNoSR Boat of Garten station. The Dava Way is a long-distance path that mostly follows the route of the former Highland railway line between Grantown and Forres.

== Accidents and incidents ==
- On 21 October 1865 there was a collision at Pitlochry railway station when an Inverness to Perth passenger train was unable to stop when signaled to do so, it ran into a mixed train heading north from Perth as it was entering a loop. Nine passengers were injured, none seriously.
- On 7 February 1884 there was an accident at Kildonan railway station. A special fish train from Wick approached the station when it derailed and ploughed up several hundred yards of track. The fireman, Alexander Campbell of Wick, died and the engine driver, David Mathieson of Wick was badly injured.
- On 29 April 1891 there was a collision at Helmsdale railway station between a down mixed train from Inverness which ran into an engine which had arrived earlier. Major Marindin of the Board of Trade investigated and found that the driver Robert Lindsay deliberately ignored the signals as he would have had difficulty in restarting the train on the rising gradient of 1 in 59.
- On 15 June 1915, a bridge over the Baddengorm Burn at Carrbridge, Inverness-shire collapsed in a storm when débris from another bridge upstream was swept into it. A passenger train ran onto it and was derailed. Five people were killed.

== Rolling stock ==
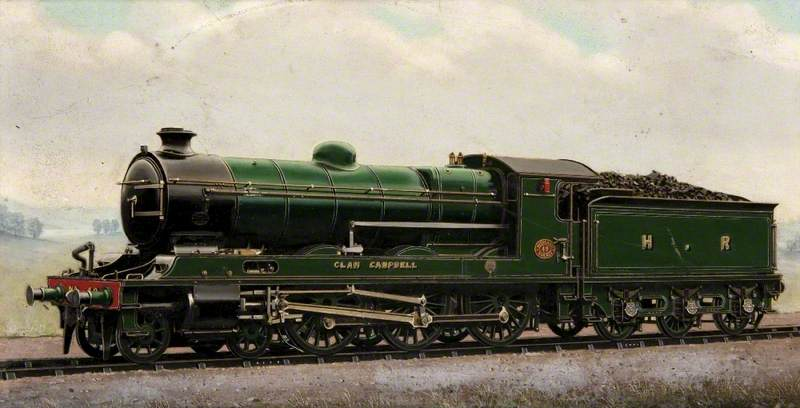
Highland Railway locomotive No. 49, 'Clan Campbell'

=== Locomotives ===
==== Early designs ====
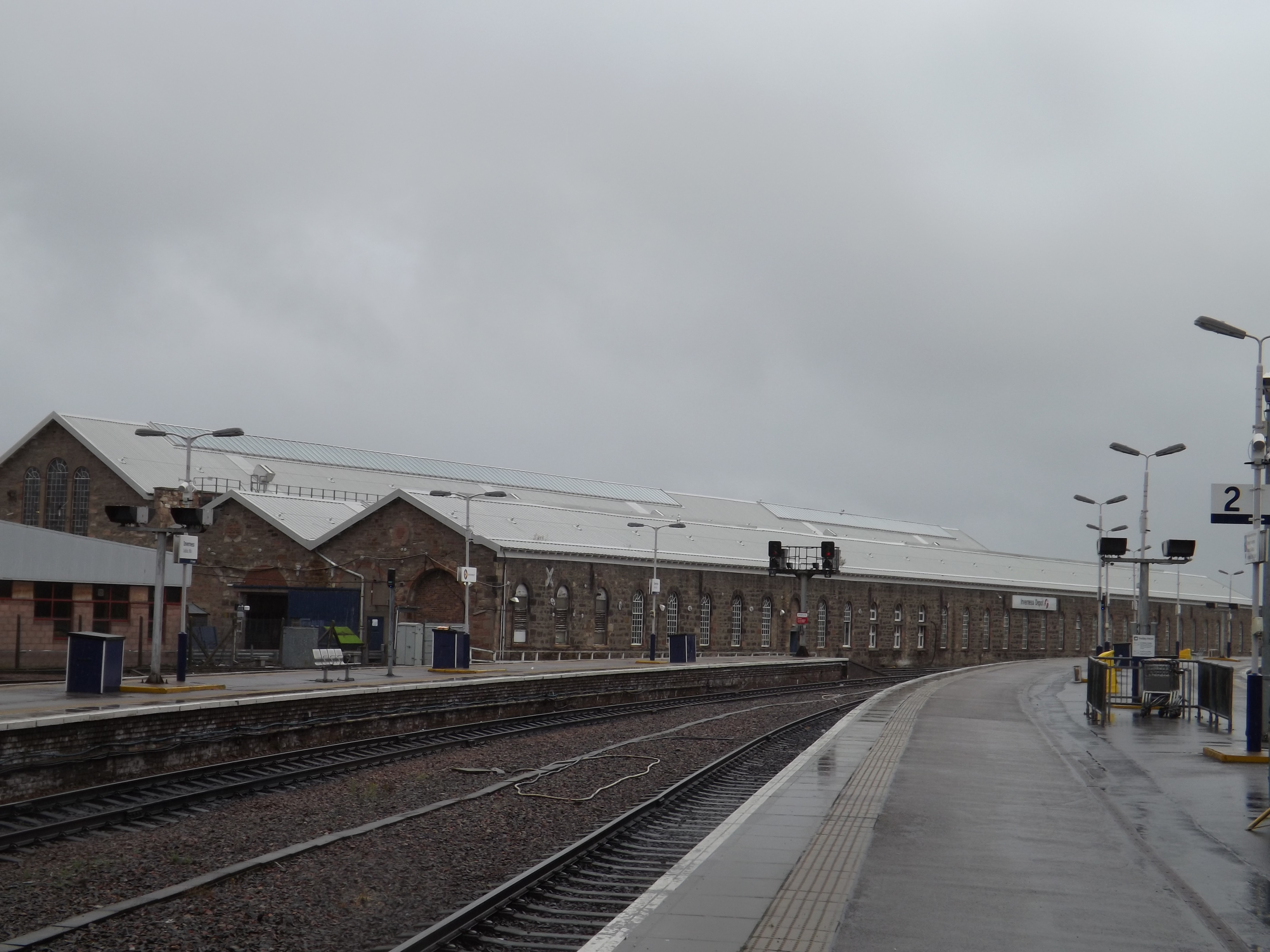
Highland Railway locomotive works at Lochgorm, built c. 1860 and now a Category B listed building.

When the Highland Railway was created in 1865 it acquired the locomotives of its constituent companies, nearly all of which had been built under the supervision of William Barclay. In these early years locomotives were painted a dark green with numbers on the buffer beam.

The Inverness & Nairn opened in 1855 with two 2-2-2 locomotives with four wheeled tenders, built by Hawthorns of Leith, with a weather board to protect the engine men. Two more were bought by the Inverness & Aberdeen Junction in 1857 and another two were built in 1862, with cabs, by Hawthorns for the Inverness & Ross-shire Railway. These early locomotives had all been scrapped by 1901. Between 1862 and 1864 another eighteen were delivered, slightly larger and with six-wheel tenders; the last sixteen built by Neilson & Co. The majority of these were converted into 2-4-0s between 1869 and 1892 and one, No. 35, lasted until 1923.

Seven goods locomotives, 2-4-0 with four-wheeled tenders, had been built in 1858–59 by Hawthorns, and these were followed in 1862 by two more, slightly larger and with cabs. Two batches of ten 2-4-0 goods locomotives were built in 1863–64 by Sharp, Stewart & Co. These were slightly larger than the previous locomotives; the later ten of them had a longer wheelbase than the previous ten. Three locomotives survived until 1923. The Highland also took over the Findhorn Railway's small 0-4-0 tank engine that had been built by Neilson and the 0-4-0 tank engine that had been bought for the Hopeman branch from Hawthorns.

Barclay resigned in 1865, the year in which Highland Railway was formed, and William Stroudley became the first locomotive supervisor of the new company. The Inverness & Nairn had built a locomotive works at Lochgorm in 1855, just outside Inverness station, and that became the site of the Highland's works. Later, carriage shops were built alongside. Stroudley designed a 0-6-0 saddle tank and three were built at these works between 1869 and 1874. In 1869 he left to join the London, Brighton & South Coast Railway, where more of these locomotives were built, and the class became known as the Terriers. Stroundley painted passenger locomotives yellow with crimson framing and goods locomotives a dark green, and number plates were introduced.

==== Jones ====
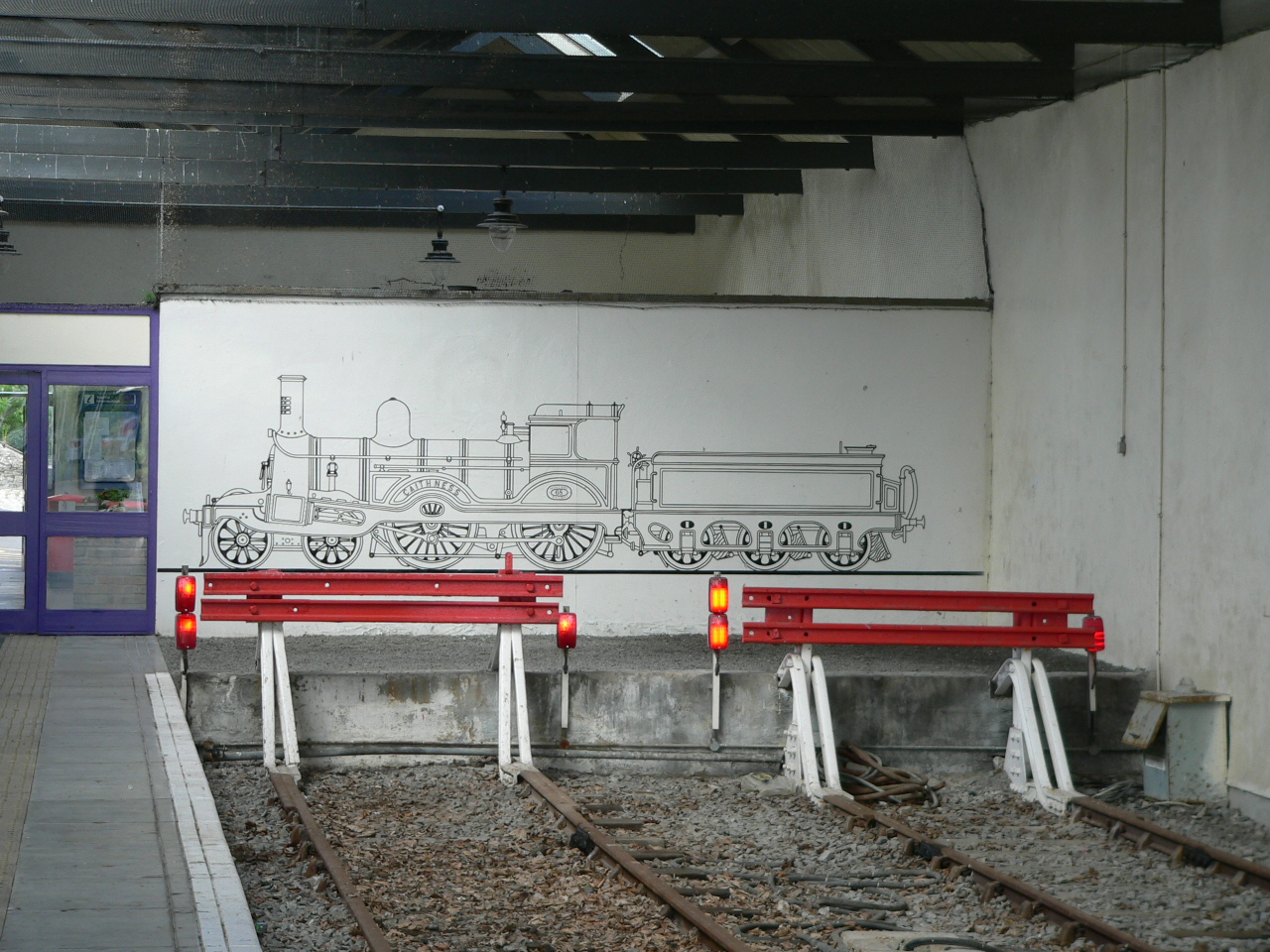
Line drawing of No. 68 Caithness, designed by Jones in 1874, at Thurso station

David Jones had worked at Lochgorm since 1855, where he had moved at the age of 21 after serving his apprenticeship with the London & North Western Railway. He became locomotive supervisor in 1870. His first design was a 4-4-0 passenger locomotive, with the double chimney that became standard on his Highland Railway locomotives. Ten were built by Dübs & Co. in 1874, and between 1878 and 1888 another seven were built by the Highland at Lochgorm. The tenders had six wheels, but considered small. All were still in service in 1907, but in 1923 only five had survived.

Two 2-4-0 passenger locomotives were built at Lochgram in 1877, followed by three 2-4-0 tank engines in 1878/9 for shunting and branch line duties. The tank engines were rapidly converted to 4-4-0s after problems with the leading axle. After two of the earlier 2-4-0 locomotives had been successfully converted into 4-4-0 for the Dingwall & Skye Railway, nine of the 4-4-0 'Skye Bogie' Class were built between 1882 and 1901. Eight 4-4-0 tender locomotives for main line services were built in 1886 by Clyde Locomotive Co., and a small 0-4-4 saddletank was built at Lochgorm for the Strathpeffer branch in 1890. The 'Strath' Class followed, twelve 4-4-0 locomotives built by Neilson in 1892 for the main-line, to an enlarged form of Jones' standard design. In 1892, Dübs & Co. sold the Highland two 4-4-0 tank engines that had been built for the Uruguay Eastern Railway but not delivered. These were followed by three more in the following year, and these locomotives were used on branch lines.

In 1894 Jones introduced his 4-6-0 goods locomotives, the first with this wheel arrangement on British railways. Fifteen locomotives were built by Sharp, Steward & Co., and ran with six-wheeled tenders. One of these, No. 103, is a static exhibit at the Riverside Museum in Glasgow. Fifteen large 4-4-0s, the 'Loch' Class, arrived from Dübs & Co. in 1896, and these had identical tenders to the goods locomotives.

The Duke of Sutherland purchased a small 2-4-0 tank locomotive, named Dunrobin, and after the Highland began providing services this was reserved for the Duke's private carriage. After the Duke died in 1892 his son, the 4th Duke of Sutherland, purchased a Jones designed 0-4-4 tank from Sharp, Stewart & Co. that was provided with accommodation in the cab for the Duke's guests. Jones changed the livery of the goods locomotives to black lined with red and white. After 1885 all locomotives were painted a pea green with a darker border, lined with red and white. Number plates were retained.

==== Drummond ====
Jones retired in 1896, after an accident testing a locomotive. He was replaced by Peter Drummond, who had worked at LB&SCR, North British and Caledonian Railways before joining the Highland. The first locomotives designed by Drummond were the 'Small Bens' that closely followed locomotive design on the NBR and CR. A total of 20 were built by Dübs & Co., Highland Railway at Lochgorm and North British Loco Co. (Note: Sharp Stewart & Co, Dübs & Co. and Neilson amalgamated to form the North British Loco Co. in 1903.) in 1898–1901 and 1906, these were smaller than the Loch Class, and they normally worked on the line north to Wick and Thurso and east to Keith. Drummond designed a 0-6-0 goods locomotive, and twelve were built between 1900 and 1907 by Dübs & Co. and the North British Loco Co. These had boilers and cylinders interchangeable with the 'Small Bens'.

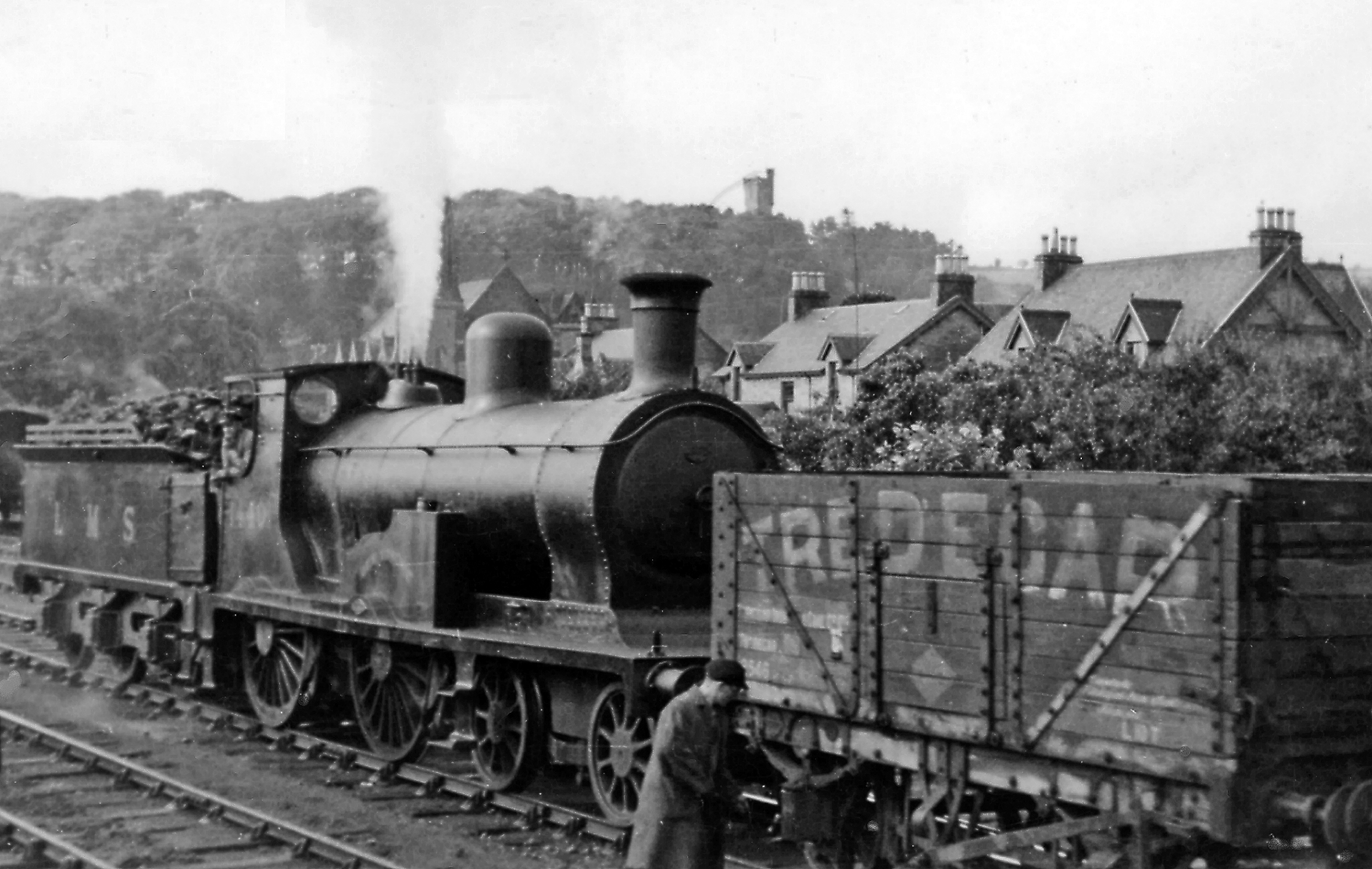
A 'Small Ben' 4-4-0, designed by Drummond

The 'Castle' Class were a powerful 4-6-0 passenger locomotive with large tenders that ran on two bogies. (Note: Also known as a truck, a bogie is a four or six wheeled module attached by a pivot to the underside of a vehicle.) From 1900 a total of twelve were built, the last two in 1910/11, and they worked between Perth and Inverness. One was fitted in 1912 with a Phoenix superheater, but this was later removed. Between 1903 and 1906 seven tank engines (Note: On a tank engine or tank locomotive the water is held in tanks near the boiler and small amount of coal is kept behind the footplate, rather than being held on a separate tender.) were built at Lochgorm, three 0-6-0s for shunting and four 0-4-4s for branch services. Six 'Big Bens' followed, similar to the 'Small Bens' but with slighter larger boilers. In 1909 and 1911 twelve 0-6-4 tank engines were built, designed for banking.

Drummond changed the locomotive livery soon after joining the company, removing the red lining, edging instead in white, and adding 'HR' on the tenders or tanks and front buffer beams. These initials became 'Highland Railway' in full on the Castle class. After 1903, the locomotives were painted a darker green with no lining and labeled, 'The Highland Railway' on the tenders or tanks. Drummond moved to the Glasgow & South Western Railway in 1912.

==== Later designs ====
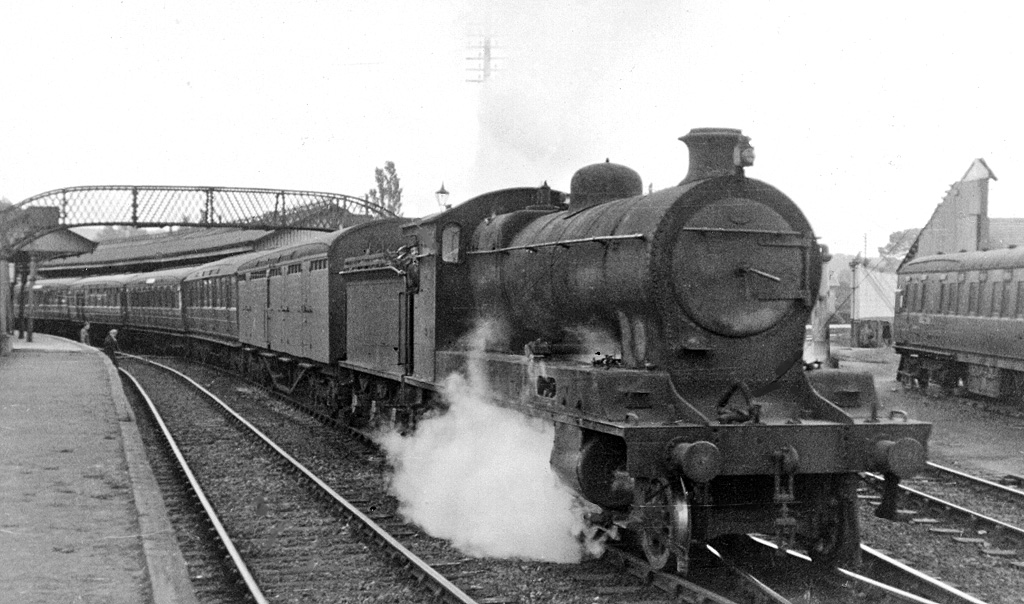
'Clan Goods', built in 1918–19, on an Aberdeen to Inverness express in 1948

Fredrick Smith followed as locomotive superintendent; he had been works manager for the Highland since 1903. Four more Castle Class locomotives were built by the North British in 1913, with modifications to the design of the smokebox and chimney. Smith designed the 'River' Class, large 4-6-0 tender locomotives, for working on the Perth main line, and six were ordered from Hawthorn, Leslie & Co. Two arrived in 1915, but as soon as they arrived the Chief Engineer condemned them as being too heavy for the Highland track. Smith resigned and the locomotives were sold to the Caledonian Railway. (Note: The River class worked between Perth and Inverness after grouping.)

Smith was replaced by Christopher Cumming, who had worked for the North British Railway. The demands of World War I meant a shortage of traction, and six locomotives were built to older designs, three 'Loch' Class and three 'Castle' Class, which arrived in 1917. Cumming designed a 4-4-0 tender locomotive, with Robinson superheaters, and two of these also arrived in 1917 to work the Far North Line. Eight 4-6-0 goods locomotives to a Cummings design, also with Robinson superheaters, arrived in 1918–19. The 'Clan' Class was designed for the Perth to Inverness route, 4-6-0 tender locomotives with superheaters and six wheel tenders and eight were built by Hawthorn, Leslie & Co, four in 1919 and four in 1921. Cummings resigned due to ill health early in 1922 and David Chalmers Urie was appointed successor. The Highland Railway ceased to exist on 31 December 1922, passing 173 locomotives to the London, Midland & Scottish Railway; twenty-three of these were withdrawn from traffic before being renumbered by the new company.

==== Locomotive depots ====
The principal locomotive depots on the Highland Railway were at Inverness, Perth, Blair Atholl, Forres and Aviemore, which in July 1919 had allocations of 59, 36, 12, 10 and 9 locomotives respectively. The remaining 35 locomotives were spread out among fifteen depots, most of which had only one or two locomotives each: Aberfeldy (1), Burghead (2), Dingwall (4), Dornoch (1), Fochabers (1), Fort George (none), Fortrose (1), Helmsdale (4), Keith (2), Kingussie (2), Kyle of Lochalsh (6), Lybster (2), Tain (2), Thurso (1) and Wick (6). In January 1935, by which time Fochabers and Kingussie had closed, the LMS reorganised its motive power depot structure, and codes were allocated to the depots as follows:

LMS (ex-Highland) motive power depots, 1935
Code	Depot	Sub-sheds
29A	Perth	Aberfeldy, Blair Atholl
29H	Inverness	Dingwall, Dornoch, Fort George, Fortrose, Helmsdale, Kyle of Lochalsh, Lybster, Tain, Thurso, Wick
29J	Aviemore	
29K	Forres	Burghead, Keith

By September 1935, several depots (such as Blair Atholl and Kyle of Lochalsh) had their allocations reduced, but Fort George now had one locomotive allocated. The HR depot at Perth, latterly known as Perth North, closed in 1938 with its locomotives being transferred to Perth South, the former Caledonian depot.

=== Carriages ===
The first carriages used by the Inverness & Nairn Railway were of the short four-wheeled type and had accommodation for first and third class. A mail van made in 1858 for the Inverness to Keith route survived until 1903; this was 20 feet 10 inches (6.35 m) long, and fitted with Newall's chain brake. Luggage was carried on the roof, behind a railing, where there was also a seat for the guard, and dogs were placed in a boot. Later carriages did not have the seat for the guard and space for luggage on the roof. Longer carriages were ordered for the line to Wick, 27 feet 6 inches (8.38 m) long, and these seated 50 passengers in third class. Six-wheeled carriages were introduced in the late 1870s, the first class seating sixteen passenger with access to toilets and the third class seating fifty passengers; these were still lit by oil lamps. Second class accommodation was available after the direct line to Perth opened, but this was not popular as it offering little extra comfort over third class, and was abolished in 1893. A six-wheeled carriage built at Lochgram in 1909 has been preserved by the Scottish Railway Preservation Society.

The first eight-wheeled carriages were three first class sleeping carriages. These accommodated nine passengers, in two single berth compartments and two larger compartments, one for ladies and one for gentlemen. Between 1885 and 1907 the Pullman Car Company provided two specially designed carriages, each sleeping sixteen. A travelling attendant was provided by Pullman and the supplementary fare for a berth was 5s. Carriages from other railways was conveyed on the main line from Perth.

After Drummond became locomotive supervisor at Lochgorm in 1896 the older carriages were replaced by bogie stock that had access to a toilet from both third and first class accommodation, gas lighting and steam heating. Passenger carriages had previously been green with yellow lining, but Drummond painted the upper sides white. The livery reverted to green in 1903, although the sleeping carriages that which replaced the Pullmans and main-line excursion trains were built in varnished teak. Drummond's designs continued to be built until grouping, later carriages included vestibules and electric lighting.

== Principal office bearers ==
Chairmen

1865–1884 Sir Alexander Matheson

1885–1891 Thomas Charles Bruce

1892–1896 Aeneas William Mackintosh

1897–1900 George Macpherson Grant

1901 James Douglas Fletcher

1902–1912 William Whitelaw

1913–1915 R.M. Wilson

1916 William Whitelaw

1917–1922 W.H. Cox

Secretaries

1865–1896 Andrew Dougall

1897–1898 Charles Steel

1899–1910 Thomas Wilson

1911–1922 Robert Park

General Managers

1865–1896 Andrew Dougall (Note: Andrew Dougall had also been the founding General Manager of the I&NR, I&AJR, I&PJR and I&RSR.)

1897–1901 Charles Steel

1902–1910 Robert Park

1911–1922 George Cornet

Locomotive Superintendents

1865–1869 William Stroudley

1870–1896 David Jones

1897–1911 Peter Drummond

1912–1915 Fredrick George Smith

1915–1922 Christopher Cumming

1915–1922 David Chalmers Urie

Engineers

1865–1869 J.W. Buttle (Note: Superintendent of permanent way)

1870–1874 Peter Wilson (Note: Resident engineer)

1874–1898 Murdoch Paterson (Note: Resident engineer until 1893, then chief engineer)

1898–1913 William Roberts (Note: Engineer)

1914–1922 Alexander Newlands

== See also ==
- List of Highland Railway stations
- Henry John Wynne, signals engineer (c1890-1900)

== Notes and references ==
=== Books ===
- Butt, R. V. J. (1995). The Directory of Railway Stations: details every public and private passenger station, halt, platform and stopping place, past and present (1st ed.). Patrick Stephens Ltd. ISBN 1-85260-508-1.
- Barclay-Harvey, Malcolm (1998) [1950]. A History of the Great North of Scotland Railway (2nd ed.). Ian Allan. ISBN 978-0-7110-2592-9.
- Conolly, W. Philip (2004). British Railways Pre-Grouping Atlas and Gazetteer. Hersham: Ian Allan Publishing. ISBN 0-7110-0320-3.
- Cormack, J.R.H.; Stevenson, J.L. (1990). Greenwood, William (ed.). Highland Railway Locomotives Book 2: The Drummond, Smith & Cumming Classes. Locomotives of the LMS. Lincoln: RCTS. ISBN 0-901115-72-X.
- Jackson, Alan (1992). The Railway Dictionary: An A-Z of Railway Terminology. Sutton Publishing. ISBN 07509-00385.
- Pratt, Edwin A (1921). British Railways and the Great War; Organisation, Efforts, Difficulties and Achievements. Selwyn & Blount.
- Ross, David (2005). The Highland Railway. Stroud: Tempus. ISBN 9780752434797. OCLC 219967913.
- Vallance, H.A.; Clinker, C.R. (1971). The Highland Railway. Pan Macmillan. ISBN 978-0-330-02720-5.
- Vallance, H. A. (27 June 1991). Great North of Scotland railway. The History of the Railways of the Scottish Highlands vol 3. David St John Thomas. ISBN 978-0-946537-60-0.
- Whitehouse, Patrick; Thomas, David St John (1987). LMS 150: The London Midland and Scottish Railway - A Century and a Half of Progress. Newton Abbot: David & Charles. ISBN 0-7153-8740-5. 01LO49.
