= Inverness and Aberdeen Junction Railway =

Railway line between Inverness and Aberdeen, Scotland

Overview
- Locale: Scotland
- Dates of operation: 21 July 1856–1 February 1865
- Successor: Highland Railway

Technical
- Track gauge: 1,435 mm (4 ft 8 1/2 in)

The Inverness and Aberdeen Junction Railway (I&AJR) was a railway company in Scotland, created to connect other railways and complete the route between Inverness and Aberdeen. The Inverness and Nairn Railway had opened to the public on 7 November 1855 and the Great North of Scotland Railway (GNoSR) was building from Aberdeen to Keith. The I&AJR opened, closing the gap, on 18 August 1856.

It found the GNoSR a difficult partner and passenger journeys from Inverness to the south via Aberdeen were inconvenient and circuitous.

== Early intentions ==
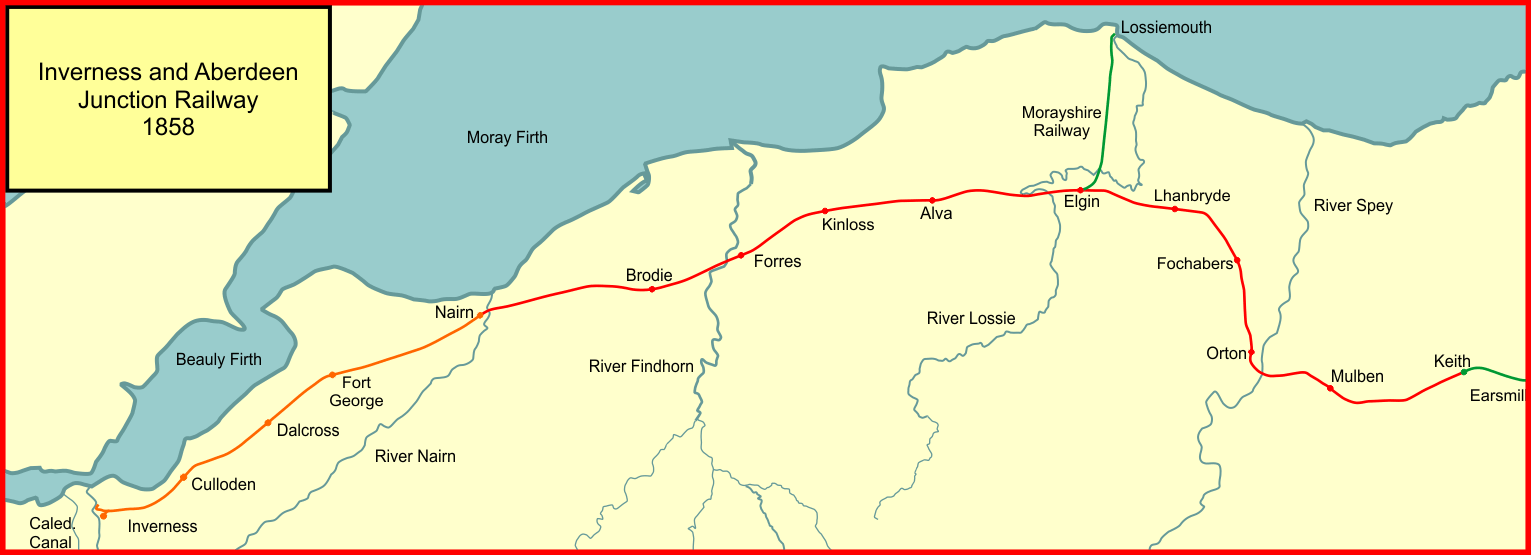
The Inverness and Aberdeen Junction Railway system in 1858

In the 1840s the Scottish railway network was taking shape, chiefly at first in Central Scotland. Connecting Aberdeen to the central area was feasible, and a line was completed to Aberdeen in 1850. The commercial and social advantages of a railway connection were by this time well-known, and a town or community that was not so connected was destined to decline. Accordingly, interests in Inverness sought their own railway connection.

The massive physical obstacle of the Monadhliath Mountains lies between Inverness and Perth, and the limited power of locomotives of the day ruled out any route that might have to climb over the mountain passes, so that a connection to Aberdeen seemed, for the time being, to be the only solution.

It was financial interests in Aberdeen who put forward a line from there to Inverness, and in 1846 the Great North of Scotland Railway (GNoSR) was given its authorising act of Parliament, the Great North of Scotland Railway Act 1846 (9 & 10 Vict. c. ciii). However this was for a line from Aberdeen to Huntly only. The GNoSR intended to extend on to Inverness later, when circumstances might be more favourable. However investors were reluctant to put money into the scheme, and of the £1.1 million of authorised capital, only £400,000 had been subscribed by 1852. Despite the deficient capital, the line was tentatively opened for traffic in 1854. Having taken stock, the GNoSR decided to extend as far as Keith, but no further.

== Inverness and Nairn Railway ==
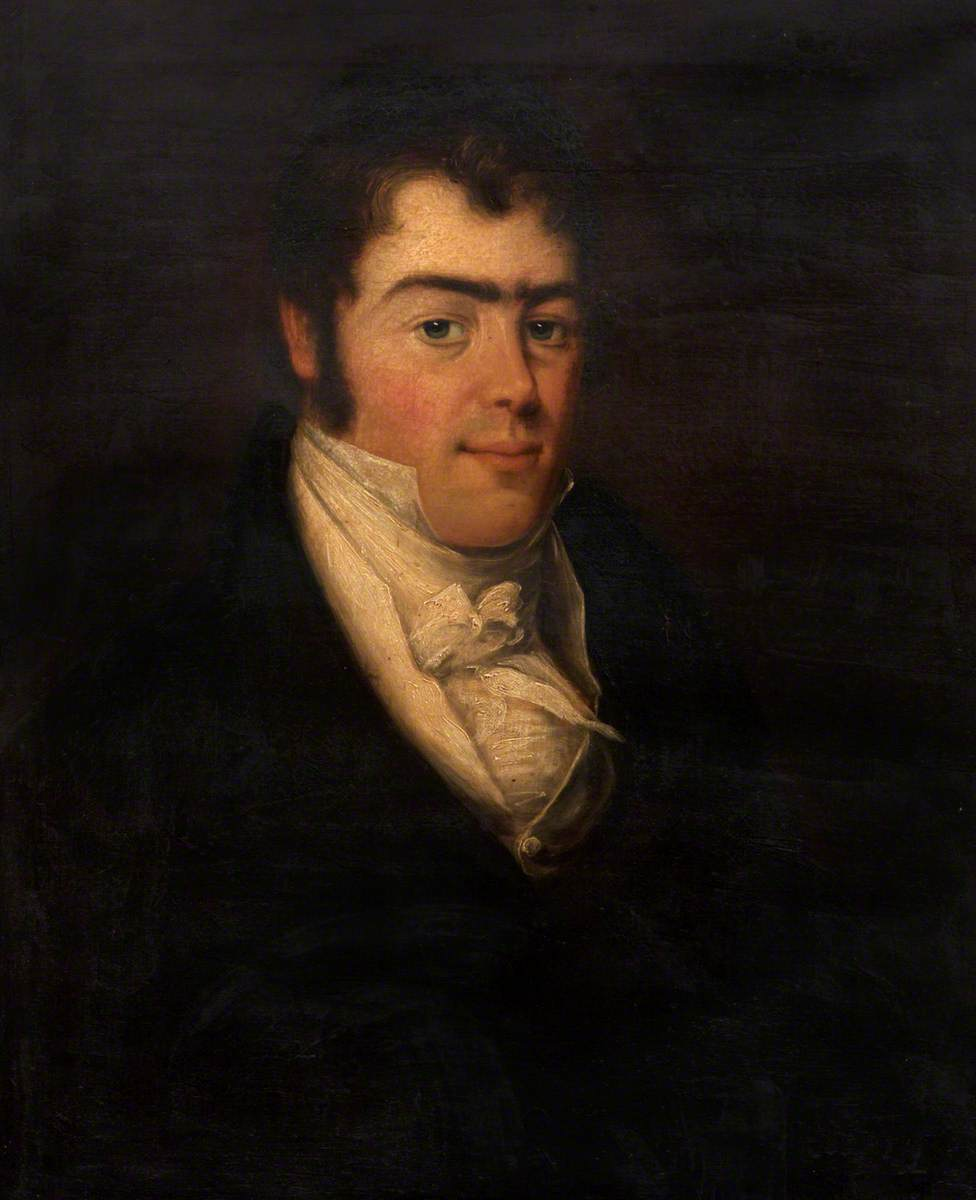
Joseph Mitchell

Commercial interests in Inverness were dismayed at this turn of events, but they were encouraged to consider that a railway connection was realistic by the engineer Joseph Mitchell, who persistently advocated the necessary construction. However it was clear that the huge financial outlay was not going to be available for some time, and he proposed a more modest scheme, the 15 miles to Nairn only. Mitchell was insistent that this was the first stage in a connection to the Central Scotland railway network. The project got its authorising act, the Inverness and Nairn Railway Act 1854 (17 & 18 Vict. c. clxxvi), on 24 July 1854. The line opened for traffic on 7 November 1855.

== Nairn to Keith: Inverness and Aberdeen Junction Railway ==
While the Inverness and Nairn Railway was under construction, Joseph Mitchell set about fostering the formation of a company to close the gap between Nairn and Huntly. He encouraged the Great North of Scotland Railway (GNoSR) to engage financially in a new company, called the Inverness and Elgin Junction Railway. However the Great North of Scotland Railway Company began to see that its heavy financial commitment would not be rewarded, and it decided instead to build independently as far as Keith. This would now leave a gap between Nairn and Keith, and Mitchell contrived to divert the Inverness and Elgin Junction to continue to Keith.

In 1854 proposals had been put forward for a line from Nairn to Huntly, jointly built, the GNoSR and the I&AJR building their own half of the line, and meeting at the crossing of the River Spey near Rothes. In fact the GNoSR put a number of obstacles in the way of this scheme, chiefly because of their own inability to fund the railway, and it did not proceed.

After some discussion, a new prospectus was issued in Inverness, and the name of the concern was now to be the Inverness and Aberdeen Junction Railway; the first meeting was held on 21 August 1855. The capital was to be £300,000 in £10 shares, and the GNoSR was invited to invest £50,000 and have two seats on the board of the new company. The Inverness group also undertook in a letter that they would abide by the agreement with the Great North for running powers all the way to Inverness.

Inverness and Aberdeen Junction Railway Act 1856
- Act of Parliament
- Parliament of the United Kingdom
- Long title: An Act for making a Railway from the Town of Nairn to the Town of Keith.
- Citation: 19 & 20 Vict. c. cx

Dates
- Royal assent: 21 July 1856

Other legislation
- Repealed by: Inverness and Aberdeen Junction Railway Act 1860

Status: Repealed

Text of statute as originally enacted

Inverness and Aberdeen Junction Railway Act 1860
- Act of Parliament
- Parliament of the United Kingdom
- Long title: An Act to amend the Inverness and Aberdeen Junction Railway Act, 1856; to enable the Inverness and Aberdeen Junction Railway Company to raise further Sums of Money; and for other Purposes.
- Citation: 23 & 24 Vict. c. ix

Dates
- Royal assent: 3 April 1860

Other legislation
- Repeals/revokes: Inverness and Aberdeen Junction Railway Act 1856
- Repealed by: Highland Railway Act 1865

Status: Repealed

Text of statute as originally enacted

In the face of considerable local prevarication, the I&AJR got its authorising act of Parliament, the Inverness and Aberdeen Junction Railway Act 1856 (19 & 20 Vict. c. cx), on 21 July 1856. Share capital was £325,000. Agreement with the Inverness and Nairn Railway to take over their line was finalised on 17 March 1857.

The first part of the construction was rapid, and on 22 December 1857 (Note: Thomas gives September on page 169, but December in the table on page 316.) a section was opened from Nairn to Dalvey. Dalvey was on the approach to Forres, but on the west side of the River Findhorn; the bridging of the river was a major engineering work. That was accomplished and the railway opened as far as Elgin on 25 or 28 (Ross) March 1858, and the line was complete and opened to Keith on 18 August 1858. The Great North Company had opened its line from the east to Keith on 11 October 1856. The Inverness and Aberdeen Junction Railway Company took over the working of the Inverness and Nairn Railway, but that company retained its independent existence until amalgamation on 17 May 1861.

There were no through trains between Inverness and Aberdeen: passengers changed at Keith. There were four trains daily on the I&AJR, of which three made the necessary connection.

== Running powers and co-operation ==
So Inverness now had its through connection to Aberdeen, to Central Scotland, and to England. This communication channel relied on co-operation between the Inverness and Aberdeen Junction Railway and the Great North of Scotland Railway. But the GNoSR was described as "Bristling with fight and notoriously cantankerous." The GNoSR had understood that it would have running powers throughout to Inverness, but now these were refused, leading to friction between the two companies. In addition there was personal animosity between the respective general managers.

Moreover, the GNoSR failed to make friends with the Aberdeen Railway at Aberdeen; for many years the two companies had separate stations there. Passengers from Inverness to the south needed to get between the stations, and the Aberdeen Railway trains departed on time, irrespective of a delayed arrival at the other station by the Great North train.

== A direct route to Perth ==
Inverness and Aberdeen Junction Railway Act 1861
- Act of Parliament
- Parliament of the United Kingdom
- Long title: An Act to authorize the Consolidation into One Undertaking of the Inverness and Nairn and Inverness and Aberdeen Junction Railways, and the Union into One Company of the Two Companies to which the said Railways respectively belong.
- Citation: 24 & 25 Vict. c. viii

Dates
- Royal assent: 17 May 1861

Other legislation
- Repealed by: Highland Railway Act 1865

Status: Repealed

Interests in Inverness had long harboured the intention of getting a direct route to Perth and the South; they were encouraged by the engineer Joseph Mitchell. The Inverness and Nairn Railway had always been seen as a first step towards that. Now on 22 July 1861 an act of Parliament, the Inverness and Aberdeen Junction Railway Act 1861 (24 & 25 Vict. c. viii), was passed for the Inverness and Perth Junction Railway. The starting point for its southward path would be Forres, not Nairn, in order better to serve the important fishing communities further east. It was to run to Dunkeld and adopt the Perth and Dunkeld Railway route there to Stanley, there joining the Scottish North Eastern Railway for the final run into Perth. The Perth and Dunkeld Railway was taken over on 28 February 1864.

Operationally the route was to be challenging, with a high summit at Dava, 1,052 feet (321 m) above sea level and another at Druimuachdar at 1,484 feet (452 m). However, despite the mountainous terrain, the engineering proved to be remarkably benign; only two large masonry viaducts and two short tunnels were needed, although a total of 245 underbridges were required. The terrain was very thinly populated. The line opened from Forres to Perth via Aviemore in 1863. Trains using the new route from Inverness ran over the I&AJR line as far as Forres.

A new station layout was provided at Forres. Hitherto the route had run straight through, but now a new triangular track layout was constructed on the south side, the original main line becoming goods by-pass lines. Passenger platforms were provided on all three double-track chords of the new triangle.

== Formation of the Highland Railway ==
The Inverness and Aberdeen Junction Railway and the Inverness and Perth Junction Railway amalgamated on 1 February 1865, and on 29 June 1865 a change of name was authorised by the Highland Railway Act 1865 (28 & 29 Vict. c. clxviii): the enlarged company was to be called the Highland Railway Company.

== Inverness and Aviemore direct ==
A direct line was constructed by the Highland Railway, opening in stages, but throughout on 1 November 1898.

The majority, but not all, of the southward traffic was diverted over the new direct line, not travelling over the I&AJR route at all, except for a short distance of the former Nairn Railway at Inverness.

== Later relations with the Great North of Scotland Railway ==
The uneasy relations at Aberdeen eased towards the end of the 19th century, to such an extent that by 1905 an amalgamation was proposed. It was however turned down by Highland Railway shareholders. In 1908 trains ran through between Aberdeen and Inverness without change of locomotive for the first time.

== Findhorn Railway ==
When the line between Elgin and Keith was opened in August 1858, its route ran inland, away from the coast, between Elgin and Nairn, and many small coastal settlements were remote from the new railway.

Findhorn Railway Act 1859
- Act of Parliament
- Parliament of the United Kingdom
- Long title: An Act for making a Railway from the Inverness and Aberdeen Junction Railway at or near Kinloss to Findhorn.
- Citation: 22 Vict. c. viii

Dates
- Royal assent: 19 April 1859

Local interests in Findhorn, finding themselves rather isolated between Findhorn Bay and the open waters of Burghead Bay, promoted a branch line, and this received authorising powers in the Findhorn Railway Act 1859 (22 Vict. c. viii) on 19 April 1859, incorporating the Findhorn Railway with capital of £9,000. The terrain was easy, mostly running on sand, and a three-mile line was designed, making a junction a short distance east of Kinloss station on the I&AJR main line. Joseph Mitchell was the engineer and Charles Brand of Montrose was the contractor.

The line was inspected by Captain Tyler of the Board of Trade on 9 April 1860 but because of a delay in furnishing signal posts at Kinloss Junction, the opening was delayed. The line opened on 18 April 1860 and trains were worked by the company itself, although rolling stock may have been hired from the larger company. The wooden station building of Kinloss was relocated so as to be at the point of junction of the Findhorn line, a distance of about 300 yards. The company had one locomotive, an 0-4-0 saddle tank built by Neilson and Company of Glasgow in 1860.

Once opened, the company immediately found that available traffic did not cover basic operating expenses, and it was soon in serious financial difficulty. The Findhorn Railway appealed to the I&AJR for help, and the larger company took it over, effective from 1 March 1862. (Note: Vallance; Ross says the agreement was made 4 March and effective 30 March.) (The I&AJR became a constituent of the Highland Railway in 1865.) The Findhorn Company's own locomotive was disposed of to the I&AJR in 1862, becoming that company's no 16. (Note: Vallance says directly to a contractor.) The Kinloss station was relocated to its earlier position.

The I&AJR too found that it was impossible to cover operating expenses, estimated at £800 annually, and it was renegotiated with the Highland Railway in March 1867 and again in 1867. At the latter date the Findhorn Railway's directors were made responsible for the future shortfall, but they withdrew that undertaking in January 1869, and the line closed at the end of January 1869. Occasional goods trains ran until 1880. (Note: Vallance says closure on 1 January; local newspapers were often careless about dates at that period; Ross says "The railway closed completely in 1881.") In December 1886 the railway was put up for sale.

Findhorn's activity as a port was severely limited by silting and a sand bar at the entrance to the harbour, which prevented all but the smallest vessels from entering.

Little remains of the track bed, chiefly because of the construction of RAF Kinloss, over its route.

== Locations ==
=== Inverness and Aberdeen Junction Railway main line ===
- Nairn; Inverness and Nairn Railway station; opened 7 November 1855; still open;
- Auldearn; opened 9 December 1895; closed 6 June 1960;
- Brodie; opened 22 December 1857; closed 3 May 1965;
- Dalvey; opened 22 December 1857; closed 25 March 1858;
- Forres; opened 25 March 1858; resited 3 August 1863 for Perth line; station is still open; Perth line was open 1863 – 1965; east to south curve opened 1867; the west to south curve closed in 1967; a short stub to Dallas Dhu siding via the east curve remained in use, closing in 1967;
- Kinloss; opened 25 March 1858; re-sited 18 April 1860 to east as junction station for Findhorn branch; moved back to original site May 1904; closed 3 May 1965; Findhorn branch open 1860 – 1880;
- Alves Junction; for Burghead branch 1862 – 1966;
- Alves; opened 25 March 1858; closed 3 May 1965;
- Mosstowie; opened 15 October 1890; closed 7 March 1955;
- Elgin; opened 25 March 1858; still open; Morayshire Railway to Lossiemouth and other branches 1852 – 1968;
- Lhanbryde; opened 18 August 1858; closed 7 December 1964;
- Fochabers; opened 18 August 1858; renamed Orbliston Junction 21 October 1893; renamed Orbliston 18 June 1962; closed 7 December 1964; Fochabers branch open 1893 – 1968;
- Orton; opened 18 August 1858; relocated 1859 north of junction; closed 7 December 1964;
- Orton Junction; opened 1859; junction for Morayshire Railway 1858 – 1880;
- Mulben; opened 18 August 1858; closed 7 December 1964;
- Keith; GNoS station opened 11 October 1856; I&AJR part opened 18 August 1858; renamed Keith Junction 1952/3; reverted to Keith 12 May 1980; still open; Portessie branch open 1884 - 1966.

== Current operations ==
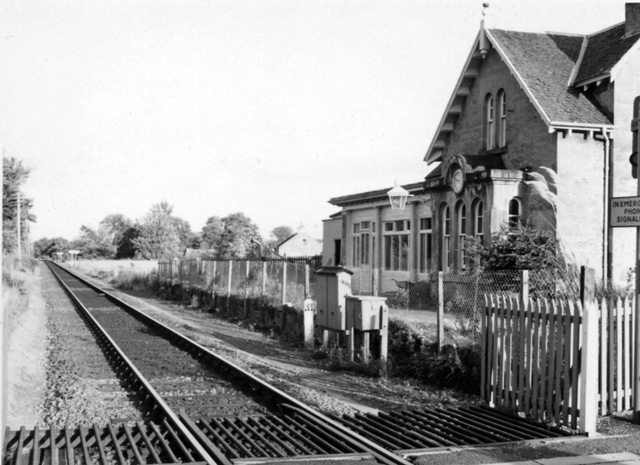
Brodie station in 1974

The main line continues in use as part of the Aberdeen to Inverness line: passenger services are provided by ScotRail at approximately a two-hourly interval on weekdays; there is a minimal service on Sundays. Stations within the original extent of the line are open at Nairn, Forres, Elgin and Keith.

Connections to adjacent lines are also closed, with the exception of the Hopeman Branch which branched off the main line at Alves & was used for freight traffic to Burghead Maltings until 1992 - it remained intact through to Burghead but was mothballed in 1998. The junction with the main line was finally removed this century and the remains of the branch from Alves to Roseisle Maltings now lie heavily overgrown.

The old station at Forres is closed and only one platform out of the previous six at the new station at Forres is now in service. The Keith and Dufftown Railway platform at Keith Junction is still in use, though the branch beyond a short stub is closed.

Freight traffic is limited to occasional trainloads of whisky and containers to/from Elgin, where the former GNoSR Elgin East station yard is still operational.

== Heritage lines ==
The Keith and Dufftown Railway heritage group reopened the Dufftown line beyond Keith Town in 2001, and they hope to reinstate the missing link back to the national network at Keith in the long term.
