= G&SWR 381 Class =

Class of British 4-6-0 locomotives

Type and origin
- Power type: Steam
- Designer: James Manson
- Builder: North British Locomotive Co. (10); G&SWR Kilmarnock Works (7)
- Serial number: 15734-15743
- Build date: 1903-1910
- Total produced: 17
Specifications
- Configuration
  - Whyte: 4-6-0
  - UIC: 2′C h2
- Gauge: 4 ft 8 1/2 in (1,435 mm)
- Leading dia.: 3 ft 8 in (1,118 mm)
- Driver dia.: 6 ft 6 in (1,981 mm)
- Wheelbase: 27 ft 8 in (8.43 m)
- Length: 64 ft 6 in (19.66 m)
- Height: 12 ft 11 1/2 in (3.950 m)
- Axle load: 18.5 long tons (18.8 t; 20.7 short tons)
- Loco weight: 67.2 long tons (68.3 t; 75.3 short tons)
- Tender weight: 50.0 long tons (50.8 t; 56.0 short tons)
- Total weight: 117.2 long tons (119.1 t; 131.3 short tons)
- Fuel type: Coal
- Fuel capacity: 4 long tons (4.1 t)
- Water cap.: 4,100 imp gal (19,000 L; 4,900 US gal)
- Firebox
  - Grate area: 24.58 sq ft (2.284 m^{2})
- Boiler pressure: 180 psi (1,240 kPa)
- Heating surface
  - Firebox: 131 sq ft (12.2 m^{2})
  - Tubes and flues: 1,721 sq ft (159.9 m^{2})
  - Total surface: 1,850 sq ft (172 m^{2})
- Cylinders: Two
- Cylinder size: 20 in × 26 in (508 mm × 660 mm)
- Valve gear: Stephenson
Performance figures
- Tractive effort: 20,400 lbf (90.74 kN)
Career
- Operators: G&SWR » LMS
- Class: G&SWR: 381
- Power class: LMS: 3P
- Numbers: G&SWR: 381-390, 119-129; (from 1919): 495-511; LMS: 14656-14674
- Retired: 1927–1933
- Disposition: All scrapped

The G&SWR 381 Class were the first 4-6-0 locomotives built for the Glasgow & South Western Railway. 17 members were constructed between 1903 and 1911 under CME James Manson to power the G&SWR's connecting express from the Midland Railway between Carlisle and Glasgow.

== Design ==
The 381 was the first 4-6-0 design built for the G&SWR and designed to upgrade motive power on Clyde Coast Express's between Carlisle Citadel and Glasgow St. Enoch. At the time, express train weights were exceeding the maximum weight that the Class 8 4-4-0s were allowed to pull by themselves and double-heading was very common.

The design proposal that lead to the Class 381 were between a four-cylinder 4-4-0 sharing the boiler design with what would become the Class 240, and a 4-6-0 design. Chairman Patrick Caird found the latter design more suitable, and sent it out for production in March 1902.

The design was originally to be built by Glasgow-based engine builders Sharp Stewart and Co., but by the time the locomotives were delivered in June 1903, Sharp Stewart had been absorbed into the North British Locomotive Co. The engines carried Sharp Stewart-style work's plates with North British Works numbers; each engine cost £3,738 (equivalent to £392,966 in 2025).

They were the first and only class on the G&SWR to use Belpaire fireboxes, and the first use of the design in Scotland. The boiler was also the first on the G&SWR not to be built in the three ring telescoped style, with the boiler rings being of equal diameter. As built, they were fitted with 4 ft 1/2 in (1.232 m) long smokeboxes and cast iron chimneys. The most distinctive feature of the design was the eight-wheel bogie tender, which carried 4,100 gallons of water for the journey across the border. The final three engines were built with six-wheel tenders, which carried the same amount of coal and water, but at a weight of 44t as opposed to the 50t bogie tenders.

The class was built in two batches between 1903 and 1910, with a development of the class, the superheated 128 Class arriving from North British in 1911 with an updated design.

Numbers	Build Date	Builder	Notes
381-390	1903	North British Locomotive Company	Fitted with brake blocks ahead of the driving wheels.
119-120 123-127	1910	G&SWR Kilmarnock Works	Slightly heavier at 67 t 19 cwt, brake blocks fitted behind the driving wheels. Nos. 125, 126 & 127 were given six-wheeled tenders. Cab cut-out heights altered.

== Service ==
The first engines entered service in May 1903 and were put to work hauling express along the Clyde Coast line, including taking over the Scotch Express, the Midlands 9:30 luncheon train at Carlisle to continue the train to Glasgow. They handled these services with aplomb, only struggling during the summer months, where heavier trains required a pilot locomotive. The 381 Class were described as free-running, and engines crew found them very easy to operate, with the only issues being that the axleboxes on the tenders would run hot, a problem fixed by the next summer in 1904. The engines in G&SWR tradition were run without hurry up the gradients, particularly the 15 mile stretch between Holywood and Thornhill at 1 in 175 average grade, and the shorter 5 mile section between Barrhead and Caldwell at a more demanding 1 in 80 grade; the engineering department considered the former "the most trying". The 381 Class locomotives were very capable of tackling the banks with trains up to 15 coaches with ease and a coal consumption of between 50–55 lb (23–25 kg) per mile. The locomotives would be let loose when running in the downward direction, recording speeds of up to 65 mph (105 km/h) or even 83 mph (134 km/h) with assistance from a pilot loco.

The first 10 locomotives were allocated to sheds along their new Anglo-Scottish route, with Nos. 381, 384-5, 387-9 being allocated to Corkerhill Shed in Glasgow and 382, 383 and 386 allocated to Currock Road in Carlisle. The later batch of seven engines built at the G&SWR's own Kilmarnock Works were assigned to Corkerhill (Nos. 119, 120, 123 and 124) and Currock Sheds (Nos. 125, 126 and 127; all of which had six wheeled tenders).

Economy measures placed on the engines in the years leading up to and into the Great War significantly affected locomotive performance. The increased wear and lacking maintenance lead to several problems that plagued the class during peacetime, exacerbated by the hard running and little downtime. The hard running proved the locomotives did not have especially rigid front ends with problems around this area emerging with the development of boiler tube leakage Problems with the smokeboxes also started drawing in excess air, cutting down on performance and causing cylinder wear. The locomotives would undergo reconditioning post-war, but they would not match their pre-war performance. By this time they were still in charge of the heaviest expresses, but had also been given charge of trains on the line to Ayr, and after a new 60 ft turntable was installed Girvan, they also started worked trains down the coast. One interesting duty undertaken by Carlisle-allocated engines was taking the West Coast sleeper trains up from Carlisle to St. Enoch via the G&SWR's line, returning the following morning with the 10 am Glasgow Central to Carlisle service via Carstairs while piloted by one of the Caledonian Railway's 4-4-0s.

== Modifications ==
Despite Peter Drummond having taken over Manson as CME in 1912, his work with the G&SWR was on his own new locomotive types and left his predecessor's locomotives without major modifications until after the war. Despite trials with the superheated Class 128, fitting the 381 class with new superheated boilers was not undertaken; Manson had retired not long after trials with the 128 class, and Drummond lacked interest with developing further 4-6-0 designs. Under the new CME Robert Whitelegg, who had taken up office in 1919 after Drummond's death in 1918, the class started undergoing modifications as they entered Kilmarnock Works. The most noticeable change with the 381 class was the length extension of their smokeboxes from 4 ft 1/2 in (1.232 m) to 5 ft 1/2 in (1.537 m), replacing the original Vacuum Oil lubricators with Detroit lubricators, and the addition of Whitelegg's distinctive circlet smokebox rails on his convex smokebox doors. These were done in conjunction with the fitting of larger 8 ft 9 in fireboxes, compared to the original 8 ft design. Nos. 126 and 127 were fitted with Whitelegg pattern cabs, which by this time had been renumbered under Whitelegg's new 1919 Numbering system to Nos. 510 and 511. During 510's overhaul, it was given No. 384's bogie tender for company photography, whilst 511 was given a Capuchon chimney.

Whitelegg's most notable new feature was his deep parallel chimney liner, a modification that according to former National Railway Museum Librarian Phil Atkins "conferred indifferent steaming capabilities upon any locomotive on which it was inflicted." The extended smokebox whilst impressive had also played a part in upsetting the engines steaming this in combination with the liner caused them to steam poorly. The only way found to steam the 381 class reliably was through fitting of a device on mouth plate of the blastpipe with a variable crank that lowered the device, to give some form of effect to the steaming, even if that was likely to interrupt the airflow. English crews nicknamed the device "Jemmy", a slang term for a crowbar, while Scottish crews called them "Razors".

The performance of the engines had dropped badly, and on 12 November 1920, E.C. Poultney went on a footplate trip aboard engine No. 510, one of the heaviest modified locomotives. He noted in The Engineer that the performance of the engine on a Glasgow to Carlisle Express "[the engine] was developing very nearly all the power it could for a sustained period of time", and that the poor fireman was shovelling between 10 to 12 shovels of coal into the firebox every two minutes, only receiving reprieve on the long descents that the route's hills provided. This was a stark contrast to the class's easy-running recorded by fellow The Engineer writer, Charles Rous-Marten, in his own article in 1905 that was published concurrently in The Railway Magazine. Rous-Marten described the engines with glowing reviews from himself and loco crews; at the time, the engines were consuming 50–55 lb (23–25 kg) of coal per mile.

One final concept was pitched to renew the locomotive performance under Whitelegg came in 1922, which suggested that the engines be rebuilt using 5 ft 6 3/16 in (1.681 m) boilers and 22 in × 26 in (560 mm × 660 mm) cylinders from the then-new Class 540 Baltic tanks. This however could hardly be called a rebuilt, as the modifications required would have likely included brand new frames, and the result would have been closer to a paper rebuilt similar to that of the later LMS Patriots.

== Members ==
In 1919, Whitelegg renumbered the whole class and the G&SWR at large under his new logical system, with the Class 381 becoming Nos. 495-511. The succeeding LMS instituted its own renumbering in 1925, with the engines becoming No.'s 14656-14672, while engines 510 and 511 swapping in the sequence in order for the latter becoming the higher in the sequence as 14671. They also gained power class 3P comparable, to the non-superheated LNWR Experiment Class of similar vintage.

G&SWR no.	G&SWR (1919) no.	LMS no.	Builder	Delivered	Withdrawn
381	495	14656	North British Locomotive Co.	June 1903	February 1931
382	496	14657	North British Locomotive Co.	June 1903	1928
383	497	14658	North British Locomotive Co.	June 1903	1930
384	498	14659	North British Locomotive Co.	June 1903	1933
385	499	14660	North British Locomotive Co.	July 1903	September 1927
386	500	14661	North British Locomotive Co.	July 1903	April 1928
387	501	14662	North British Locomotive Co.	July 1903	1930
388	502	14663	North British Locomotive Co.	July 1903	October 1932
389	503	14664	North British Locomotive Co.	July 1903	July 1931
390	504	14665	North British Locomotive Co.	July 1903	1930
119	505	14666	G&SWR Kilmarnock	January 1910	December 1931
120	506	14667	G&SWR Kilmarnock	January 1910	September 1931
123	507	14668	G&SWR Kilmarnock	June 1910	January 1928
124	508	14669	G&SWR Kilmarnock	July 1910	1930
125	509	14670	G&SWR Kilmarnock	December 1910	August 1931
126	510	14672	G&SWR Kilmarnock	January 1911	November 1932
127	511	14671	G&SWR Kilmarnock	February 1911	October 1931

== Withdrawal ==
With the grouping act in 1923, the G&SWR became part of the London Midland and Scottish Railway. The introduction of new LMS standard designs such as the LMS 2Ps replacing the aging pre-Manson 4-4-0s and the LMS Compounds meant that the 381s began to be displaced, with the 381s at Currnock Road being ousted by the closure of the shed and its stock moving to Carlisle Kingmoor. They still handled trains on the Coast Line to Ayr, with engines from Currnock moving to Corkerhill and Ayr sheds, while the Whitelegg-rebuilt engines Nos. 14670 and 14671 went to Dumfries and Hurlfold (Kilmarnock) respectively in 1927. The former shed at Corkerhill in Glasgow still offered one main line express duty to the 4-6-0s, remaining as such until the shed received its first Compounds in 1927 and mass-withdrawals commenced. All members of the class were scrapped by 1934, after the final engines were withdrawn in 1933.

Year	Number in service at start of year	Number withdrawn	Locomotive numbers
1927	17	1	14660
1928	16	3	14657,14661,14668
1930	13	4	14659, 14662, 14665, 14669
1931	9	6	14656, 14664, 14666, 14667, 14669, 14671
1932	3	2	14663, 14672
1933	1	1	14658
