= Highland Railway X Class =

HR X class
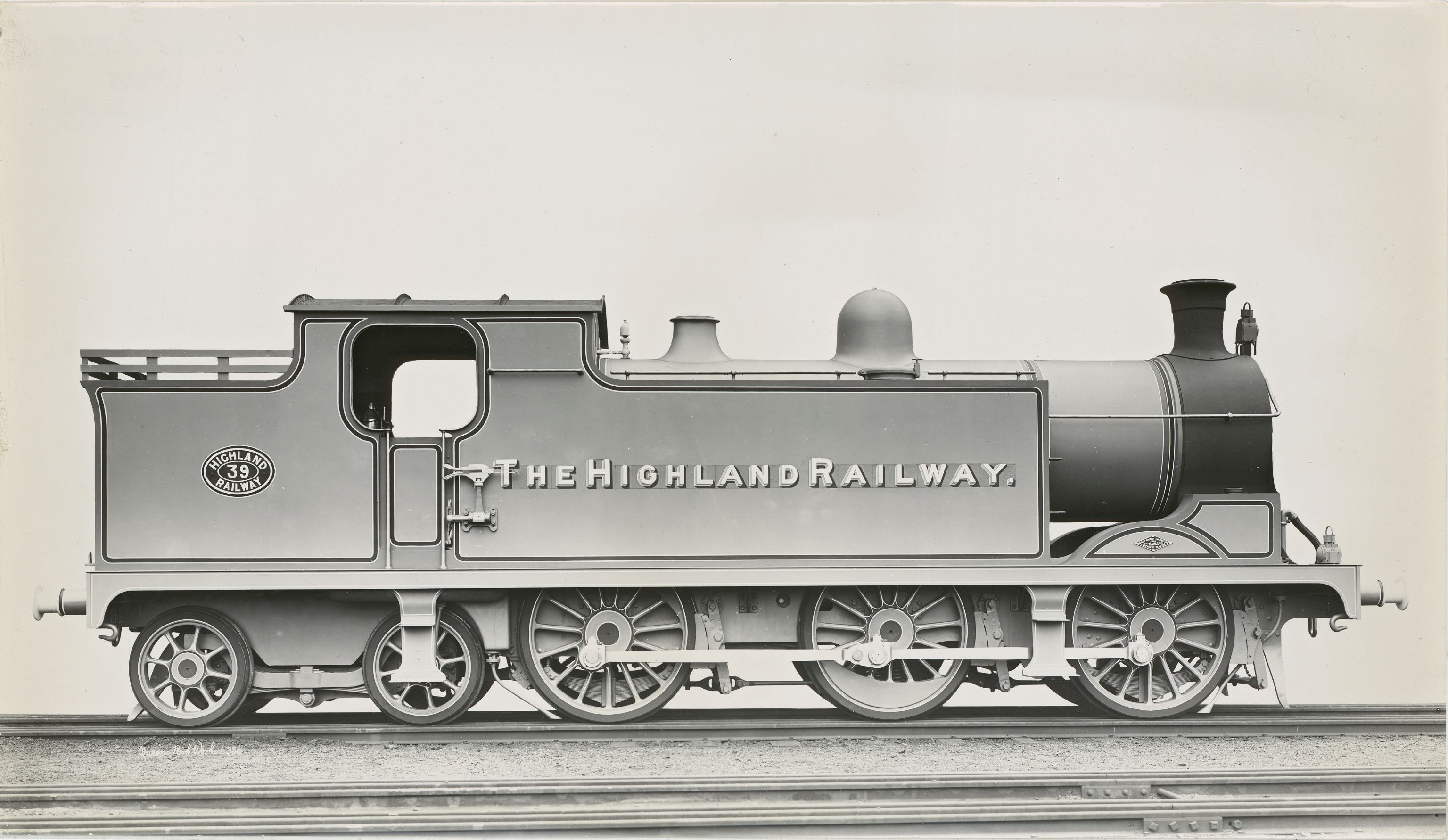
Type and origin
- Power type: Steam
- Designer: Peter Drummond
- Builder: North British Locomotive Company
- Serial number: 18805–18808, 19013–19016
- Build date: 1909–1911
- Total produced: 8
Specifications
- Configuration
  - Whyte: 0-6-4T
  - UIC: C2′ n2t
- Gauge: 4 ft 8 1/2 in (1,435 mm) standard gauge
- Driver dia.: 5 ft 0 in (1.524 m)
- Trailing dia.: 3 ft 3 in (0.991 m)
- Loco weight: 69.0 long tons (70.1 t; 77.3 short tons)
- Fuel type: Coal
- Fuel capacity: 4.5 long tons (4.6 t; 5.0 short tons)
- Water cap.: 1,970 imp gal (9,000 L; 2,370 US gal)
- Firebox
  - Grate area: 22.5 sq ft (2.09 m^{2})
- Boiler: 4 ft 6 1/4 in (1.38 m)
- Boiler pressure: 180 lbf/in^{2} (1.24 MPa)
- Heating surface
  - Firebox: 120 sq ft (11 m^{2})
  - Tubes: 1,148 sq ft (106.7 m^{2})
  - Total surface: 1,268 sq ft (117.8 m^{2})
- Cylinders: Two, inside
- Cylinder size: 18 1/2 in × 26 in (470 mm × 660 mm)
Performance figures
- Tractive effort: 22,082 lbf (98.23 kN)
Career
- Operators: HR → LMS
- Class: HR: X
- Power class: LMS: 4P
- Nicknames: "Banking Tanks"
- Withdrawn: 1932–1936
- Disposition: All scrapped

The Highland Railway Drummond 0-6-4T or X class were large tank engines designed by Peter Drummond, originally intended for banking duty.

== Construction ==
The first four were built by the North British Locomotive Company and delivered in 1909. A second batch of four was delivered in 1911.

== Design ==
The design was derived from the Class K 0-6-0 tender engines and leading dimensions were very similar, although the boiler and firebox are recorded as 'larger' by an unspecified amount.

== Reputation ==
They were not popular with crews, many finding them heavy and clumsy and several having problems with water capacity. Their axleboxes also consistently ran hot as well.

== Numbering ==
HR No.	Built	LMS No.	Withdrawn	Notes
39	1909	15300	December 1936	
64	1909	15301	October 1934	Renumbered 66 in 1909
65	1909	15302	August 1933	Renumbered 68 in 1909
69	1909	15303	October 1932	
29	1911	15304	October 1932	Renumbered 43 in 1913
31	1911	15305	November 1934	
42	1911	15306	November 1935	
44	1911	15307	November 1934	

== Transfer to LMS ==
All entered London, Midland and Scottish Railway (LMS) ownership in 1923 and were renumbered 15300–7 with the power classification 4; this was revised to 4P in 1928. Six locomotives (LMS nos. 15300–3/5/7) received the LMS red livery but were later repainted black; the other two (LMS nos. 15304/6) went directly from HR green to LMS black. Withdrawal commenced in 1932, and was completed in 1936.
