= G&SWR 5 Class =

Class of 0-6-0T steam locomotives

G&SWR 5 Class (later G&SWR 322 Class)
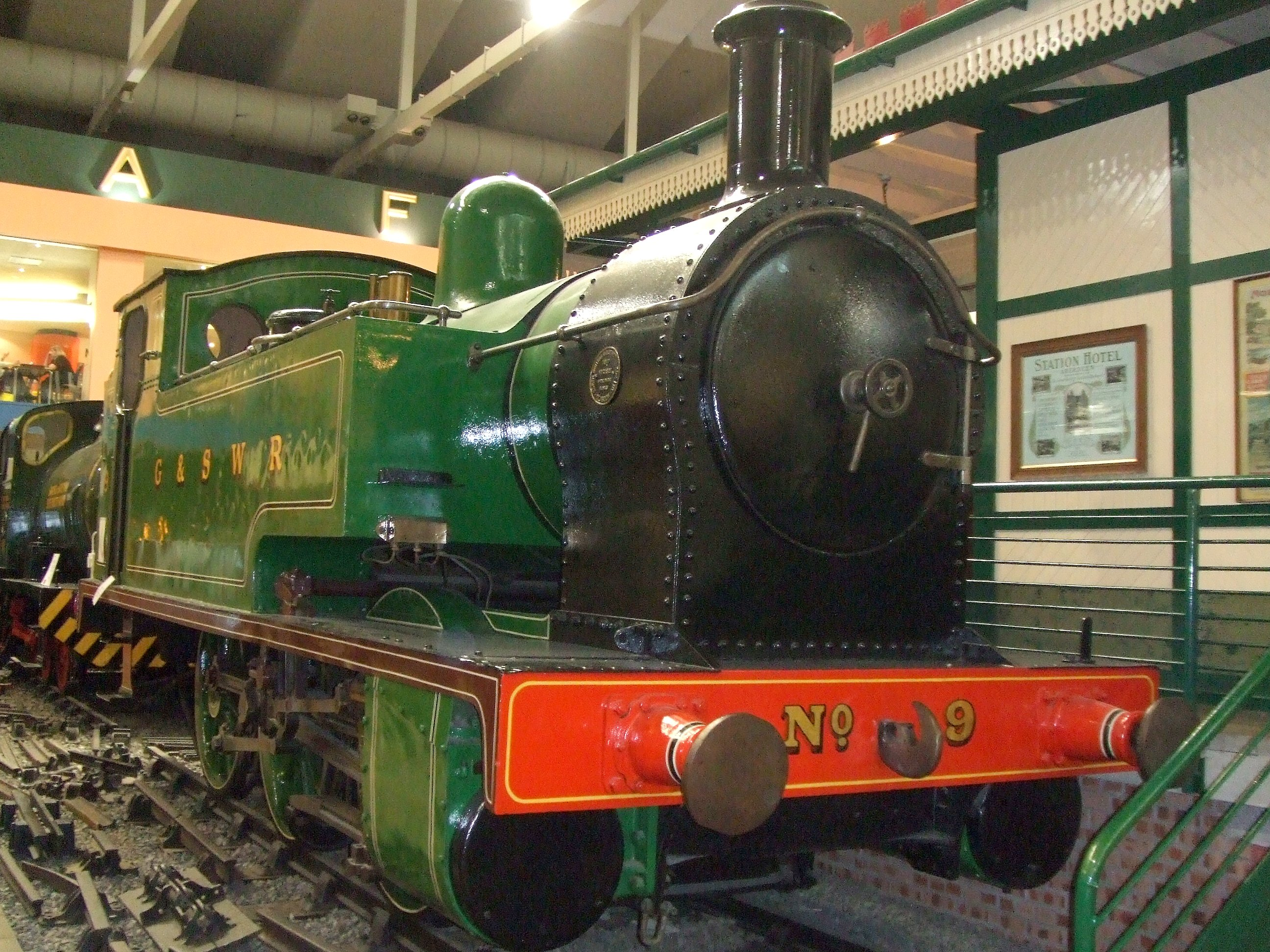
- No 9 at the former Glasgow Museum of Transport, 2007
Type and origin
- Power type: Steam
- Designer: Peter Drummond
- Builder: North British Locomotive Company, Hyde Park Works, Glasgow
- Serial number: 21519-21521
- Build date: 1917
- Total produced: 3
Specifications
- Configuration
  - Whyte: 0-6-0T
- Gauge: 4 ft 8 1/2 in (1,435 mm)
- Driver dia.: 4 ft 2 in (1.27 m)
- Loco weight: 40 long tons (41 t)
- Fuel type: coal
- Boiler pressure: 160 psi (1,100 kPa)
- Cylinders: Two
- Cylinder size: 17 in × 22 in (432 mm × 559 mm)
- Valve gear: Walschaerts
Performance figures
- Tractive effort: 17,294 lbf (76.93 kN)
Career
- Operators: G&SWR • LMS
- Class: G&SWR: 5
- Power class: LMS: 2F
- Withdrawn: 1934 (two sold out of service)
- Restored: 1964
- Current owner: Glasgow Riverside Museum
- Disposition: 1 preserved, remainder scrapped

The G&SWR 5 Class are 0-6-0T steam locomotives designed by Peter Drummond for the Glasgow and South Western Railway (G&SWR) and introduced in 1917. The class was originally designated 5 Class but, after the G&SWR's 1919 renumbering, this was changed to 322 Class. After passing to the London, Midland and Scottish Railway (LMS) in 1923 they were given power classification 2F.

== Design and Operation ==
The 5 Class were built to replace elderly 0-4-0 tender locomotives on a number of freight lines which featured sharp curves and steep gradients. Number 5 was allocated to Greenock (Princes Pier) shed for dock shunting, whereas the other two were allocated to Ardrossan shed for colliery branches in the Kilwinning and Dalry area. They remained at these sheds throughout their lives in Railway ownership. Although they were a successful design, they were a non-standard type and the LMS Northern Division had plenty of former Caledonian Railway 498 Class dock tanks, so the three locomotives were withdrawn in 1934. As they were not yet life-expired, two of the locomotives were sold to collieries and eventually became the property of the National Coal Board.

== Preservation ==
By the mid 1950s the former number 9 was the last Glasgow and South Western Railway locomotive in existence. In 1963 it was acquired by British Railways for preservation and restored to G&SWR green livery. It was then displayed in the Glasgow Museum of Transport, moving with the museum from its original location in the former Coplawhill tram works to the Kelvin Hall in 1987, and then to the new Riverside Museum in 2010.

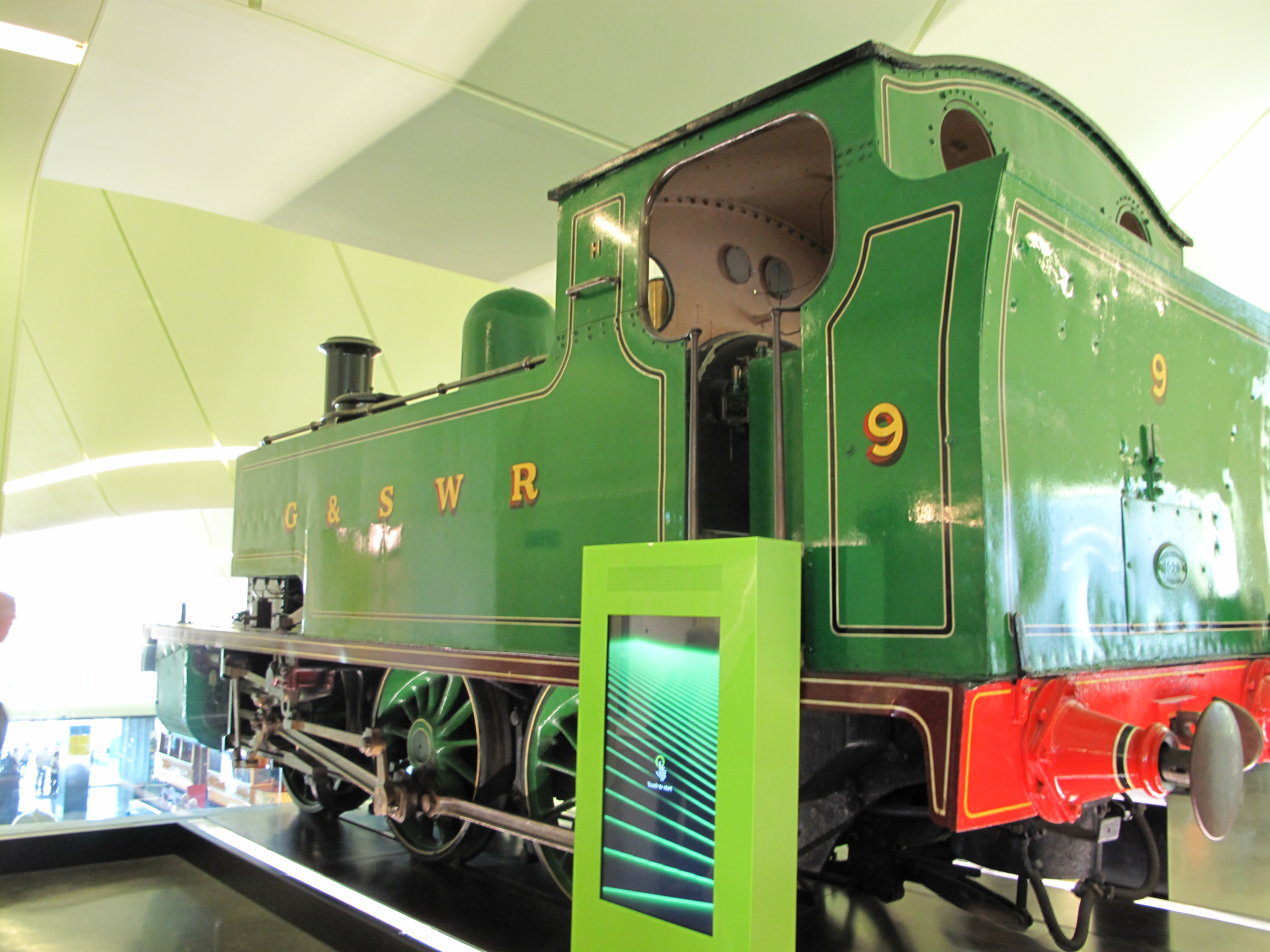
No.9 at the Riverside Museum Glasgow, 19 August 2012

The locomotive is prominently displayed on the first floor balcony within the present museum above the other Scottish locomotives, with its front end projecting out over the balcony to provide a view of the underside of the cylinders.

== Numbering and Locomotive Histories ==
| GSWR (original) no. | GSWR (1919) no. | LMS no. | Builder's no. | Delivered | Withdrawn | notes |
|---|---|---|---|---|---|---|
| 5 | 322 | 16377 | NBL 21519 | 11/1917 | 04/1934 | withdrawn 4/32 but reinstated. |
| 7 | 323 | 16378 | NBL 21520 | 11/1917 | 04/1934 | sold to Hatfield Colliery, South Yorkshire, scrapped after 1954 |
| 9 | 324 | 16379 | NBL 21521 | 11/1917 | 04/1934 | sold to Llay Main Colliery, Denbighshire, now preserved |
