= Highland Railway Drummond 0-6-0 Class =

Highland Railway K class
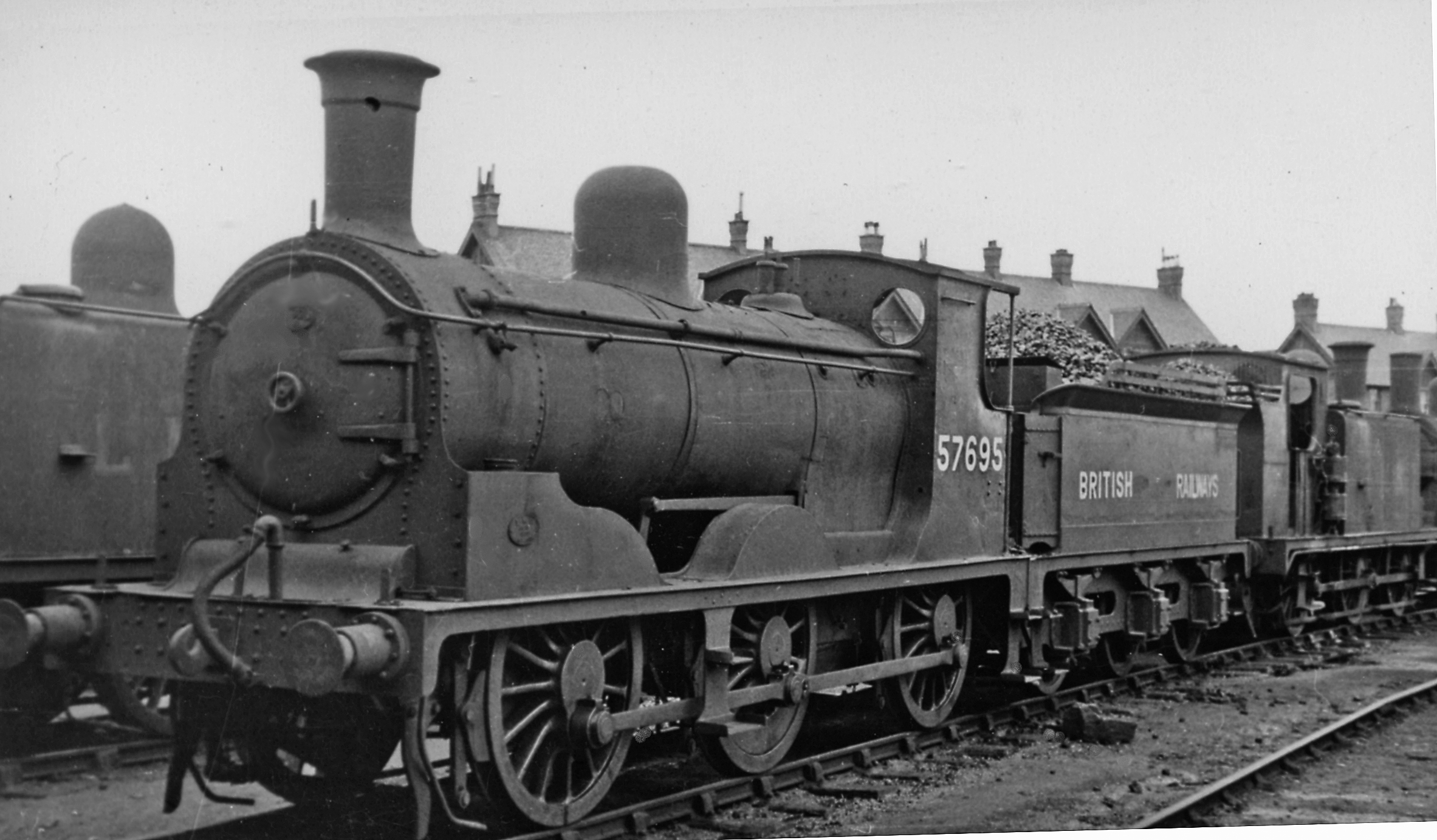
- No. 57695 at Corkerhill Locomotive Depot, Glasgow 15 August 1948.
Type and origin
- Power type: Steam
- Designer: Peter Drummond
- Builder: Dübs & Co. (10); North British Locomotive Co. (2)
- Serial number: Dübs: 3842–3847, 4240–4243; NBL: 17896–17897
- Build date: 1900 (6), 1902 (4), 1907 (2)
- Total produced: 12
Specifications
- Configuration
  - Whyte: 0-6-0
  - UIC: C n2g
- Gauge: 4 ft 8 1/2 in (1,435 mm) standard gauge
- Driver dia.: 5 ft 0 in (1.524 m)
- Loco weight: 43.0 long tons (43.7 t; 48.2 short tons)
- Firebox
  - Grate area: 20.5 sq ft (1.90 m^{2})
- Boiler: Same as class C
- Boiler pressure: 175 psi (1.21 MPa)
- Cylinders: Two (inside)
- Cylinder size: 18 1/4 in × 26 in (464 mm × 660 mm)
- Valve gear: Stephenson
Performance figures
- Tractive effort: 21,469 lbf (95.50 kN)
Career
- Operators: Highland Railway →London, Midland & Scottish →British Railways
- Class: HR: K
- Power class: LMS/BR: 3F
- Withdrawn: 1936, 1946–1952
- Disposition: All scrapped

The Highland Railway K class were the only class of 0-6-0 tender locomotives built for the Highland Railway. They were introduced in 1900, to the design of Peter Drummond. The class were known as 'Barneys'.

== Design ==
They were standard designs for British practice of the time, with inside cylinders and 5 ft 0 in (1.524 m) diameter driving wheels.

== Construction ==
The first six (Nos. 134 to 139) were built by Dübs and Company in 1900. These had inside bearing double bogie tenders, rather like the watercart designs brother Dugald was supplying on the London and South Western Railway. These were later transferred to C and U class (Ben) locomotives.

Four more (Nos. 18 to 21) were supplied by Dübs in 1902. These lacked the watercart tenders but had cross water tubes in the firebox. No. 21 is recorded as retaining this boiler in unmodified form until 1934.

A final pair (Nos. 36 and 55) was built by the North British Locomotive Company in 1907.

== Transfer to LMS ==
All passed into London, Midland and Scottish Railway (LMS) ownership in 1923. The first was withdrawn in 1936, but all others stayed in service until at least 10 years later.

== Transfer to BR ==
Seven survived into British Railways (BR) ownership in 1948. The last was withdrawn and scrapped in 1952.

== Numbering ==
Table of locomotives
HR No.	Manufacturer	Serial No.	Built	LMS No.	BR No.	Withdrawn	Notes
134	Dübs & Co.	3842	February 1900	17693	57693	June 1949	Withdrawn before BR number applied
135	Dübs & Co.	3843	February 1900	17694	57694	February 1950	Withdrawn before BR number applied
136	Dübs & Co.	3844	February 1900	17695	57695	January 1952	
137	Dübs & Co.	3845	February 1900	17696	—	March 1946	
138	Dübs & Co.	3846	February 1900	17697	57697	February 1951	Had stovepipe chimney
139	Dübs & Co.	3847	February 1900	17698	57698	December 1951	
18	Dübs & Co.	4240	August 1902	17699	57699	February 1949	Withdrawn before BR number applied
19	Dübs & Co.	4241	August 1902	17700	—	December 1946	
20	Dübs & Co.	4242	August 1902	17701	—	February 1936	
21	Dübs & Co.	4243	August 1902	17702	57702	November 1949	Withdrawn before BR number applied
36	North British Locomotive Co.	17896	July 1907	17703	—	July 1947	
55	North British Locomotive Co.	17897	July 1907	17704	—	December 1946	
