= Highland Railway Castle Class =

Class of British 4-6-0 locomotives

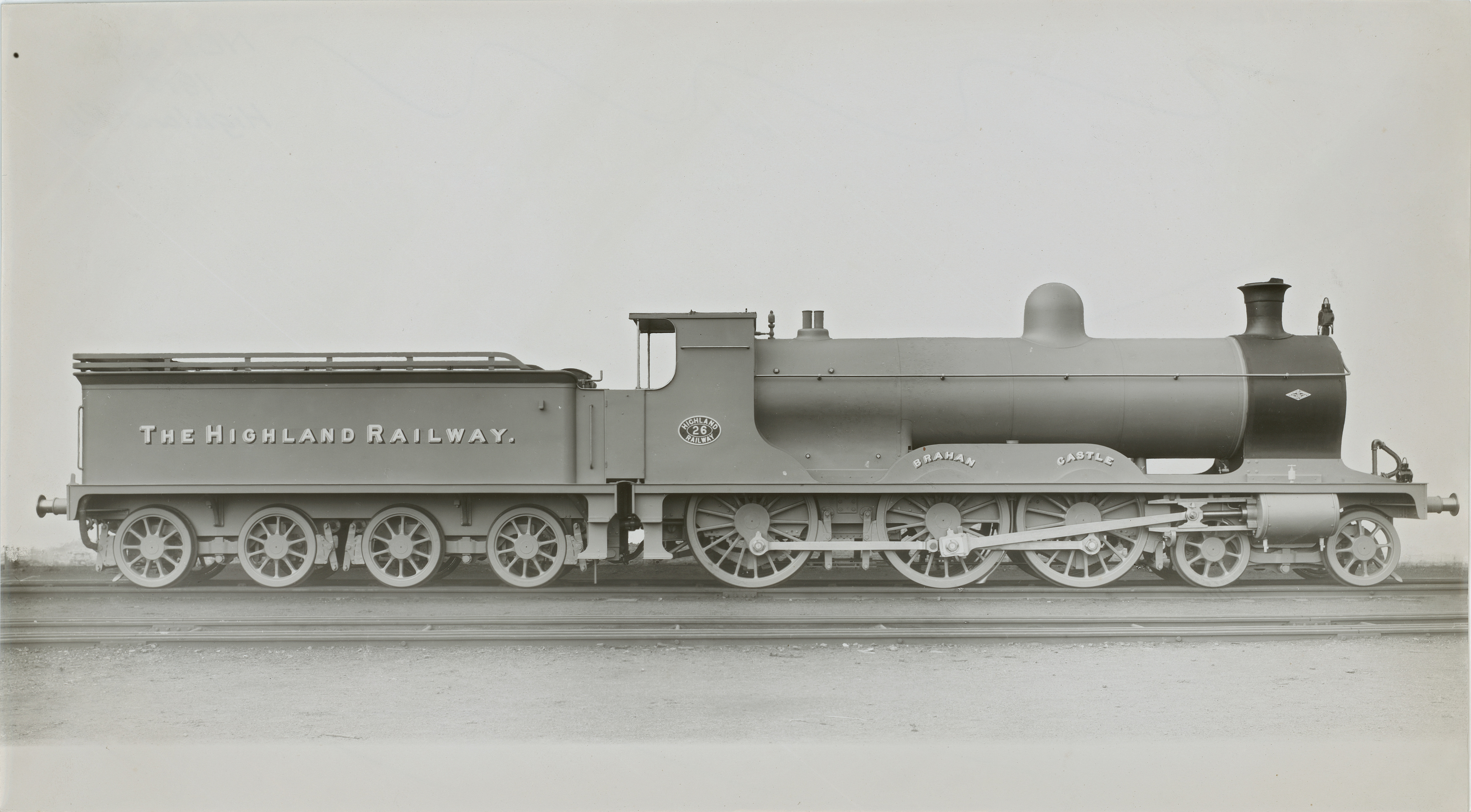
- Highland Railway no.26 Brahan Castle
Type and origin
- Power type: Steam
- Designer: Peter Drummond
- Builder: Dubs & Co. North British Locomotive Co.
- Build date: 1900–1917
- Total produced: 19
Specifications
- Configuration
  - Whyte: 4-6-0
  - UIC: 2'C n2
- Gauge: 4 ft 8 1/2 in (1,435 mm)
- Leading dia.: 3 ft 3 in (990.60 mm)
- Coupled dia.: 5 ft 9 in (1,752.60 mm); 1917 batch: 6 ft 0 in (1,828.80 mm)
- Wheelbase
  - Coupled: 14 ft 3 in (4,343.40 mm); 1917 batch: 14 ft 6 in (4,419.60 mm)
- Loco weight: 1900 batch: 58.85 long tons (59.79 t; 65.91 short tons); 1910 batch: 59.9 long tons (60.86 t; 67.09 short tons); 1917 batch: 60.65 long tons (61.62 t; 67.93 short tons)
- Tender weight: 1900 batch: 44.45 long tons (45.16 t; 49.78 short tons); 1910 batch: 45 long tons (45.72 t; 50.40 short tons); 1917 batch: 46.35 long tons (47.09 t; 51.91 short tons)
- Total weight: 1900 batch: 103.3 long tons (104.96 t; 115.70 short tons); 1910 batch: 104.9 long tons (106.58 t; 117.49 short tons); 1917 batch: 107 long tons (108.72 t; 119.84 short tons)
- Firebox
  - Grate area: 25.6 sq ft (2.38 m^{2})
- Heating surface: 2,064 sq ft (191.8 m^{2})
- Cylinders: Two, outside
- Cylinder size: 19.5 in × 26 in (495 mm × 660 mm)
Career
- Operators: Highland Railway; London, Midland and Scottish Railway
- Withdrawn: 1930-1947
- Disposition: All scrapped

The Highland Railway Castle Class (or the A Class) was a class of 4-6-0 locomotives designed in 1900 by Peter Drummond, chief mechanical engineer of the Highland Railway at the time. 19 locomotives were built by Dübs and North British Locomotive Co. until 1917, and the last were withdrawn from service in 1947.

== History ==
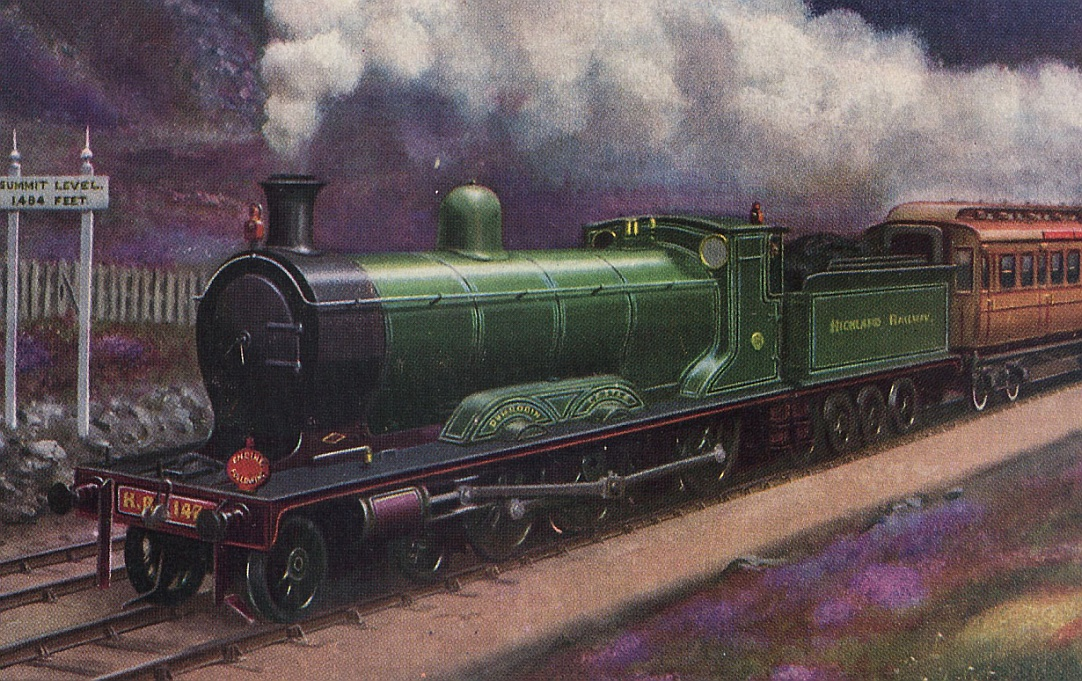
Postcard of a Castle Class locomotive

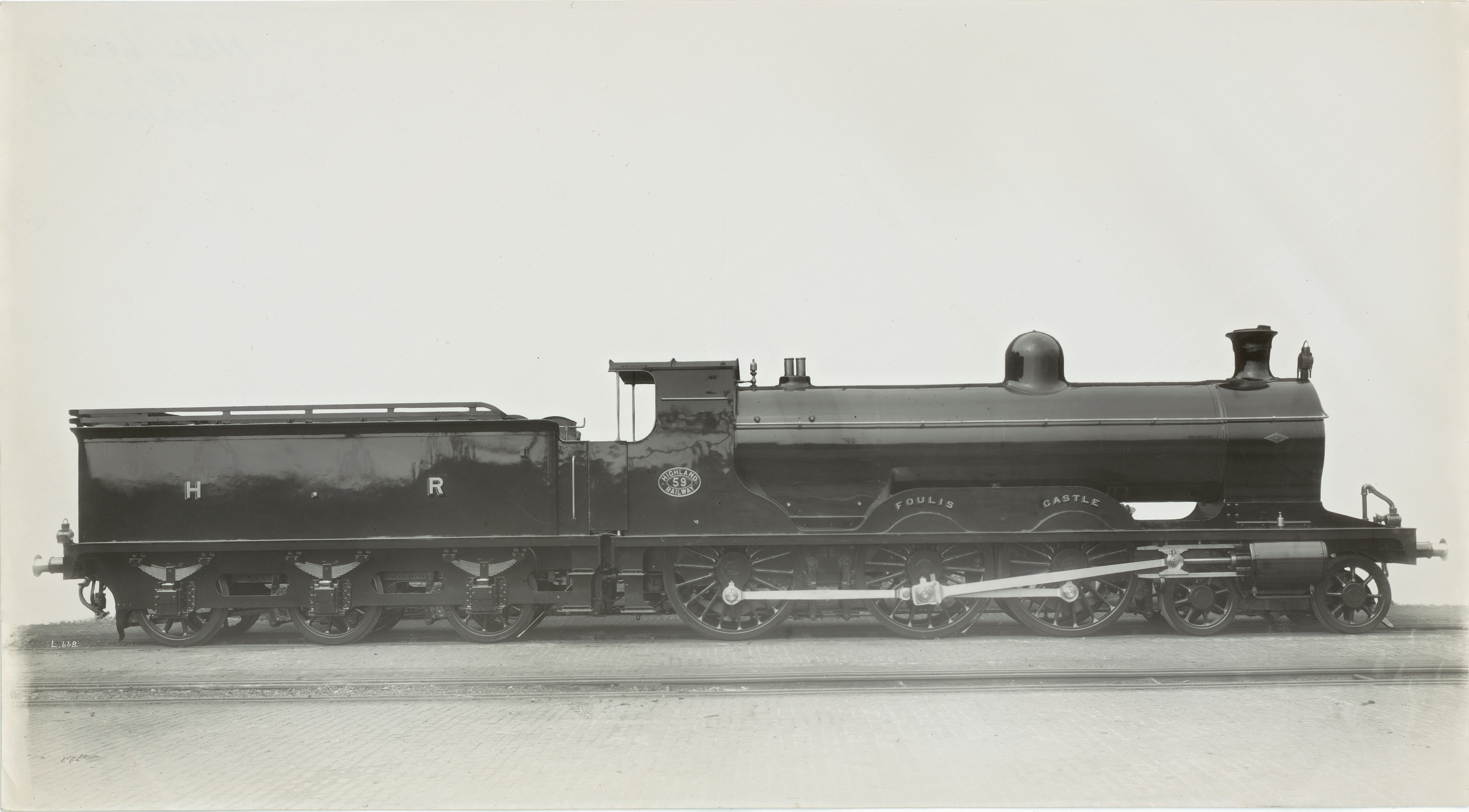
No. 59, built in 1917 with a six-wheel tender

=== Background and construction ===
For some time, the Highland Railway had been planning to purchase new express locomotives, as due to increasing demand, passenger trains were often had to be hauled by two 4-4-0 locomotives on its most important route, the steep Highland Main Line. These plans were initially postponed, as the Highland Railway underwent financial difficulties at the turn of the 20th century, but later brought forward as the Highland Main Line shortcut between Aviemore and Inverness, soon after opening, saw an increase in traffic. The performance of the 1894-built Jones Goods Class used on passenger trains during summer showed the viability of larger locomotives. The resulting dedicated passenger 4-6-0 locomotives designed by Peter Drummond were known as the Castle Class, as they were named after Scottish castles. In 1901, the Highland Railway introduced a classification system for its locomotives, which had previously only been numbered, and designated the locomotives as Class A. For financial reasons, the new locomotives, which were intended primarily for heavy express trains, were delivered in small batches at intervals of several years. The first ten were built by Dübs and Company until 1902, thereafter the North British Locomotive Company, which absorbed Dübs & Co. in 1903, built further examples. At the time of their introduction, the Castle Class were considered the largest 4-6-0 locomotives in Great Britain.

=== Service career ===
Initially, the Castle Class took over heavy passenger trains on the Highland Main Line. After delivery, the first six were allocated to Perth, from where they made five round trips to Inverness per week. In 1910, 146 Skibo Castle was selected for comparison runs on the section over the Pass of Drumochter, but performed rather poorly in comparison with the North British Railway K Class. The North British Railway then shelved their procurement of their own 4-6-0s. Nevertheless, the Castles were able to meet the essential requirements and could haul trains of up to 200 tonnes without a pilot locomotive over the Pass of Drumochter and the Slochd Summit on the shortcut route. On downhill stretches, they reached speeds of up to 70 mph (about 112 km/h) with such trains and could maintain a speed of 25 mph (about 40 km/h) on the most difficult uphill sections.

From 1913, the Castle Class were also used to pull passenger trains on the Far North Line, after no.143 Gordon Castle was successfully trialed hauling a 260-ton train from Inverness to Wick. At the outbreak of the First World War, the Castles were also responsible for hauling passenger trains to Thurso and Wick, carrying naval officers and seamen for the Grand Fleet based at Scapa Flow. From 1917, the Naval Specials, colloquially known as the "Jellicoe Express" after Admiral John Jellicoe, the commander of the fleet, ran between London Euston and Thurso with a journey time of 21.5 hours. These trains were hauled by Castle Class locomotives over the Highland Railway routes in just over 10 hours, with a locomotive exchange being performed at Inverness.

In 1923, all 19 locomotives came under the ownership of the London, Midland and Scottish Railway (LMS) when the Railways Act 1921 came into effect. Their sphere of operation initially remained largely the same, with most of the Castle Class remaining in Perth and Inverness depots. Some were also temporally allocated to Aviemore, Forres, Helmsdale and Wick. Beginning in 1930, the LMS commenced withdrawal of these locomotives. In 1936, some examples were transferred to the former Caledonian Railway line to Oban, now part of the West Highland Line, where they pulled trains between Oban and Glasgow and as far as Dundee. They were stationed at Balornock depot in Glasgow. By the time the Second World War broke out in 1939, ten locomotives had been withdrawn, and in 1945, examples from all batches were still in service. The last example in service, 14690 Dalcross Castle, was withdrawn from Aviemore Sheds in 1947, and scrapped at Inverness a few weeks later. During its service life, it had attained a mileage of 925,290 miles (about 1.49 million kilometers).

=== Design ===
In line with design principals at the time, the Castles were designed as saturated locomotives with plate frames. They were also fitted with slide valves, as the Highland Railway had negative experiences with the piston valve-fitted Loch Class locomotives they had purchased in 1896. The four Castle Class locomotives delivered in 1902 were fitted with Westinghouse brakes, so that they could take over trains from neighbouring railway companies to the south that were equipped with these brakes. In 1912, no.141 Ballindalloch Castle was fitted with a Phoenix superheater, but was deemed unsuccessful, and was later removed, although the locomotive retained the extended smokebox for the superheater until 1917.

The locomotives were equipped with “water cart” bogie tenders, allowing for a larger water capacity than the traditional tree-axle tenders. These bogie tenders were designed by Peter Drummond's brother, Dugald Drummond, who was the chief mechanical engineer for the London and South Western Railway; they too used water cart tenders from 1900 onwards. The wheels, which were exposed due to the use of internal frames, gave these tenders their distinctive appearance.

The four examples built by NBL in 1913 received minor modifications. Externally visible were the extended smokebox and the slightly enlarged chimney. Other minor changes included thicker bottom rings for the firebox and reinforced drive rod bearings. Plans to fit the Schmidt superheater were made, but was dropped. There were major differences in the three examples built in 1917. Christopher Cumming, Drummond's successor, used slightly larger driving wheels, which also increased the wheelbase. Cumming also decided to use the more traditional three-axle tenders, which still could carry a little more water.

From 1916 onwards, the Highland Railway gradually fitted the earlier batches with new boilers, as the existing ones had become worn out due to poor maintenance during the war. In the following period, almost all of the Castle Class received new boilers, some only at the time of the LMS, who also fitted them with new chimneys. Two locomotives received new, slightly modified boilers in 1926, while some others received different components from other constituent companies of the LMS, including smokebox doors based on the Midland Railway design, or a shortened chimney, likely due to a lack of spare parts.

=== Numbering ===
Builder	Works number	Year built	HR No.	Name	LMS No.	Withdrawn
Dübs & Co.	3848	1900	140	Taymouth Castle	14675	1939
Dübs & Co.	3849	1900	141	Ballindalloch Castle	14676	1937
Dübs & Co.	3850	1900	142	Dunrobin Castle	14677	1939
Dübs & Co.	3851	1900	143	Gordon Castle	14678	1946
Dübs & Co.	3852	1900	144	Blair Castle	14679	1936
Dübs & Co.	3853	1900	145	Murthly Castle	14680	1930
Dübs & Co.	4244	1902	146	Skibo Castle	14681	1946
Dübs & Co.	4245	1902	147	Beaufort Castle	14682	1943
Dübs & Co.	4246	1902	148	Cawdor Castle	14683	1937
Dübs & Co.	4247	1902	149	Duncraig Castle	14684	1940
NBL	19011	1910	30	Dunvegan Castle	14685	1945
NBL	19012	1911	35	Urquhart Castle	14686	1946
NBL	20160	1913	26	Brahan Castle	14687	1935
NBL	20161	1913	27	Thurso Castle	14688	1935
NBL	20162	1913	28	Cluny Castle	14689	1944
NBL	20163	1913	43	Dalcross Castle	14690	1947
NBL	21459	1917	50	Brodie Castle	14691	1938
NBL	21460	1917	58	Darnaway Castle	14692	1946
NBL	21461	1917	59	Foulis Castle	14693	1935

== Similar export models ==
=== French locomotives ===
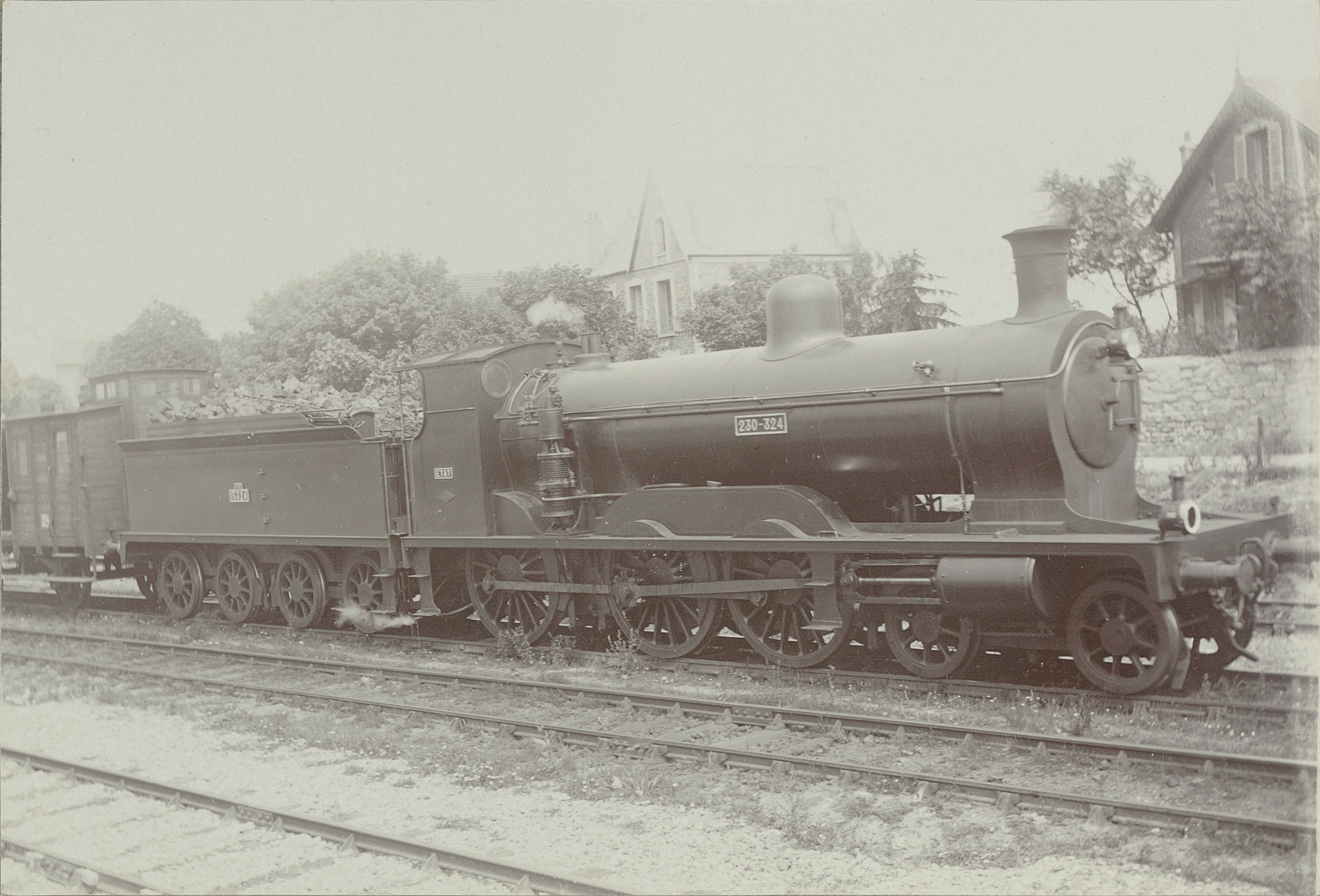
État 230–324 in 1930

The Chemins de fer de l’État ordered 50 locomotives almost identical to the Highland Railway Castles from the North British Locomotive Company in 1911. Their most distinctive feature was the fitting of a steam injector next to the firebox. Numerous details allowed experts to immediately recognise the British origin of these locomotives. The size of the Highland Railway locomotives, which appeared more delicate than comparable French locomotives due to the smaller British loading gauge, was also noticeable. The État placed their locomotives in the 230-321 to 230–370 series. Due to their performance being less satisfactory compared to other État 4-6-0s, they were soon used primarily on secondary services, such as in front of construction trains. From 1933 onwards, État began to decommission these locomotives, with most of them being scrapped before the start of the Second World War.

In 1938, when the Société Nationale des Chemins de fer Français (SNCF) was formed, locomotives 323, 341 and 365 were still serving as reserve locomotives or parts donors until 1941. They were placed under the 3-230 D class.

=== Iberian locomotives ===
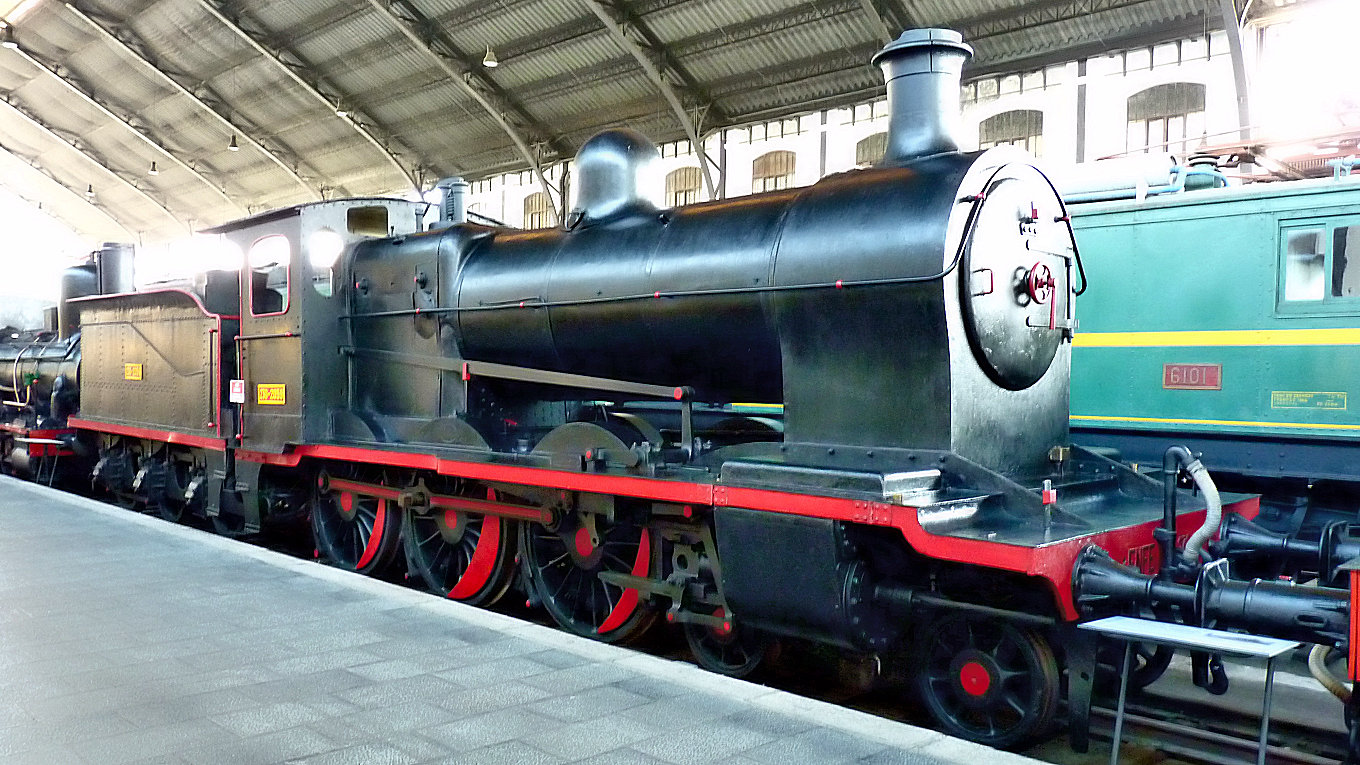
Preserved locomotive in the museum in Madrid

In 1907, NBL built six more Castle Class lookalikes (with more differences than their Scottish and French counterparts, such as the use of the Belpaire firebox) for the Caminhos de Ferro Portugueses da Beira Alta. These were built to the Iberian broad-gauge of 1,668 mm (5 ft 5 21/32 in). These locomotives were later sold to the Ferrocarriles de Medina del Campo a Zamora y de Orense a Vigo, and then to RENFE as class 230.2059–230.2064. One example is on display at the Railway Museum in Madrid.
