= MGWR Class B =

B class
Type and origin
- Power type: Steam
- Designer: Edward Cusack
- Builder: North British
- Build date: 1904
- Total produced: 6
Specifications
- Configuration
  - Whyte: 0-6-0
- Gauge: 5 ft 3 in (1,600 mm)
- Driver dia.: 5 ft 3 in (1,600 mm)
Career
- Operators: Midland Great Western Railway; Great Southern Railways; CIÉ
- Number in class: 4
- Numbers: MGWR 143-146; GSR 646-649
- Locale: Ireland
- Withdrawn: 1930-1939

The Midland Great Western Railway (MGWR) B Class 0-6-0 was a class of 4 locomotives built at North British Locomotive Company in 1904. In 1925 they were allocated Great Southern Railways (GSR) Class 646 / Inchicore Class J2.

MGWR No.	Name	Built	GSR No.	Withdrawn
143	Canada	1904	646	1933
144	Australia	1904	647	1930
145	India	1904	648	1939
146	Africa	1904	649	1939

The MGWR Class B was an attempt at a more powerful 0-6-0 locomotive than the existing Class L. Like the Class A 4-4-0 which they shared some components they were weight restricted to the Dublin-Galway on the MGWR. They were rebuilt 1916/17 with superheating. On scrapping some of their tenders were givin to Class A locomotives.
