= G&SWR 128 Class =

Class of 2 British 4-6-0 locomotives

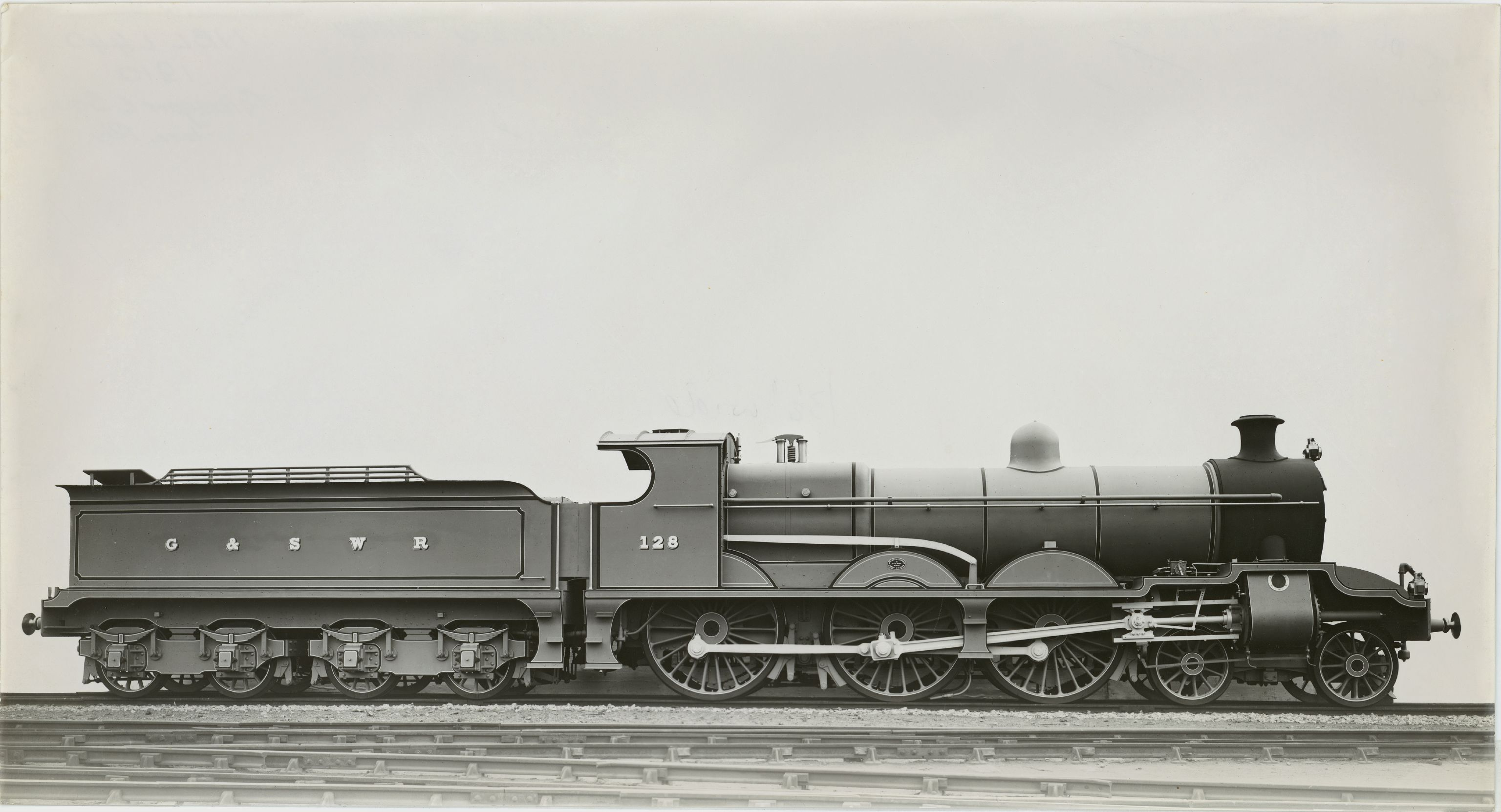
Type and origin
- Power type: Steam
- Designer: James Manson
- Builder: North British Locomotive Co.
- Serial number: 19504–19505
- Build date: 1911
- Total produced: 2
Specifications
- Configuration
  - Whyte: 4-6-0
  - UIC: 2′C h2
- Gauge: 4 ft 8 1/2 in (1,435 mm)
- Leading dia.: 3 ft 8 in (1,118 mm)
- Driver dia.: 6 ft 6 in (1,981 mm)
- Wheelbase: 27 ft 7 in (8.41 m)
- Height: 12 ft 11 1/2 in (3.950 m)
- Loco weight: 69 long tons 2 cwt (154,800 lb or 70.2 t)
- Fuel type: Coal
- Water cap.: 4,100 imp gal (19,000 L; 4,900 US gal)
- Boiler pressure: 160 psi (1,100 kPa)
- Heating surface: 1,560 sq ft (145 m^{2})
- Superheater
  - Type: Schmidt
  - Heating area: 445 sq ft (41.3 m^{2})
- Cylinders: Two
- Cylinder size: 21 in × 26 in (533 mm × 660 mm)
- Valve gear: Stephenson
Performance figures
- Tractive effort: 19,992 lbf (88.93 kN)
Career
- Operators: G&SWR » LMS
- Class: G&SWR: 128
- Power class: LMS: 3P
- Numbers: G&SWR: 128, 129; (from 1919): 512, 513; LMS: 14673, 14674
- Retired: 1933–1934
- Disposition: Both scrapped

The Glasgow and South Western Railway (G&SWR) 128 class was a class of two 4-6-0 steam locomotives designed by James Manson as a development of his 381 Class 4-6-0s, and were his final locomotive design before he retired. They were built in 1911 by the North British Locomotive Company at its Queens Park works and were considered both good looking and excellent performers.

== Numbering ==
=== G&SWR ===
Originally numbered 128 and 129, they became 512 and 513 in the G&SWR renumbering of 1919.

=== LMS ===
After the 1923 grouping they became LMS numbers 14673 and 14674, but were scrapped in 1933 and 1934 under the LMS drive for standardisation.

== Features ==
The 128 class, along with the 381 class, were the only G&SWR locomotives to use the 4-6-0 wheel arrangement, and were also the only G&SWR locos to have Belpaire fireboxes. As originally built, No.129 had a Weir feedwater heater mounted on top of the boiler between the chimney and the dome, but this was removed in 1919. The same locomotive operated for a period as a 4-4-2 after it broke a trailing rod.
