= Highland Railway Ben Class =

Class of 4-4-0 steam locomotives named after Scottish mountains (Ben)

Highland Railway C and U classes 'Small Ben' and 'Large Ben'
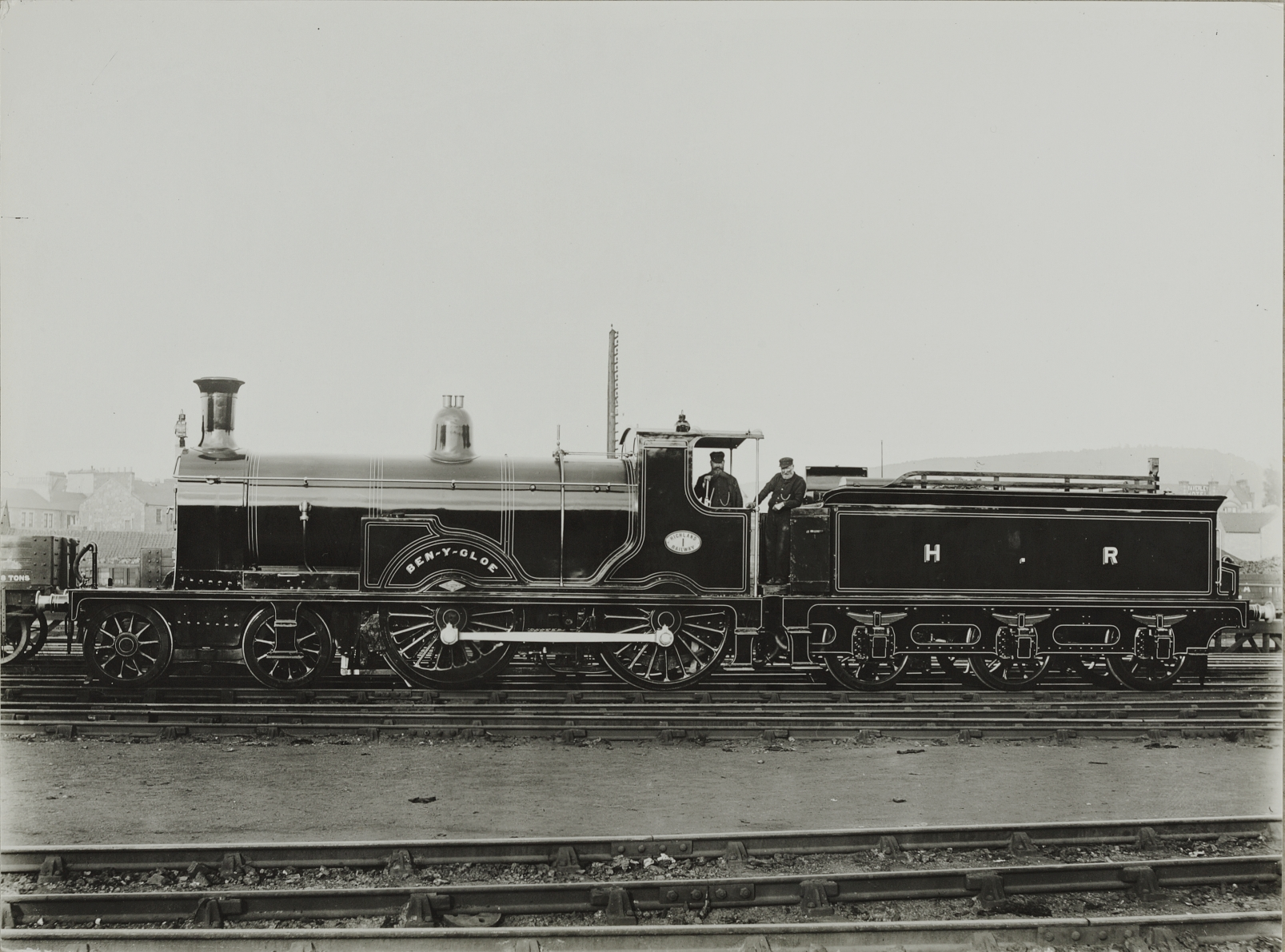
- Highland Railway 1 Ben-y-Gloe
Type and origin
- Power type: Steam
- Designer: Peter Drummond
- Builder: Dübs & Co. (8 Small); HR Lochgorm Works (9 Small); North British Locomotive Co. (3 Small, 6 Large)
- Serial number: Dübs: 3686–3692 (Small); NBL: 17398–17400 (Small), 18269–18272 (Large), 18803–18804 (Large)
- Build date: 1898–1906 (Small); 1908–1909 (Large)
- Total produced: 20 Small; 6 Large
Specifications
- Configuration
  - Whyte: 4-4-0
  - UIC: 2′Bn
- Gauge: 4 ft 8 1/2 in (1,435 mm)
- Leading dia.: 3 ft 6 in (1.067 m)
- Driver dia.: 6 ft 0 in (1.829 m)
- Loco weight: 46 long tons 17 cwt (104,900 lb or 47.6 t) (small); 52.30 long tons (53.14 t) (large)
- Firebox
  - Grate area: 20.5 sq ft (1.90 m^{2}) (Small); 20.25 sq ft (1.881 m^{2}) (Large)
- Boiler: 4 ft 6 1/4 in (1.38 m) diameter (Small); 5 ft 3 in (1.60 m) diameter (Large)
- Boiler pressure: 175 lbf/in^{2} (1.21 MPa) (Small); 180 psi (1.24 MPa) (Large)
- Heating surface
  - Firebox: 117 sq ft (10.9 m^{2}) (Small); 132 sq ft (12.3 m^{2}) (Large)
  - Tubes: 1,061 sq ft (98.6 m^{2}) (Small); 1,516 sq ft (140.8 m^{2}) (Large)
- Cylinders: Two, inside
- Cylinder size: 18 1/4 in × 26 in (464 mm × 660 mm) (Small); 18 in × 26 in (457 mm × 660 mm) (Large)
- Valve gear: Stephenson
Performance figures
- Tractive effort: 17,891 lbf (79.6 kN) (Small); 17,901 lbf (79.6 kN) (Large)
- Factor of adh.: 3.91 (Small); 4.40 (Large)
Career
- Operators: HR → LMS → BR
- Class: HR: C (Small); U (Large)
- Power class: LMS/BR: 2P
- Numbers: Highland Railway: 1-17, 38, 41, 47 (Small); 61, 63, 66, 68, 60, 62 (later 61, 63-65, 60, 62) (Large); LMS: 14397-14416 (Small); 14417-14422 (Large); BR: 54398, 54399, 54404 (Small)
- Withdrawn: 1931–1953 (small); 1932–1937 (large)
- Disposition: All scrapped

The Highland Railway Ben Class were small 4-4-0 passenger steam locomotives. There were actually two separate 'Ben' classes, usually referred to as the 'Small Bens' and the 'Large Bens'.

== Introduction ==
Despite the large and small tags, there was actually little difference between the two groups, the most crucial being larger boilers with an increase in tube heating surface. Cylinder and wheel dimensions were identical.

The class was originally designed by Peter Drummond, whose elder (and better known) brother Dugald had been in the company's locomotive department in earlier years and was at that time Chief Mechanical Engineer of the London and South Western Railway.

In appearance they were fairly typical Drummond family products with the stiffener across the cab roof. They were also inside cylindered, almost uniquely among HR bogie locomotives.

== Build details ==
=== First batch ===
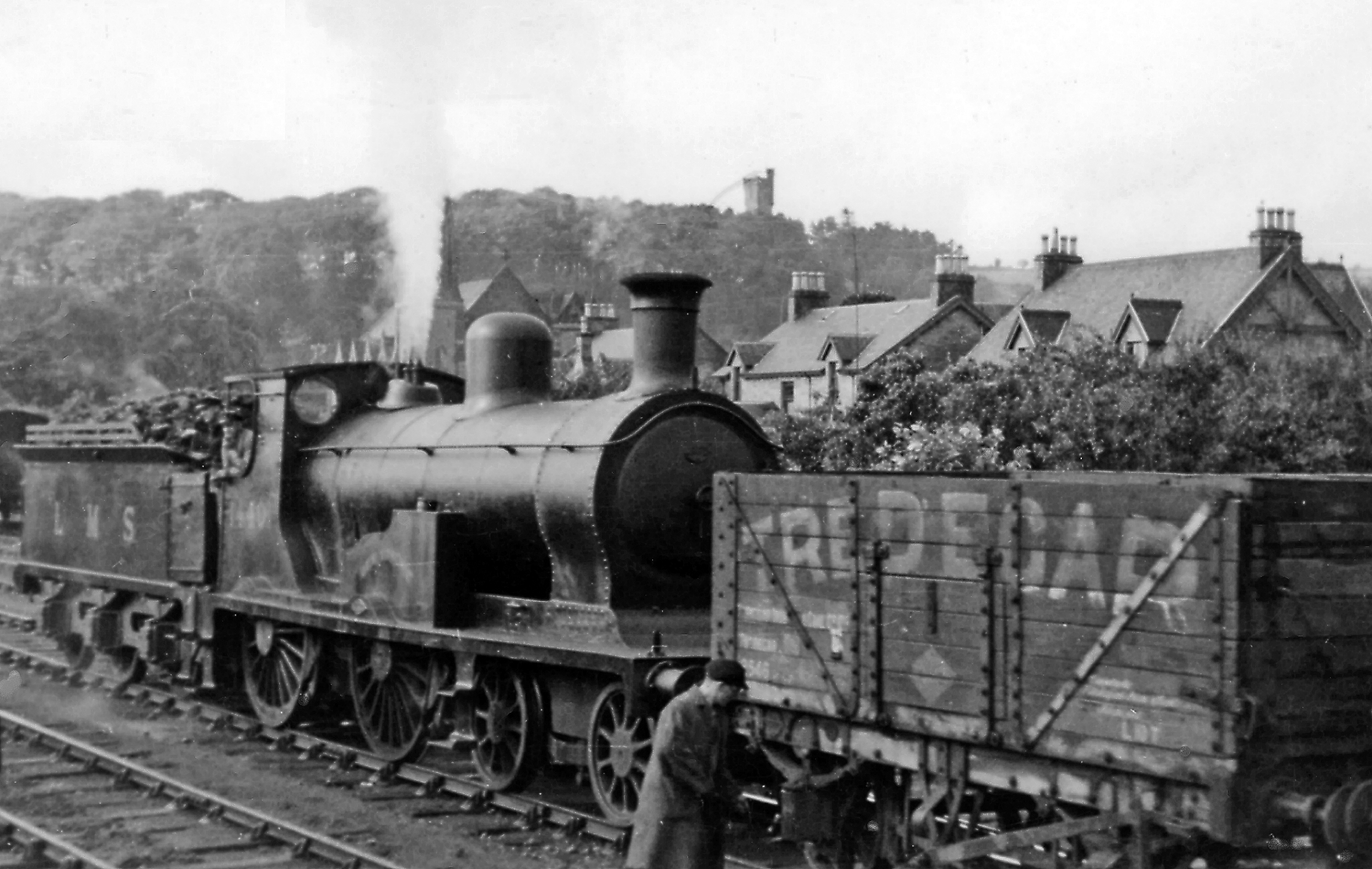
No. 14401 'Ben Vrackie' at Dingwall, 25 August 1948.

The first 8 locomotives were of the Small Ben type and were built by Dübs and Company of Glasgow in the period 1898 to 1899. They were:

HR No.	Name	Manufacturer	Built	Withdrawn	LMS No.	BR No.	Notes
1	Ben-y-Gloe	Dübs & Co. 3685	July 1898	February 1949	14397	54397	Renamed Ben Y’Gloe in 1939. Withdrawn before BR number applied
2	Ben Alder	Dübs & Co. 3686	July 1898	February 1953	14398	54398	Set aside for preservation, but scrapped in 05/1966
3	Ben Wyvis	Dübs & Co. 3687	July 1898	May 1952	14399	54399	
4	Ben More	Dübs & Co. 3688	February 1899	October 1946	14400	—	
5	Ben Vrackie	Dübs & Co. 3689	February 1899	October 1948	14401	54401	Withdrawn before BR number applied
6	Ben Armin	Dübs & Co. 3690	February 1899	December 1939	14402	—	
7	Ben Attow	Dübs & Co. 3691	February 1899	February 1949	14403	54403	Withdrawn before BR number applied
8	Ben Clebrig	Dübs & Co. 3692	February 1899	October 1950	14404	54404	

No. 1 was originally named Ben Nevis for its works portrait, an action that attracted the ire of the board as it was in the territory of a competitor (the North British Railway). It was renamed before entering service.

=== Second batch ===
The Highland Railway built another nine during 1899–1900 at their own Lochgorm works:

HR No.	Name	Built	Withdrawn	LMS No.	BR No.	Notes
9	Ben Rinnes	July 1899	September 1944	14405	—	
10	Ben Slioch	August 1899	July 1947	14406	—	
11	Ben Macdhui	November 1899	December 1931	14407	—	
12	Ben Hope	April 1900	July 1947	14408		
13	Ben Alisky	June 1900	April 1950	14409	54409	Withdrawn before BR number applied
14	Ben Dearg	August 1900	December 1949	14410	54410	Withdrawn before BR number applied
15	Ben Loyal	February 1900	October 1936	14411	—	
16	Ben Avon	February 1901	April 1947	14412	—	
17	Ben Alligan	February 1901	December 1933	14413	—	

=== Third batch ===
Finally, three more were built by the North British Locomotive Company of Glasgow in 1906.

HR No.	Name	NBL Serial	Built	Withdrawn	LMS No.	BR No.	Notes
38	Ben Udlaman	17398	April 1906	December 1933	14414	—	
41	Ben Bhach Ard	17399	July 1906	May 1948	14415	54415	Withdrawn before BR number applied
47	Ben a'Bhuird	17400	July 1906	September 1948	14416	54416	Withdrawn before BR number applied

=== Large Bens ===
In 1908 a larger version appeared, initially four examples from North British Locomotive, with two more the following year

HR No.	Name	NBL serial	Built	Withdrawn	LMS No.	BR No.	Notes
61	Ben na Caillich	18269	May 1908	May 1936	14417	—	Renamed Ben na Caillach in 1926
63	Ben Mheadhoin	18270	May 1908	December 1932	14418	—	
66	Ben Mholach	18271	May 1908	October 1935	14419	—	Renumbered 64 in 1909
68	Ben a'Chait	18272	May 1908	April 1934	14420	—	Renumbered 65 in 1909
60	Ben Breac Mhor	18803	May 1909	October 1932	14421	—	Renamed Ben Bhreac 'Mhor in 1924
62	Ben a'Chaoruinn	18804	May 1909	March 1937	14422	—	Renamed Ben Achaoruinn in 1926, then Ben a'Chaoruinn at unknown date

== Grouping and Nationalisation ==
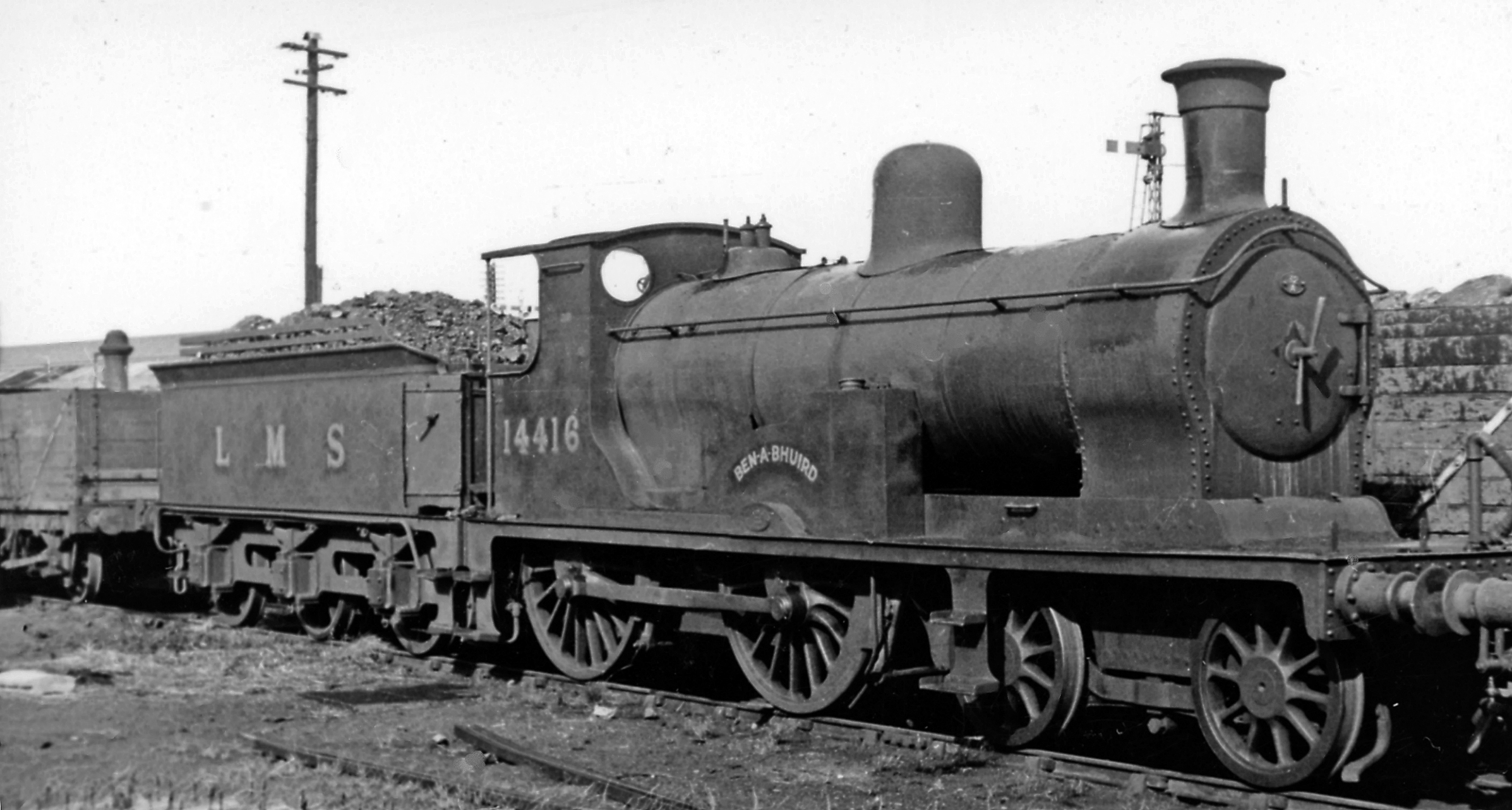
No. 14416 Ben a’Bhuird, 22 August 1948, shortly prior to withdrawal.

All of these locomotives survived to be taken over by the LMS at the Grouping in 1923. The Large Bens were all withdrawn between 1932 and 1937. The first of the Small Bens was withdrawn in 1931, but ten survived into British Railways ownership. The last of these, 54398 Ben Alder, was withdrawn in 1953 and placed in storage in the hope that it would be preserved.

== Preservation attempts and revival ==
Unfortunately, the hopes for 54398 – which included the intention to restore the locomotive to Highland Railway condition – came to nothing, and following storage at various locations (including Boat of Garten) it was eventually cut up on 05/1966; and so, none were preserved. However, a charitable organisation has been formed with the aim of building a working replica of 54398 Ben Alder. But the project was cancelled.
