= North British Locomotive Company =

British locomotive manufacturer, 1903–1962

North British Locomotive Company Limited
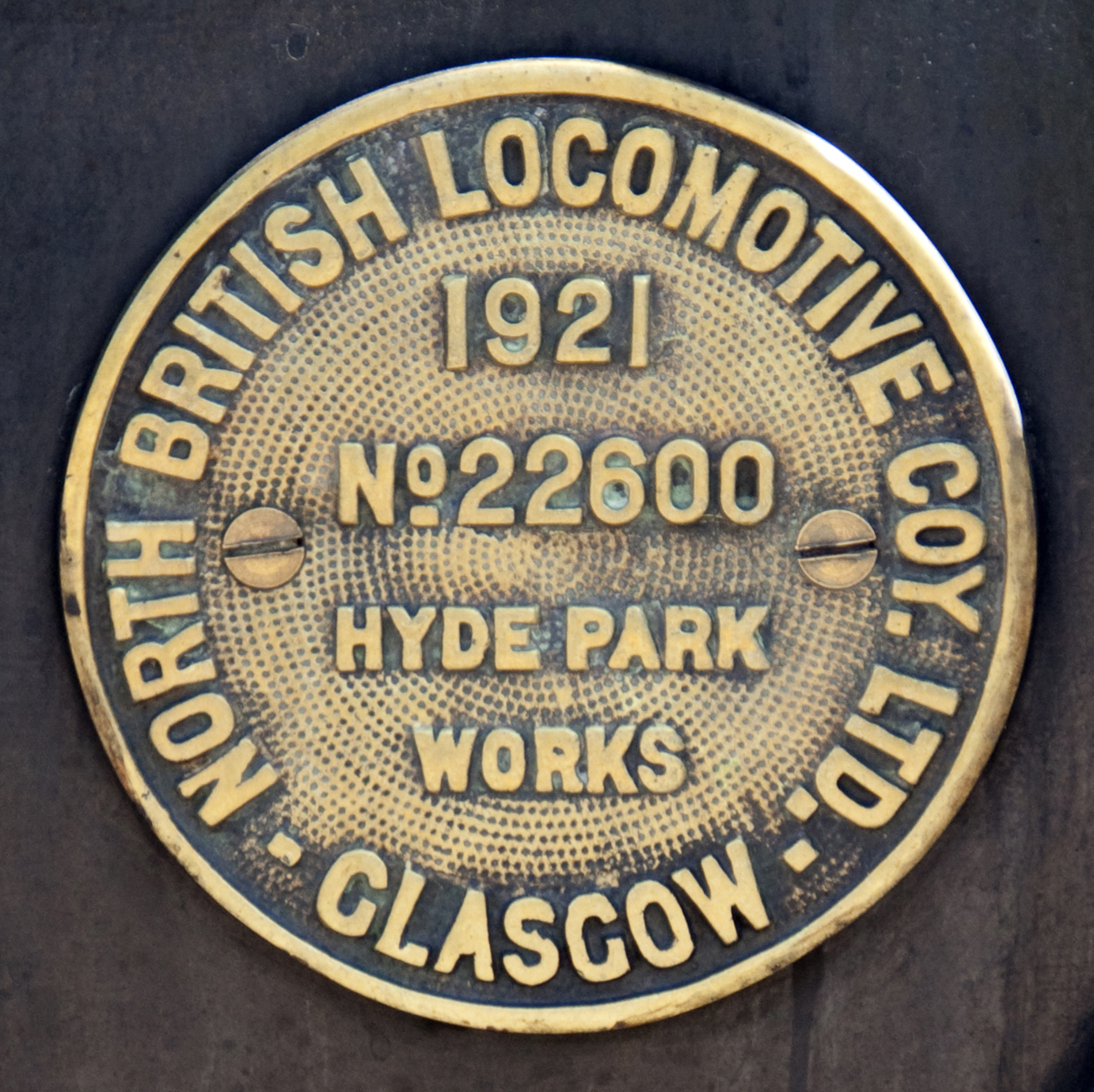
- GNR No. 1744 maker's plate
- Type: Private
- Industry: Rail transport
- Founded: 1903
- Defunct: 1962 (in Liquidation)
- Fate: Assets Liquidated; Goodwill acquired by Andrew Barclay Sons & Co.
- Headquarters: Springburn, Glasgow, Scotland
- Key people: William Lorimer (Chairman); Sir Hugh Reid (Managing Director)
- Products: Locomotives
- Number of employees: 8,000 (1907); 2,658 (1960)

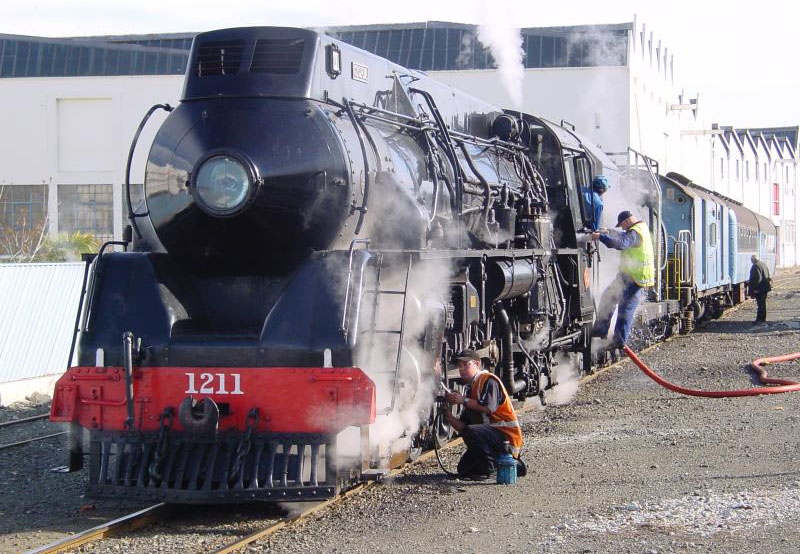
Mainline Steam New Zealand locomotive, NZR J class No. 1211. (NBL 24534 of 1939)

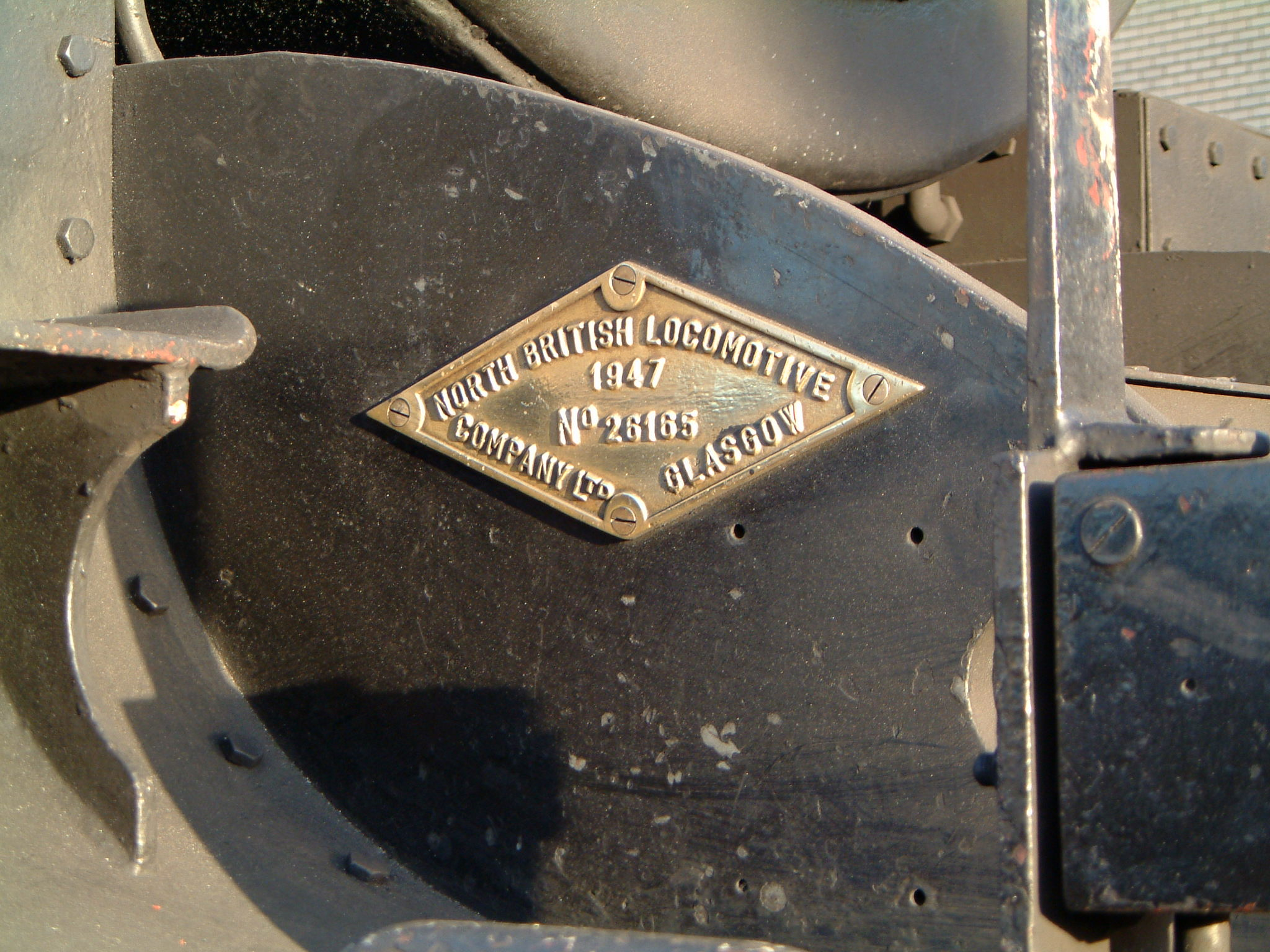
NBL works plate on LNER B1 No. 1264 (NBL 26165 of 1947). The diamond-shaped plate was fitted to locomotives built at the company's Queen's Park Works in Polmadie, a continuation of a tradition started by Dübs and Company.

The North British Locomotive Company (NBL, NB Loco or North British) was created in 1903 through the merger of three Glasgow locomotive manufacturing companies; Sharp, Stewart and Company (Atlas Works), Neilson, Reid and Company (Hyde Park Works) and Dübs and Company (Queens Park Works), creating the largest locomotive manufacturing company in Europe and the British Empire and the second largest in the world after the Baldwin Locomotive Works in the United States.

Its main factories were located at the neighbouring Atlas and Hyde Park Works in central Springburn, as well as the Queens Park Works in Polmadie. A new central Administration and Drawing Office for the combined company was completed across the road from the Hyde Park Works on Flemington Street by James Miller in 1909, later sold to Glasgow Corporation in 1961 to become the main campus of North Glasgow College (now Glasgow Kelvin College).

The two other Railway works in Springburn were St. Rollox railway works, owned by the Caledonian Railway and Cowlairs railway works, owned by the North British Railway. Latterly both works were operated by British Rail Engineering Limited after rail nationalisation in 1948.

In 1918, NBL produced the first prototype of the Anglo-American Mark VIII battlefield tank for the Allied armies, but with the Armistice it did not go into production.

== Steam locomotives ==
NBL built steam locomotives for countries all over the world. This included North America (Canada, Newfoundland), South America (Argentina, Brazil Chile, Paraguay), Europe (France, Greece, Ireland, Italy, Netherlands, Spain, Turkey), Sub-Saharan Africa (Angola, Gold Coast (now Ghana), Kenya/Uganda/Tanzania, Malawi, Rhodesia (now Zimbabwe), South Africa); Middle East (Egypt, Iraq, Palestine), Asia (India, Pakistan, Ceylon (now Sri Lanka), China, Japan, Malaysia, Myanmar, Philippines, Thailand); and Australasia (Australia, New Zealand).

The New South Wales Government Railways purchased numerous North British locomotives, as did the Victorian Railways as late as 1951 (Oberg, Locomotives of Australia). the Western Australian Government Railways also purchased many North British Locomotives, such as the P class. Also the South Australian Railway purchased 15 South Australian Railways R class locos and are known in South Australia as the most versatile South Australian Railway steam locomotive, also the South Australian Railway purchased 10 North British built Victorian Railways N class locos and reclassified them as the South Australian Railways 750 class

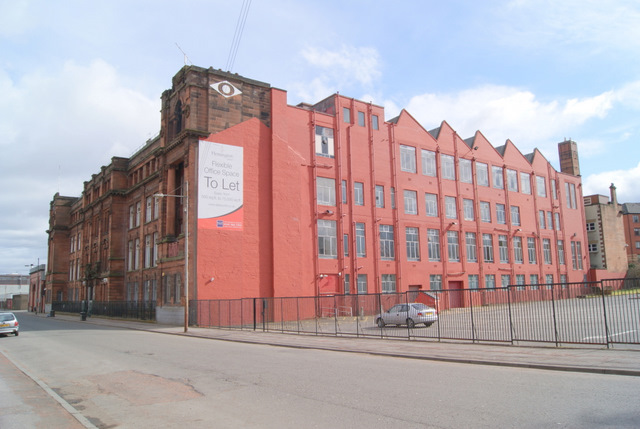
Former headquarters of NBL in Springburn, Glasgow. During World War I the building was temporarily converted into a hospital by the British Red Cross. It was latterly the campus of North Glasgow College.

Between 1903 and 1959, NBL supplied many locomotives of various classes to Egyptian State Railways. They included 40 of the 545 class 2-6-0 in 1928.

Between 1921 and 1925, NBL supplied New Zealand Government Railways with 85 NZR A^{B} class locomotives. The whole fleet of A^{B} class engines numbered 143, as built, of which 141 entered service. Two were lost at sea (see below).

In 1935, NBL supplied six Palestine Railways P class 4-6-0 locomotives to haul main line trains between Haifa and the Suez Canal.

In 1939, NBL supplied 40 4-8-2 locomotives to the New Zealand Railways Department (NZR J class); some of which were later converted to J^{B} class oilburners. In 1951 NBL supplied another 16 J^{A} class, though these did not have the American-style streamlining of the J class. Together with its predecessor firms, North British supplied about a quarter of the steam locomotives used by the NZR.

In 1949, South African Railways bought more than 100 2-8-4 locomotives from NBL and these became the Class 24; some operated tourist trains on the George-Knysna line until 2000. Additionally South Africa also purchased some of its Class 25, 4-8-4 engines from the company between 1953 and 1955. These successful engines with various in-service modifications survived until the end of steam in South Africa in 1992. NBL also introduced the Modified Fairlie locomotive in 1924. In total South Africa purchased over 2,000 locomotives from the North British Locomotive Company.

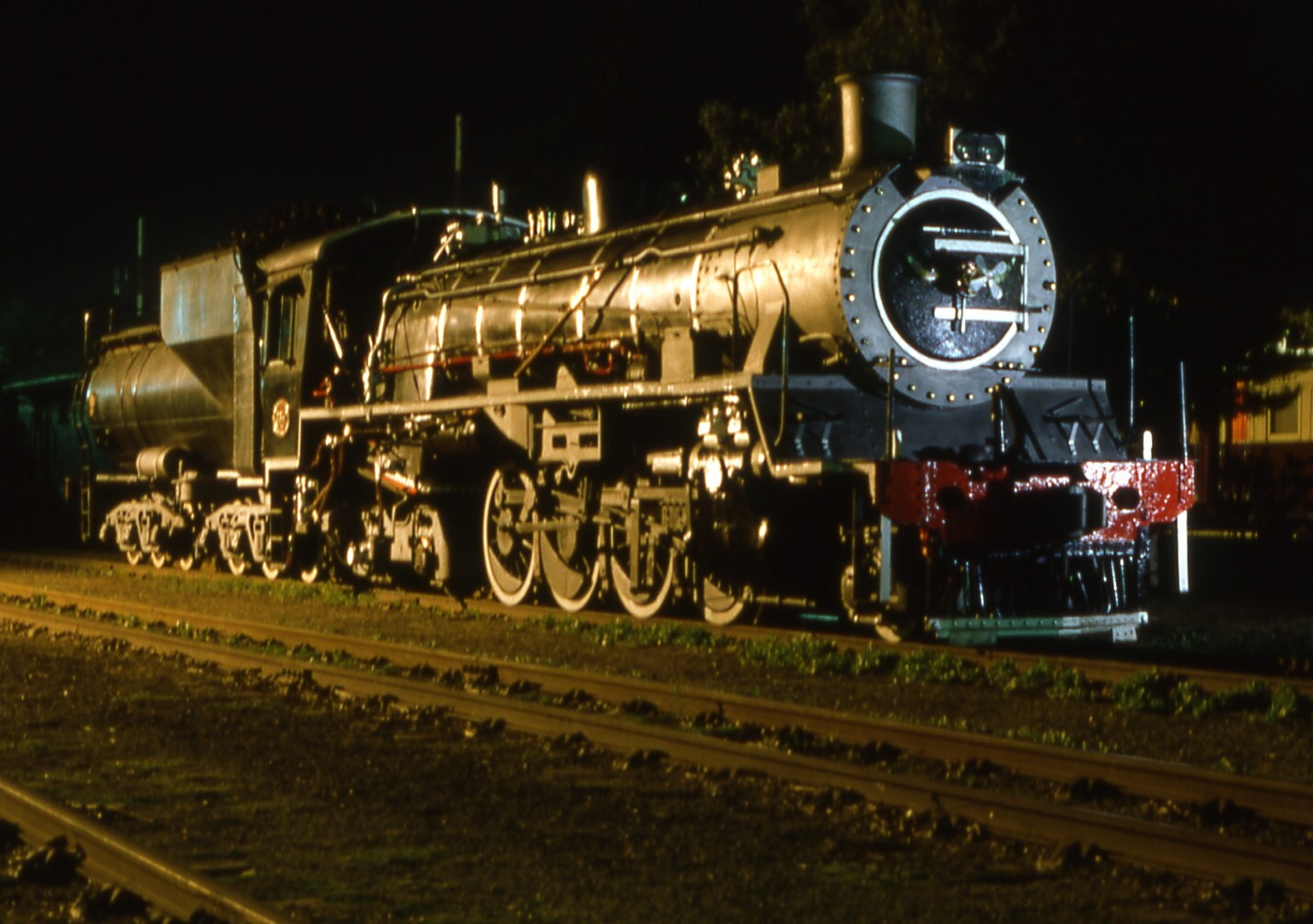
SAR Class 24 3693 (2-8-4) Builder's No. NBL 26405

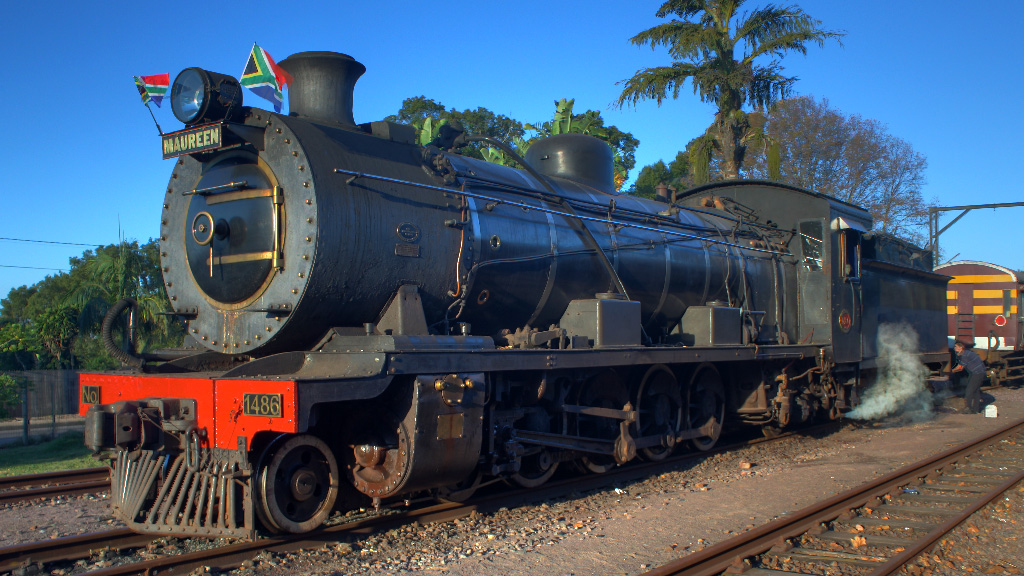
Umgeni Steam Railway 1486 "Maureen"

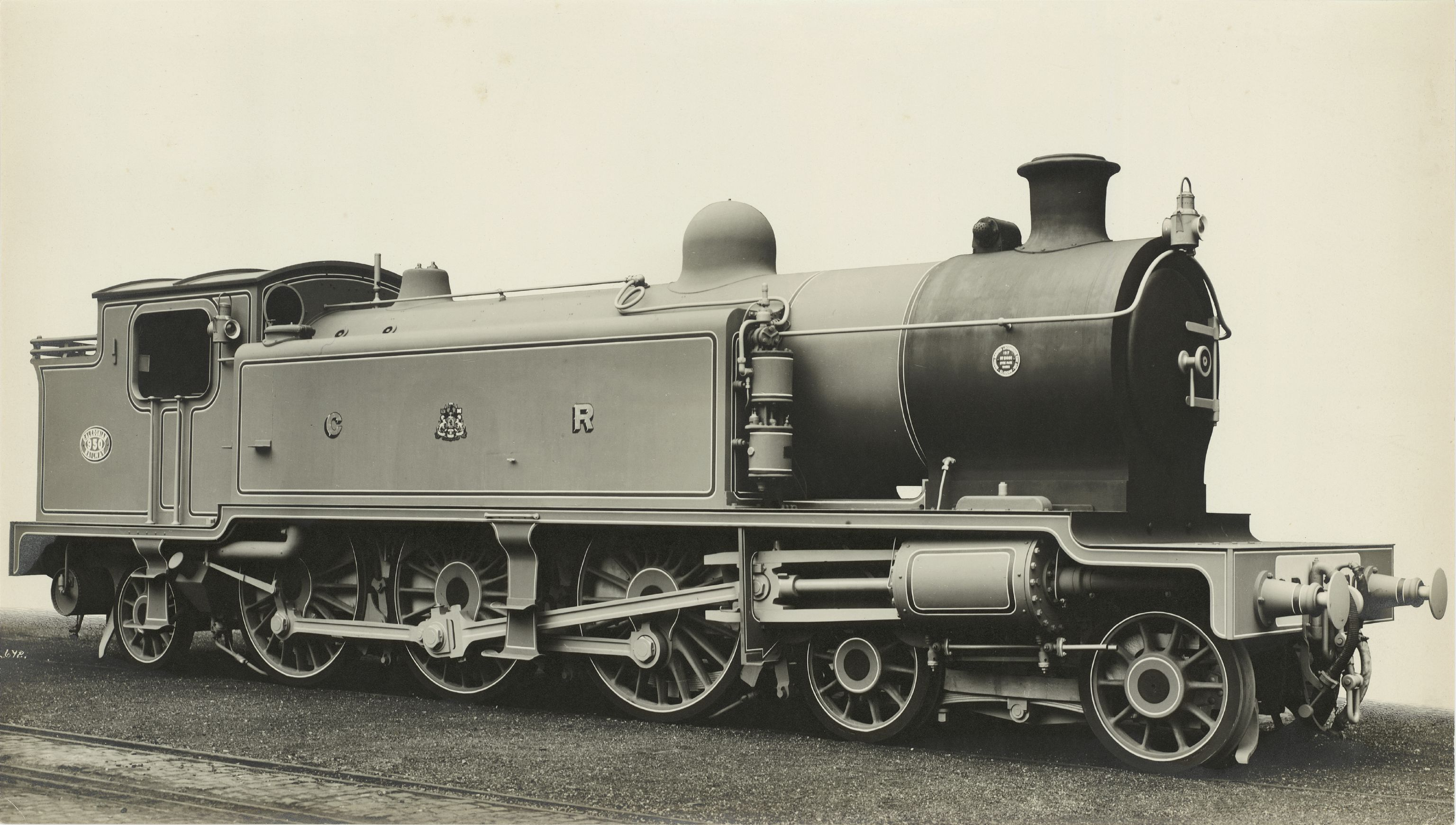
Caledonian Railway 944 Class No. 950

As of January 2010, Umgeni Steam Railway operates SAR Class 3BR engine 1486, (NBL 19690 of 1912) and now named "Maureen", on the line between Kloof and Inchanga, a distance of about 23.5 kilometres (14.6 mi). The locomotive hauls vintage sightseeing trains with some coaches of which date back to 1908.

In 1953, RENFE in Spain acquired 25 2-8-2 locomotives from the North British Locomotive Company. One example, 141F 2111 (Works No. 26975 of 1952) is preserved in working order.

Locomotives made for railways in Ireland included the Great Northern Railway (Ireland) (Q Class); Great Southern and Western Railway (211 class); Midland Great Western Railway (Class B) and Northern Counties Committee (Class U2).

Locomotives made for railways in Britain included the Barry Railway (Class F); Caledonian Railway (72, 113, 944, and 191 classes); Furness Railway (1, 3, 98, and 130 classes); Glasgow and South Western Railway (5, 128 and 403 classes); Great Central Railway classes (8B/8J & 8K); Great North of Scotland Railway (Class F); Great Northern Railway (Classes H3 and O2); Highland Railway (Loch, Ben, New Ben, Castle, K, and X classes); London and North Western Railway (Prince of Wales class); London, Tilbury and Southend Railway (51 and 69 classes); Maryport and Carlisle Railway, Midland and South Western Junction Railway, North British Railway (B, H, J, and L Classes); North Eastern Railway (Class Z); Taff Vale Railway (A class); War Department (ROD 2-8-0). After 1923, customers included the Great Western Railway (5700 class); London, Midland and Scottish Railway (Fowler 3F, Fowler 4F, 4P Compound, Stanier 2-cylinder 2-6-4T, Jubilee, Royal Scot, and Stanier 8F classes, and the experimental Fury); London and North Eastern Railway; (Classes A1, B17, K3, Thompson B1, and Thompson L1); Southern Railway (L1 and N15 King Arthur classes); War Department (Stanier 8F, WD Austerity 2-8-0 and WD Austerity 2-10-0 classes).

== Locomotives 22878, 22879 and 22880 ==
In 1922, the New Zealand Railways Department ordered a batch of its very successful A^{B} class Pacifics from NBL, to be built and shipped as soon as possible. The trio 22878, 22879 and 22880 were built amidst this batch. 22878 and 22879 were loaded aboard SS Wiltshire and it sailed for Auckland, New Zealand, but it got into difficulty at Rosalie Bay, on the east coast of Great Barrier Island and sank. Remnants of both locomotives, and the Wiltshire can be seen on the sea floor.

22880 was dispatched on a subsequent sailing and was put into service in New Zealand as A^{B} class number 745. This locomotive was in service for more than 30 years but then hit a washout near Hāwera. It was then left in the mud for nearly 50 years but has now been exhumed with the intention of restoration. It was moved to the nearby town of Stratford, New Zealand for preservation by Taranaki Flyer Society. Due to the TFS headquarters being sold from under them, 22880 was put on the market, and has been taken into storage by Rimutaka Incline Railway Heritage Trust, after the Taranaki Flyer Society was liquidated in December 2013.

== Diesel locomotives ==
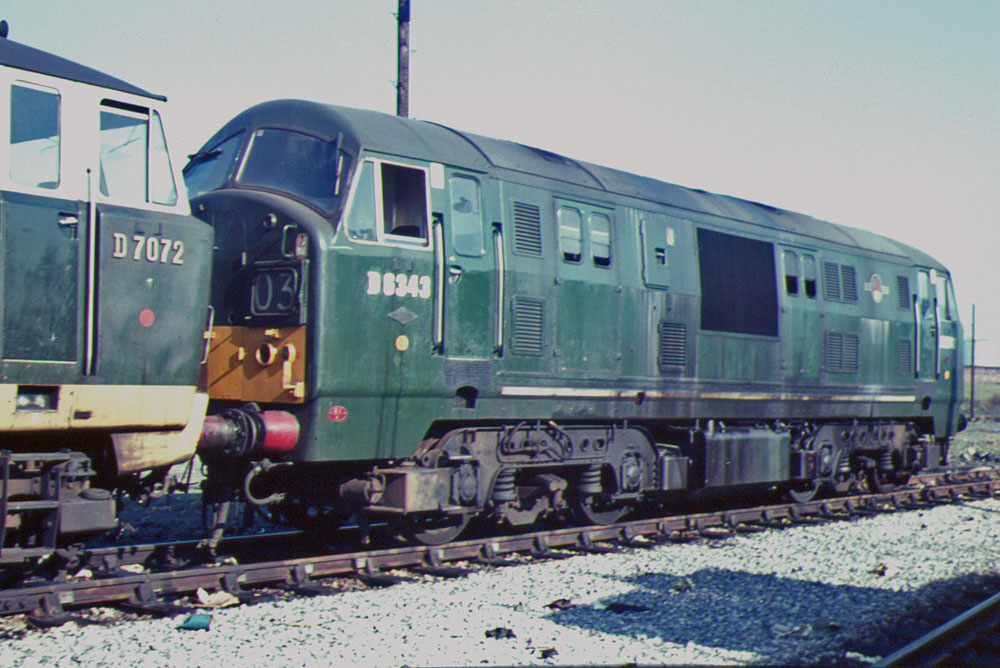
North British Class 22, D6343 (NBL 27916 of 1962), with Hymek D7072 at Old Oak Common, 1965.

Whilst highly successful as designers and builders of steam locomotives for both its domestic market and abroad, North British failed to successfully manage the transition to diesel and electric locomotive production in the wake of the British Railways 1955 Modernisation Plan. It did build a Paxman engined diesel locomotive, British Rail 10800, originally ordered for the London, Midland and Scottish Railway before the 1948 nationalisation of British Railways, but not delivered until 1950. This was closely followed by eight 625-horsepower (466 kW) Bo-Bo diesel-electric locomotives for the Ceylon Government Railway (CGR class G2).

Another Paxman engined locomotive was PVH1, built in 1953 as 'Paxman Voith Hydraulic 1' (hence the identity) for the Emu Bay Railway, Tasmania, and survives today preserved at the Derwent Valley Railway (Tasmania). Its wheel formation is -D- being a hydraulic transmission locomotive, so in appearance it looks like an 0-8-0. It also built eight Paxman engined shunters British Rail Class D2/1.

In the late 1950s, North British signed a deal with the German company MAN to construct further diesel engines under licence. These power units appeared in the late 1950s' British Railways (BR) designs pre-TOPS British Rail Class D3/1 (later D3/4), and later designated Class 21, Class 22, Class 41 and Class 43 (Warship). None of these were particularly successful: constructional shortcomings with the MAN engines made them far less reliable than German-built examples. A typical example of this was the grade of steel used for exhaust manifolds in the Class 43s – frequent manifold failures led to loss of turbocharger drive gas pressure and hence loss of power. More importantly, the driving cabs of the locomotives would fill with poisonous exhaust fumes. BR returned many North British diesel locomotives to their builder for repair under warranty and they also insisted on a three-month guarantee on all repairs (a requirement not levied on its own workshops).

== Electric locomotives ==
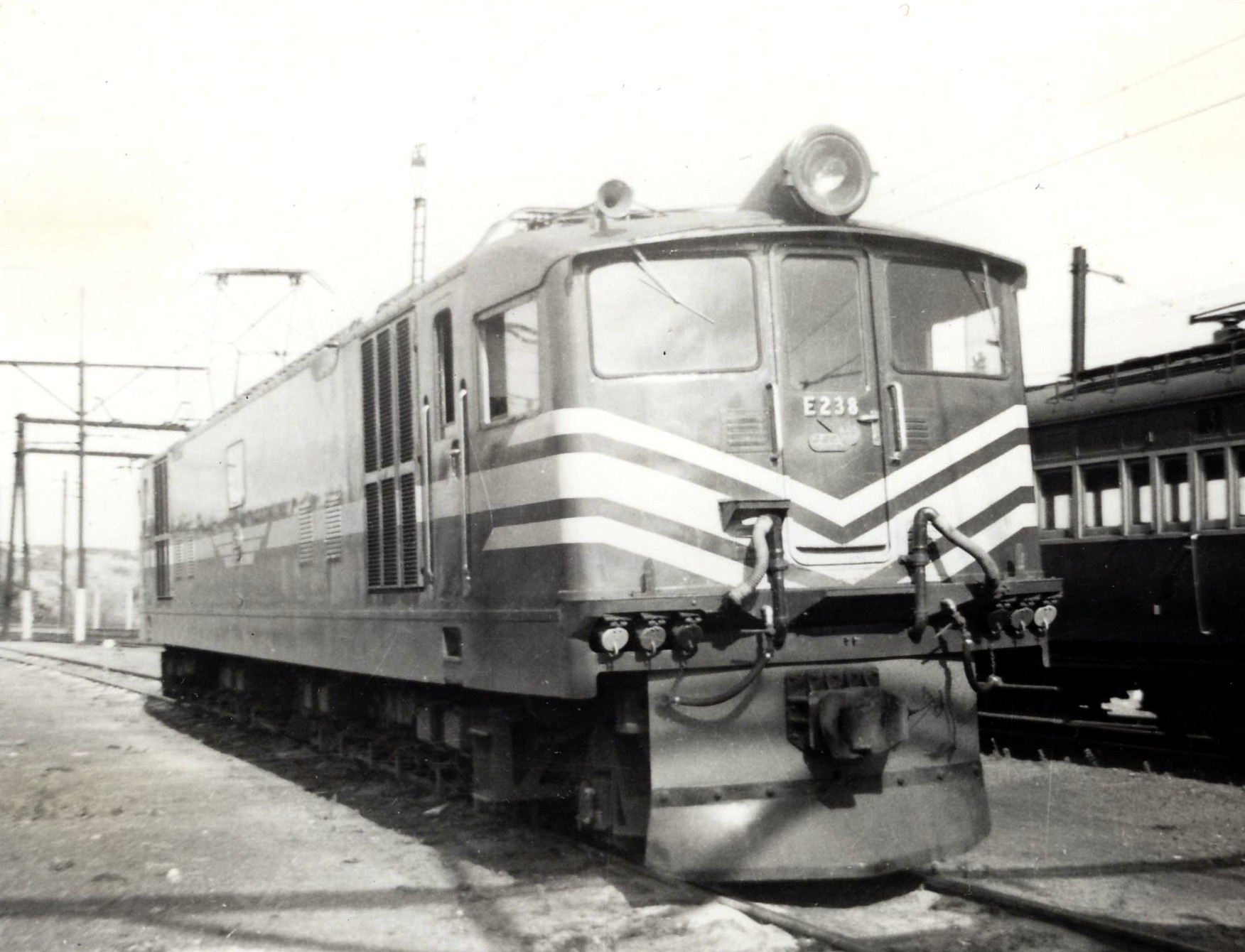
SAR 4E No. E238 in Cape Town, 1966

In the early 1950s, The General Electric Company (GEC) won a contract to build 40 electric locomotives for the South African Railways (SAR Class 4E) – NBL receiving the sub-contract to manufacture the locomotives with GEC-supplied electrical components.

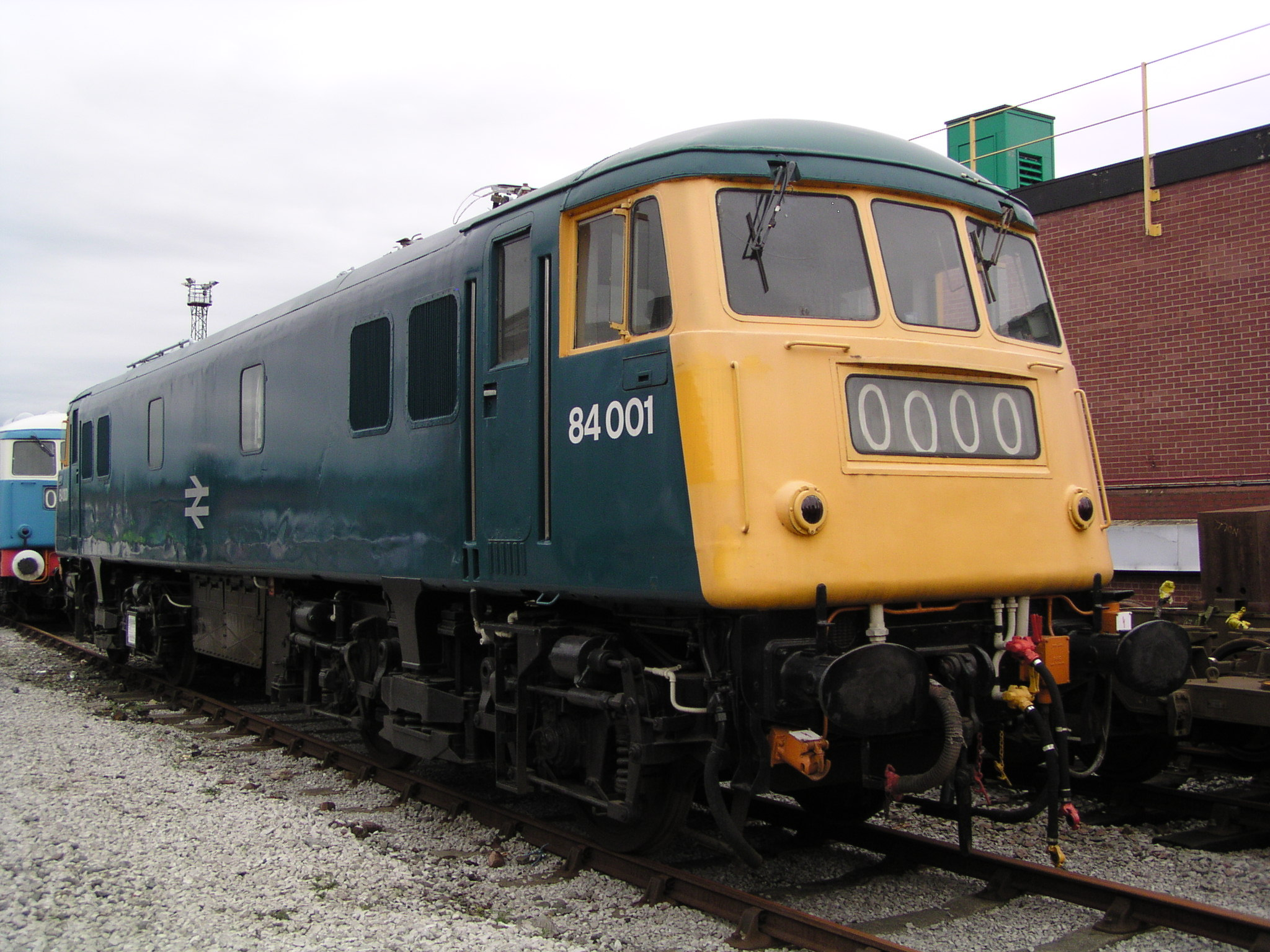
Preserved North British AL4 / Class 84 84001, ex-E3036, (NBL 27793 of 1960) on display at Crewe Works in 2005.

GEC and NBL co-operated again in the construction of early 25 kV AC electric locomotives for the West Coast Main Line (WCML) electrification project of the early 1960s. GEC won a contract for ten locomotives and sub-contracted the mechanical design and construction to NBL: Class AL4 E3036–E3045 (later Class 84 84001–84010) entered traffic in 1960–61. As with its diesel locomotives, the class suffered poor reliability and spent long periods out of service. A partial reprieve came when money was made available to extend the electrification of the WCML north to Glasgow but no immediate funds were available for more electric locomotives. The Class 84s were refurbished in 1972 and pressed back into service, being finally withdrawn between 1978 and 1980 following delivery of Class 87 locomotives.

== Decline ==
In 1959, GEC, Clydesdale Bank and HM Treasury invested in a restructuring programme at North British to enable the transition of the company from steam to diesel-electric and electric locomotive manufacture, centred around production of the Class AL4. Perhaps unwisely, North British supplied many of its diesel and electric locomotives to BR at a loss, hoping to make up for that on massive future orders that never came. That, and the continuing stream of warranty claims to cure design and workmanship faults, proved fatal. North British declared that it was entering voluntary liquidation on 19 April 1962. Because of the unreliability of its UK diesel and electric locomotives, all were withdrawn after comparatively short lifespans. The Atlas works site is now an industrial estate, and the Hyde Park works site is now the campus of North Glasgow College. The Queens Park works site on Aikenhead Road in Polmadie is now given over to a variety of industrial and commercial uses.

== Preservation ==
=== Australia ===
- Several industrial shunters have been preserved, including PVH1 by the Derwent Valley Railway (Tasmania), and number 27654 by the Llanelli & Mynydd Mawr Railway. A number of steam locomotives still exist in Australia, including, some operational Victorian Railways R class 4-6-4 engines, several Dübs engines and Pmr class 4-6-2 locomotives of Western Australia, a Rx class in South Australia.
- Ex South African Railways Class 24 No.3628 is in Cairns, owned by the Mainline Steam Heritage Trust.
- One ROD 2-8-0 J&A Brown 20 (Ex-ROD 1984, North British No 22042) is preserved at the Dorrigo Steam Railway & Museum

=== China ===
- China Railways MG1 No. 035 is on display at the China Railway Museum.

=== France ===
- 7 of the 8 preserved État 140-101 to 140-370's were NBL built and located in different parts of France.

=== Israel ===
- A NBL 8F is at the Beersheba Turkish railway station.
- The tender of one of six Palestine Railways P class built for Palestine Railways in 1935 is preserved at the Israel Railway Museum in Haifa.

=== Japan ===
- JGR Class 2120 No. 2221 is on display at Ome Railway Park.

=== Malaysia ===
- Two North British steam locomotives are preserved: one in the Malaysian Army Museum in Port Dickson and another in Johor Bahru. The locomotive that is in Port Dickson had its name and number changed between "564.21 Selama" and "564.12 Alor Gajah" until it is preserved using the second number and name.
- The first surviving North British steam locomotive in Malaysia is "564.36 Termeloh" which has completed restoration works in Batu Gajah, however it is still inactive and currently preserved in the old Johor Bahru railway station as most of KTMB's driving crew have no training or experience on operating it.
- The other surviving locomotive undergoing restoration is "564.25 Kuala Lumpur", in Seremban for heritage train services in Malaysia. This locomotive was originally a preserved monument in Butterworth and later Bukit Mertajam before being restored.

=== New Zealand ===
NBR number	Year	Original operator	Class	Wheel arrangement	Road number	Location	Owner	Notes
22878	1922		A^{B}	4-6-2	732			Cargo on Wiltshire, sea floor off Great Barrier Island. Part of dive wreck
22879	1922		A^{B}	4-6-2	762			Cargo on Wiltshire, sea floor off Great Barrier Island. Part of dive wreck
22880	1922	New Zealand Railways	A^{B}	4-6-2	745	Maymorn, New Zealand		See section for Locomotives 22878, 22879 and 22880, above.
23190	1925	New Zealand Railways	A^{B}	4-6-2	832	Glenbrook Vintage Railway	MOTAT	Stored, pending restoration.
24534	1939	New Zealand Railways	J	4-8-2	1211	Parnell	Mainline Steam	Preserved with streamlining.
24557	1939	New Zealand Railways	J	4-8-2	1234	Paekākāriki	Steam Incorporated	Stored, awaiting overhaul.
24559	1939	New Zealand Railways	J^{B}	4-8-2	1236	Plimmerton	Mainline Steam	Mainline Certified. Converted to oil-burner, 2001.
27104	1951	New Zealand Railways	J^{A}	4-8-2	1275	Parnell	Mainline Steam	Certified for mainline running. Built as oil burner.
27368	1953	South African Railways	25NC	4-8-4	3508	Parnell	Mainline Steam	Shipped to New Zealand, 1997. In storage at Parnell.
27787	1958	South African Railways	GMAM	4-8-2+2-8-4	4135	Hermanstad	Mainline Steam	REGM's third no. R14 Cherrie. Awaiting shipping to New Zealand. Built by North British on subcontract to Beyer Peacock for SAR.
27788	1958	South African Railways	GMAM	4-8-2+2-8-4	4136	Bloemfontein	Mainline Steam	REGM's no. R12 Barbara. Built by North British on subcontract to Beyer Peacock for SAR.

=== Northern Ireland ===
- NCC Class U2 74 Dunluce Castle is on display at the Ulster Folk and Transport Museum.

=== South Africa ===
- A 2-8-4 SAR Class 24, No. 3664 (North British build no. 26386 of 1949), affectionately called Jo-Anna, used to perform regular tourist trips in and around Pretoria and one NBL built GEC Class 4E electric is being preserved at Bellville Depot in Cape Town.
  - The Outeniqua Choo Tjoe used to use Class 24 locomotives
  - Atlantic Rail used to perform trips with SAR Class 24 No. 3655 in Cape Town
- Mainline Steam have in storage in South Africa the following:
  - 26052, 19D 3332, stored at Bloemfontein.
  - 27787, GMAM 4135, is stored for sale at the Wonder Trains yard in Hermanstad, South Africa.

=== United Kingdom ===
- LMR 600 Gordon a 2-10-0 design for the War Department survives on the Severn Valley Railway
- About 21 North British diesel shunters are preserved, mostly by public museums or by preservation societies on heritage railways in the UK, e.g. the Scottish Railway Preservation Society (SRPS) Diesel Group owns D2767 and returned this to working order on 25 June 2008. A list of these with information and photos can be found on the World of Preserved Shunters web site .
- G&SWR 5 Class 0-6-0T No. 5 (works number 21521) of 1917, preserved at the Riverside Museum
- GNSR F Class 4-4-0 No. 49 'Gordon Highlander' (works number 22563) of 1920, preserved at the Bo'ness and Kinneil Railway
- The only surviving North British main-line electric locomotive is Class 84 84001.
- A 2 ft 6 in (762 mm) gauge North British 4-6-2 steam locomotive belongs to the Vale of Rheidol Railway Museum Collection. It is not currently on public display.
- South African Class 15F 4-8-2 steam locomotive, No.3007 -is exhibited in Glasgow's Riverside museum.
- 0-4-0DH W6W Type "Cadbury No.11" 27814 of 1958.. Sold to Gun Range Farm Scrapyard, Shilton, Coventry, August 1988. Still there in April 2001.
- 0-4-0DH W6W Type "Cadbury No. 12" 27490 of 1959. Sold to Gun Range Farm Scrapyard, Shilton, Coventry, August 1988. Still there in April 2001.
- 0-4-0DH W6W Type "Cadbury No. 15" 28038 of 1961. Transferred to North British Maritime Ships of Hull, West Glamorgan by 1987. Stored at Britton Ferry (Shipping Services) by 1999. In working order but out of use. Acquired by P.J. Manison of Swansea in April 2001.

== See also ==
- Category:NBL locomotives
