= Peter Drummond (engineer) =

Peter Drummond (1850–1918) was a Scottish Locomotive Superintendent with the Highland Railway from 1896 to 1911 and with the Glasgow and South Western Railway from 1912 to 1918. He was the younger brother of the engineer Dugald Drummond.

== Locomotives ==
Locomotives designed by Peter Drummond include:

- Highland Railway Castle Class 4-6-0 passenger engine
- Highland Railway Drummond 0-6-0 Class goods engine
- Highland Railway Drummond 0-6-4T Class banking engine
- Highland Railway L Class 4-4-0 passenger engine
- Highland Railway Ben Class 4-4-0 passenger engine
- G&SWR 'Austrian Goods' 2-6-0

Business positions
Preceded by David Jones	Chief Mechanical Engineer of the Highland Railway; 1896-1911	Succeeded by Fredrick George Smith
Preceded by James Manson	Chief Mechanical Engineer of the Glasgow and South Western Railway; 1912–1918	Succeeded by Robert Harben Whitelegg
