= Locomotives of the Highland Railway =

Scottish locomotives

The locomotives of the Highland Railway were used by the Highland Railway to operate its lines in the north of Scotland. The Highland Railway locomotive works was at Lochgorm, Inverness. The works had been built about 1855 by the Inverness and Nairn Railway. The locomotive classes are listed under the names of the railway's Locomotive Superintendents.

== Locomotives ==
=== William Barclay 1855–69 ===
During Barclay's incumbency as locomotive superintendent various 2-2-2 and 2-4-0 locomotives were built, along with a solitary 0-4-0T. An 0-4-0ST was also inherited from the Findhorn Railway. Many of Barclay's locomotives would later be rebuilt by Stroudley or Jones - most of the 2-2-2s ended up as 2-4-0s and one became a 2-2-2T, a pair of 2-4-0s became 4-4-0s and the 0-4-0T became an 0-4-2T. Only 4 much rebuilt Barclay locomotives (all 2-4-0s) were still in stock at the time of the Grouping.

=== William Stroudley 1865–69 ===
William Stroudley produced only one new design, an 0-6-0ST of which 3 were built. These survived to pass into LMS ownership.

Class	Drummond class	Type	Quantity	Manufacturer	Date	HR Nos.	LMS power classification	LMS Nos.	Withdrawn	Notes
Lochgorm Tanks	R	0-6-0ST	3	Lochgorm Works	1869–74	56–57, 49	0P	16118–119, 16383	1926-1932	

=== David Jones 1870–96 ===
David Jones designed several classes of 4-4-0, and was also notable for introducing the 4-6-0 wheel arrangement to the UK. He also produced small numbers of 0-4-4ST, 2-4-0, 2-4-0T and 4-4-0T locomotives. Of 88 engines built to Jones' design (including 3 built as late as 1917), 74 passed to the LMS in 1923. A small 2-4-0T purchased secondhand from the Duke of Sutherland also made into LMS ownership.

Class	Drummond class	Type	Quantity	Manufacturer	Date	HR Nos.	LMS power classification	LMS Nos.	Withdrawn	Notes
'Duke'	F	4-4-0	17	Dübs & Co. (10); Lochgorm Works (7)	1874–88	60–69, 31, 71–75, 84			1907-1923	
'Raigmore'	H	2-4-0	2	Lochgorm Works	1877	29–30	—	—	1910-1912	
'Jones tank'	O	4-4-0T	3	Lochgorm Works	1878–79	17, 58–59	—	15010–15012	1928-1933	Built as 2-4-0T
'Skye Bogie'	L	4-4-0	9	Lochgorm Works	1882–1901		1P	14277, 14279–14285	1922-1930	
'Bruce' or 'Clyde Bogie'	E	4-4-0	8	Clyde Locomotive Company	1886	76–83	1P	14278	1923-1930	
13	S	0-4-4ST	1	Lochgorm Works	1890	13	0P	15050	1929	
'Strath'	D	4-4-0	12	Neilson & Co.	1892	89–100	1P	14271–14276	1923-1930	
'Yankee tank'	P	4-4-0T	5	Dübs & Co.	1892–93	11,14-15,101-102	0P	15013–15017	1924-1934	First 2 were built for Uruguay Eastern Railway
'Big Goods' or 'Jones Goods'	I	4-6-0	15	Sharp, Stewart & Co.	1894	103–117	4F	17916–17930	1929-1940	
'Loch'	B	4-4-0	18	Dübs & Co. (15); North British Loco. Co. (3)	1896–1917	119–133, 70–72	2P	14379–14396	1930-1950	
118	T	2-4-0T	1	Kitson & Co.	1871	118			1923	Purchased from Duke of Sutherland in 1895

=== Peter Drummond 1896–1912 ===
Under Peter Drummond, new 0-4-4T, 0-6-0T, 0-6-4T, 0-6-0, 4-4-0 and 4-6-0 designs emerged. All 72 locomotives passed to the LMS.

Class	Type	Quantity	Manufacturer	Date	HR Nos.	LMS power classification	LMS Nos.	Withdrawn	Notes
C ('Small Ben')	4-4-0	20	Dübs & Co. (8); Lochgorm Works (9); North British Loco. Co. (3)	1898–1906	1–17, 38, 41, 47	2P	14397–14416	1931-1953	
K ('Barney')	0-6-0	12	Dübs & Co. (10); North British Loco. Co. (2)	1900–07	134–139, 18–21	3F	17693–17704	1936-1952	
A ('Castle')	4-6-0	19	Dübs & Co. (10); North British Loco. Co. (9)	1900–17	26–30, 35, 50, 58–59, 140–149	3P	14675–14693	1930-1947	
V	0-6-0T	3	Lochgorn Works	1903–04	22–24	2F	16380–16382	1930-1934	
W	0-4-4T	4	Lochgorn Works	1905–06	25, 40, 45–46	0P	15051–15054	1930-1957	BR no. 55053 was the last ex-Highland Railway locomotive in service (withdrawn in January 1957)
U ('Large Ben')	4-4-0	6	North British Loco. Co.	1908–09	60–63, 66, 68	2P	14417–14422	1932-1937	
X ('Banking Tank')	0-6-4T	8	North British Loco. Co.	1909–12	29, 31, 39, 42, 44, 64–65, 69	4P	15300–15307	1932-1936	

=== Frederick George Smith 1912–15 ===
Fredrick George Smith's brief tenure was cut short by a dispute over his sole design, the 'River' Class 4-6-0. Six locomotives were built, but they were (wrongly) considered to be too heavy for the Highland Railway, and were sold to the Caledonian Railway without being used.

Class	Type	Quantity	Manufacturer	Date	HR Nos.	LMS power classification	LMS Nos.	Withdrawn	Notes
'River'	4-6-0	6	Hawthorn Leslie	1915	(70–75)	4P	(14756–14761)	1939-1946	sold to Caledonian Railway before use

=== Christopher Cumming 1915–22 ===
Christopher Cumming designed one class of 4-4-0 and two types of 4-6-0, totalling 18 locomotives, which all passed to the LMS.

Class	Type	Quantity	Manufacturer	Date	HR Nos.	LMS power classification	LMS Nos.	Withdrawn	Notes
'Snaigow'	4-4-0	2	Hawthorn Leslie	1917	73–74	3P	14522–14523	1935-1936	named Snaigow and Durn
'Clan Goods'	4-6-0	8	Hawthorn Leslie	1918–19	75-82	5F	17950–17957	1946-1952	
'Clan'	4-6-0	8	Hawthorn Leslie	1919–21	49, 51-57	4P	14762–14769	1943-1950	Some names reused on BR Standard Class 6

== London, Midland and Scottish Railway ==
The Highland Railway was absorbed by the London, Midland and Scottish Railway (LMS) in 1923 and its locomotives were taken into LMS stock. Despite their small numbers, quite a few Highland Railway classes survived well into the LMS era, and even into the 1950s.

== Preservation ==
Image	HR No.	HR Class	Type	Manufacturer	Serial No.	Date	Notes
	103	Jones Goods	4-6-0	Sharp, Stewart & Co.	4022	September; 1894	On static display at the Riverside Museum

There are also plans to build a replica of Ben Class 54398 Ben Alder.
