= Highland Railway – Jones locomotives =

David Jones (1834–1906) was locomotive superintendent of the Highland Railway between 1870 and 1896. He was credited with the design of the first British 4-6-0, which was strongly influenced by the Scottish locomotive design for Indian Railways. The 4-6-0 wheel arrangement that appeared in 1894, quickly became the most common locomotive for main line passenger and mixed traffic work in Britain.

Although Jones was a fervent disciple of Alexander Allan, Jones' new designs tended to break away from the Allan tradition, which had lasted so long in Scotland. One Allan feature that Jones did not perpetuate in his 4-6-0s was double framing around the outside cylinders. Allan's straight-link valve gear was, however, retained; this was basically similar to the corresponding Stephenson gear, but the link was easier and therefore cheaper to make and imparted a constant lead irrespective of cut-off. The "Drummond" Castle class was, mechanically, Jones’ personal design, although the Drummond stamp of chimney, cab and 'water-cart' bogie tender was unmistakable. A dubious asset, without which none of the younger Drummond's locomotives was complete, was the provision of a reversing gear, a troublesome mechanism if it were not well maintained.

With the introduction of the 4-6-0, Highland Railway had thus obviated the 0-6-0 type employed by practically every other British railway, except its most intense competitor, the Great North of Scotland Railway. A 0-6-0, however, would have meant a crank axle, and crank axles did not have a place in Jones' designs.

Jones’ new designs also tended to break away from the Allan tradition, although he continued to use the Allan link valve gear.

== Jones locomotive designs ==
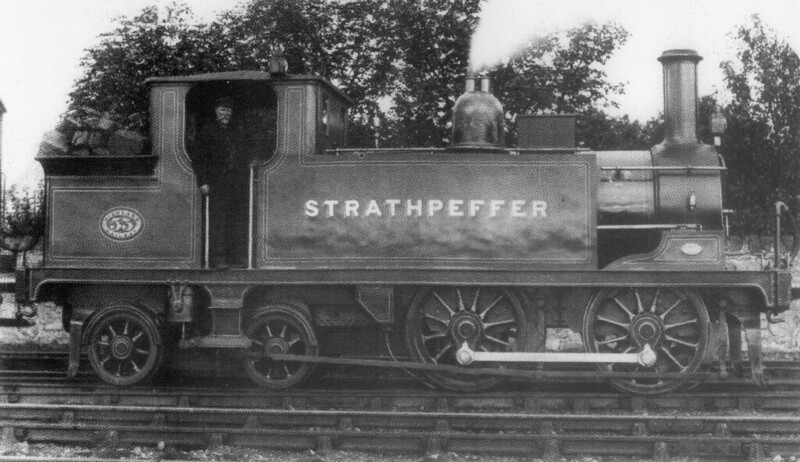
No. 53 Strathpeffer, as running between October 1901 and May 1903

- F class 4-4-0 of 1874–1888
- Two 2-4-0 locomotives built at Inverness in 1877. These had 6 ft 3 in driving wheels, 16 in by 22 in outside cylinders and 4 ft 1 in diameter boilers with a working pressure of 140 psi. Originally numbered 1 'Raigmore' and 3 'Ballindalloch', they were renumbered 29 and 30 in 1898, and were withdrawn in 1910 and 1912 respectively.
- O class 2-4-0T of 1878–79
- L class 4-4-0 of 1882–1901
- E class 4-4-0 of 1886
- One 0-4-4 saddle-tank was built at Inverness in 1890 for service on the Strathpeffer branch. Originally numbered 13 and named 'Strathpeffer', it had 4 ft 3 in coupled wheels, 14 in by 20 in inside cylinders, a 3 ft 6.5 in diameter boiler, and a weight in working order of 32 tons. In 1901 the locomotive was rebuilt by Drummond as a side-tank engine, in which form it was renumbered 53. In 1903 it was renamed 'Lybster' and transferred to that branch. It passed to LMS ownership in 1923.
- Strath class 4-4-0 of 1892
- P class 4-4-0T of 1893
- Jones Goods 4-6-0 of 1894
- The Loch class 4-4-0 of 1896–1917 had a very high power/weight ratio and was among the several classes carrying his special louvered chimney. This invention involved the division of the chimney into a central exhaust tube and an outer concentric ring into which air was projected through the louver slits down the front of the chimney casing. The increase in air resistance was induced by deflector plates. By this means, a draught was supplied when the engine was running with its steam cut off, as happened for long stretches on the hilly Highland line.

== Yankee tanks ==
In 1892, the opportunity was taken to purchase two 4-4-0T engines which had been built by Dübs and Company for the Uruguay Eastern Railway but not delivered due to a financial hitch. These were known as the Yankee tanks.

== Dunrobin ==
When the Far North Line opened to Golspie in 1871, the 3rd Duke of Sutherland had purchased a small 2-4-0T from Kitson and Company for his private train. Named Dunrobin, it had 4 ft driving wheels, 10 in by 18 in outside cylinders, and weighed 21 tons in working order. On his succession, the 4th Duke decided to have a new locomotive built, and the original Dunrobin was sold to the Highland Railway in 1895. It was rebuilt in 1896 with a larger boiler and cylinders. The Highland Railway numbered it 118 and named it Gordon Castle' for use on the Fochabers branch. Later it was renamed Invergordon and used as a shunter in that town, where it survived until just after the Grouping.

The Duke's new locomotive was an 0-4-4T designed by Jones and built by Sharp, Stewart and Company in 1895. Also named Dunrobin, it had 4 ft 6 in driving wheels and 13 in by 18 in inside cylinders.
