= Highland Railway Classes prior to 1870 =

The Highland Railway began as the Inverness and Nairn Railway (later the Inverness and Aberdeen Junction Railway), which operated the other lines which became part of the Highland Railway on its formation in 1865. For post-1870 locomotives, see Locomotives of the Highland Railway.

== Initial locomotive designs ==
=== William Barclay ===
The first locomotive superintendent was William Barclay, who was a nephew of Alexander Allan. The locomotives supplied initially were classic Allan designs, small 2-2-2s and 2-4-0s, outside cylindered and with external framing and (initially at least) not even a weatherboard to protect the enginemen. It was later decided that a cab was essential to protect them from winter weather. Only four of the Barclay era locomotives, all rebuilt by Jones, were still in service at the time of the Grouping in 1923.

==== Raigmore class ====
The first locomotives were two 2-2-2s were supplied by Hawthorns and Company of Leith in 1855, and a second pair delivered in 1857. Cylinder dimensions were 15 by 20 inches (381 by 508 mm), and driving wheel diameters were 6 feet 0 inches (1,829 mm). The boiler pressure was originally 100 psi (6.9 bar; 690 kPa), later being revised to 120 psi (8.3 bar; 830 kPa).

They were:

| HR number | Name |
|---|---|
| 1 | Raigmore |
| 2 | Aldourie |
| 3 | St Martins |
| 4 | Ardross |

In around 1869, nos. 3 and 4 were scrapped, and their driving wheels were used by Stroudley to rebuild nos. 1 and 2 as 2-4-0s. No. 1 was withdrawn within a few years, but no. 2 received a more extensive rebuild, gaining a larger boiler and 15.5-by-22-inch (394 by 559 mm) cylinders, and lasted until 1899.

==== Seafield class ====
A batch of seven 2-4-0s with 16 in × 22 in (406 mm × 559 mm) bore x stroke cylinders and 5-foot-0-inch (1,524 mm) driving wheels were supplied by Hawthorns between 1858 and 1859 for goods service. Boiler pressure was originally 100 pounds per square inch (6.9 bar; 690 kPa), later increased to 120 pounds per square inch (8.3 bar; 830 kPa).

| HR number | Name |
|---|---|
| 5 | Seafield |
| 6 | Bruce |
| 7 | Fife |
| 8 | Altyre |
| 9 | Aultnaskiah |
| 10 | Westhall |
| 11 | Stafford |

In 1873 Jones rebuilt no. 10 as a 4-4-0 to counter flange wear problems on the Dingwall & Skye line. He used the Adams bogie arrangement and replaced the cylinders with new ones of 17 and 24 in (432 and 610 mm) bore and stroke. This engine was effectively the prototype for the F Class built from 1874 onwards. In 1875 a second locomotive (no. 7) was similarly rebuilt, although this seems to have been a trial for new features adopted for the Skye bogies. The other 5 locomotives of this batch remained as 2-4-0s but were rebuilt with cabs and longer (24 in or 610 mm stroke) cylinders between 1875 and 1880. All were withdrawn between 1893 and 1899.

==== Belladrum class ====
A pair of 2-2-2s with 16-by-22-inch (406 mm × 559 mm) cylinders was supplied by Hawthorns in 1862. Driving wheels were 6 foot 0 inches, boiler pressure was originally 100 lb/square inch, later increased to 120 lb/square inch. They were the first locomotives supplied with cabs from new.

| HR number | Name |
|---|---|
| 12 | Belladrum |
| 13 | Lovat |

No. 13 was withdrawn in 1890. In 1871 no. 12 was rebuilt by Jones as a 2-2-2T for branch line work, in which form it survived until 1898.

==== 14 class ====
Two 2-4-0s were supplied by Hawthorns in 1862. They were similar to but slightly larger than the earlier batch, and were fitted with cabs from new. They were:

| HR number | Name |
|---|---|
| 14 | Loch |
| 15 | Sutherland |

Later they were rebuilt with 17-by-24-inch (432 mm × 610 mm), bore x stroke, cylinders and 5-foot-2.5-inch (1,588 mm) driving wheels. No. 15 was withdrawn in 1893, while no. 14 lasted until 1901 (having been renumbered 6 and then 49).

==== Findhorn railway ====
In 1862 the Findhorn Railway was taken over, along with its sole locomotive, a Neilson and Company 0-4-0ST locomotive dating from 1860. It had 3-foot-6-inch (1,067 mm) wheels and 12-by-16-inch (305 mm × 406 mm) cylinders.

| HR number | Name |
|---|---|
| 16 | Findhorn (name not confirmed) |

It was sold to a contractor in 1872.

==== Needlefield Tank ====
A small 0-4-0T was built by Hawthorns in 1863 for the Burghead branch line. It had 4-foot (1,219 mm) driving wheels and 13-by-18-inch (330 mm × 457 mm) inside cylinders.

| HR number | Name |
|---|---|
| 17 | Hopeman |

As built, it proved to be rather unstable and was therefore converted to an 0-4-2T by Stroudley. It later became a stationary engine to power the Lochgorm works sawmill. It returned to traffic as no. 1A in 1898, and was finally withdrawn in 1902.

==== Small and Medium Goods ====
Ten 2-4-0s were supplied by Sharp, Stewart and Company in 1863. They had 17-by-22-inch (432 mm × 559 mm) cylinders, 150 psi (1,000 kPa) boilers and 5-foot-1.5-inch (1,562 mm) driving wheels.

| HR number | Name |
|---|---|
| 18 | Inverness |
| 19 | Dingwall |
| 20 | Birnam |
| 21 | Forres |
| 22 | Aviemore |
| 23 | Murthly |
| 24 | Invergordon |
| 25 | Novar |
| 26 | Beauly |
| 27 | Conon |

The next year, Sharp, Stewart supplied ten more, with the stroke increased to 24 inches (610 mm) but otherwise identical.

| HR number | Name |
|---|---|
| 36 | Nairn |
| 37 | Struan |
| 38 | Kincraig |
| 39 | Aviemore |
| 40 | Keith |
| 41 | Kingussie |
| 42 | Lentran |
| 43 | Dava |
| 44 | Brodie |
| 45 | Dalcross |

All were rebuilt by Jones between 1874 and 1893, gaining 18-by-24-inch (457 mm × 610 mm) cylinders, and having their driving wheels increased to 5 feet 3 inches (1,600 millimetres) by means of applying thicker tyres. Withdrawals commenced in 1896, but nos. 27, 37 and 42 survived into LMS ownership.

==== Glenbarry class ====
Three batches of 2-2-2s were supplied in 1863/64. They all had 120-pound-per-square-inch (8.3 bar; 830 kPa) boilers and cylinders with a 22-inch (559 mm) stroke. Driving wheels were 6 feet 1.5 inches (1,867 mm).

Two were built by Hawthorns in 1863 with 17-inch (432 mm) cylinders:

| HR number | Name |
|---|---|
| 28 | Glenbarry |
| 29 | Highlander |

Six more were built by Neilson and Company in 1863 with 16.5-inch (419 mm) bore cylinders. They were all converted to 17-inch (432 mm) bore at an unspecified later date.

| HR number | Name |
|---|---|
| 30 | Prince |
| 31 | Princess |
| 32 | Sutherland |
| 33 | Atholl |
| 34 | Seafield |
| 35 | Kingsmills |

A further batch of ten was built by Neilson in 1864. They had 17-inch (432 mm) inch bore cylinders.

| HR number | Name |
|---|---|
| 46 | Clachnacuddin |
| 47 | Bruce |
| 48 | Cadboll |
| 49 | Belladrum |
| 50 | Aultnaskiah |
| 51 | Caithness |
| 52 | Dunphail |
| 53 | Stafford |
| 54 | Macduff |
| 55 | Cluny |

With increased traffic, especially over the Perth line, heavier locomotives were needed, but the company was short of money. Jones responded by following Stroudley's example of rebuilding 2-2-2s as 2-4-0s. No. 29 was the first to be rebuilt in 1871, and by 1893 all except no. 32 had been so converted. Cylinder dimensions were increased to 18 by 24 inches (457 mm × 610 mm). Seven locomotives received larger boilers between 1881 and 1896, and the others were withdrawn between 1897 and 1900. The reboilered examples lasted longer, and no. 35 was still in service (latterly renumbered 35A) at the Grouping.

=== William Stroudley ===
==== Lochgorm Tanks ====
During William Stroudley's tenure as locomotive superintendent from 1865–69 only one new locomotive was built. This was No. 56, an 0-6-0ST built at the Highland Railway's Lochgorm works in Inverness in 1869. This is generally considered the basis of the LB&SCR "Terrier" locomotives he produced later in his career. Two similar locomotives were built under Jones' in 1873 and 1874. They had 3-foot-7-inch (1,092 mm) wheels and 14-by-20-inch (356 mm × 508 mm) cylinders. The boiler of the first is believed to have come from no. 3.

They were classified as class R in Peter Drummond's 1901 classification scheme.

| HR number | Name | Built | LMS No. | Withdrawn | Notes |
|---|---|---|---|---|---|
| 56 | Balnain | 1869 | 16118 | 1926 | Renamed Dornoch in 1902. Renumbered 56A in 1920, and 56B in 1922 |
| 57 | Lochgorm | 1872 | 16119 | 1932 | Name removed in 1898. Renumbered 57A in 1920, and 57B in 1922 |
| 16 | St Martins | 1874 | 16383 | 1928 | Renamed Fort George in 1899. Renumbered 49 in 1901, and 49A in 1912 |

No. 56 was rebuilt by Jones in 1895, and the other two were similarly rebuilt by Drummond in 1897. Alterations included thicker tyres to increase the wheel diameter to 3 feet 6 inches (1,067 mm), and the provision of larger bunkers. No. 16 was later renumbered 49. All three passed to the LMS in 1923; who removed the names when applying LMS livery.

== Naming and numbering ==
As will be apparent, the original numbering scheme was a simple chronological sequence, although Stroudley tank no. 16 was built as a replacement for the original Findhorn branch engine and received its number. In later years, new locomotives took some of the early numbers, and surviving early engines were either renumbered or given an 'A' suffix.

Renaming locomotives was common in the early years, and only the first name is recorded here. Part of the reason for multiple engines having the same name was that names were applied to locomotives used on an appropriate part of the line. If an engine was reallocated then the name was moved to another. The name Bruce was commonly used for Highland Railway locomotives (five total were given it), and contrary to common belief it was not done after King Robert the Bruce but of the Hon. C. T. Bruce who was Chairman of the company from 1885 to 1891 (and had earlier been Chairman of the Inverness and Perth Junction Railway).

== Classic features ==
Features introduced during the 1860s and stayed until Peter Drummond's tenure were the louvered chimneys and counter-pressure brake.

The chimney was actually a pair of concentric ones. It is usually considered to have aided forward visibility for the driver (a form of smoke deflectors), but there is some evidence it was to reduce the chance of lineside fires (like the prominent 'stacks' of early United States designs).
