= List of BR 'Clan' Class locomotives =

Below are the names and numbers of the steam locomotives that comprised the BR standard class 6, or 'Clan' Class that ran on the Scottish Region of British Railways' railway network. They represented an attempt to regionalise some of the names of the standard pacifics, resulting in E.S. Cox's decision to name the class after the former Highland Railway's outgoing Clan Class, designed by Christopher Cumming.

== Locomotives as constructed ==
BR No.	Name	Builder	When built	Withdrawn	Notes
72000	Clan Buchanan	Crewe	December 1951	December 1962	
72001	Clan Cameron	Crewe	December 1951	December 1962	
72002	Clan Campbell	Crewe	June 1952	December 1962	
72003	Clan Fraser	Crewe	June 1952	December 1962	
72004	Clan MacDonald	Crewe	July 1952	December 1962	
72005	Clan MacGregor	Crewe	July 1952	May 1965	Never fitted with Automatic Warning System (AWS)
72006	Clan MacKenzie	Crewe	July 1952	May 1966	
72007	Clan MacKintosh	Crewe	August 1952	December 1965	
72008	Clan MacLeod	Crewe	September 1952	April 1966	
72009	Clan Stewart	Crewe	September 1952	August 1965	

== Unbuilt locomotives ==
A further 15 'Clans' was projected, but due to an acute shortage of steel, the order was frequently postponed until the advent of the British Railways Modernisation Plan, which led to the order being cancelled. Five of the unbuilt locomotives were expected to operate on the Southern Region and so a change in naming style was planned for the next five in series. It was intended to revert to Scottish Region parlance for the final ten. The projected names were:

Southern Region.

72010 Hengist, 72011 Horsa, 72012 Canute, 72013 Wildfire, 72014 Firebrand.

Scottish Region.

72015 Clan Colquhoun, 72016 Clan Graham, 72017 Clan MacDougall, 72018 Clan MacLean, 72019 Clan Douglas, 72020 Clan Gordon, 72021 Clan Hamilton, 72022 Clan Kennedy, 72023 Clan Lindsay, 72024 Clan Scott.

The names Hengist and Horsa had been used previously by BR for cross-channel Sealink ships.

=== New build ===
A start has been made on constructing a new locomotive of the missing batch of 15, number 72010 Hengist, being assembled at CTL Seal in Sheffield. This locomotive project constitutes the commencement of the 1000th locomotive build to a British Railways standard design.
