= BR Standard Class 6 72010 Hengist =

Steam locomotive

BR 72010 Hengist
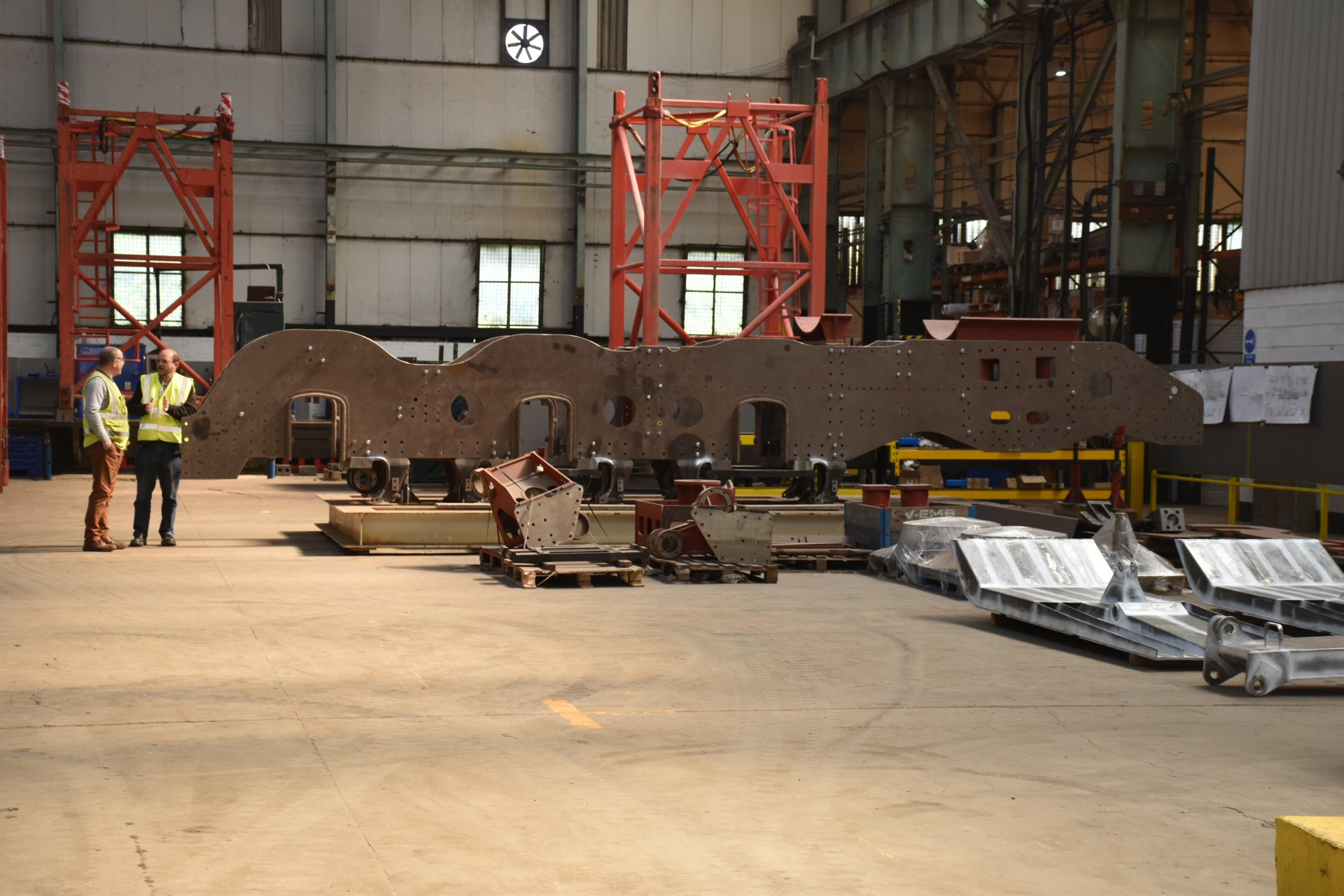
- Frames being assembled in Sheffield in May 2019
Type and origin
- Power type: Steam
- Builder: The Clan Project
Specifications
- Configuration
  - Whyte: 4-6-2
  - UIC: 2′C1′ h2
- Gauge: 4 ft 8 1/2 in (1,435 mm) standard gauge
- Leading dia.: 3 ft 4 in (1,016 mm)
- Driver dia.: 6 ft 2 in (1,880 mm)
- Trailing dia.: 3 ft 3 1/2 in (1,003 mm)
Career
- Class: Standard Class 6
- Number in class: 11
- Numbers: 72010
- Official name: Hengist
- Disposition: Under Construction

No.72010 Hengist is a steam locomotive which is under construction as a "new-build" project. The design is based on the mixed traffic BR Standard 6 Clan Class, none of which were preserved. The project is akin to the construction of the 60163 Tornado.

The project maintains a build diary, showing monthly progress of the build which has been ongoing since 2010.

== History ==
=== Background ===
The Clan class was a batch of 10 4-6-2 (pacific) locomotives built in the early 1950s. Their purpose was to be a lightweight version of the power class 7 Britannia locomotives that could operate over a wider variety of routes, albeit with slightly reduced power. The first batch was destined for Scotland, hence the name "Clan". Following experience with the first batch, a second batch of 15 was planned with design improvements. The first of these was to be allocated to the Southern Region with the number 72010 and name Hengist. However, due to a shortage of steel in the 1950s, and a change in motive power policy the order was postponed and later cancelled.

No members of the class survived into preservation. 72006 Clan McKenzie was withdrawn in May 1966 and all were scrapped by August 1966.

=== Project ===
The Clan Project was initiated with the objective to create a new member of the class. As a go-anywhere engine with a low maintenance design, especially when incorporating improvements destined for the batch, the design should be most suitable for use on heritage railways as well as hauling rail tours. The engine is being built to modern mainline standards.

The project was initially based at the Swanage Railway, but by 2017, the project was at the Great Central Railway where the completed cab and smokebox were displayed for a while, however logistics were to require a fourth move.

The project is now based at the premises of CTL Seal in Sheffield. All of the components for the first phase of frame assembly are on site and assembly has commenced. Components for the bogie frame are either in stock or are being manufactured, bogie frame assembly commenced in August 2023. Meanwhile, the pattern for the outside cylinders is under construction.

Between 1951 and 1960, 999 BR Standard types were built across 12 locomotive classes and 72010, when completed, will be the 1000th.

== Design ==
An improved design was worked out by British Railways and was to form the basis of the Crewe Works Order Lot 242 for the second batch of Clans. The main changes involve:

- The frame design from 71000 Duke of Gloucester, which involves 3 substantial steel castings, or combined frame stretchers and spring hangers. This change was to address frame cracking on the Britannias and Clans.
- The delta trailing truck from 71000 which has coil springs instead of the leaf springs of the original Clan design.
- New ashpan arrangement incorporating a number of changes including improved operating gear.
- Revised pipe and rod arrangement.
- Revised cab/tender connection, including a fall plate and gangway doors.
