= Highland Railway O Class =

Highland Railway O class
Type and origin
- Power type: Steam
- Designer: David Jones
- Builder: HR Lochgorm Works
- Build date: 1878–1879
- Total produced: 3
Specifications
- Configuration
  - Whyte: 2-4-0T (rebuilt as 4-4-0T)
  - UIC: 1′B t, rebuilt as 2′B t
- Gauge: 4 ft 8 1/2 in (1,435 mm)
- Leading dia.: New: 3 ft 9 1/2 in (1.156 m); Rebuilt: 2 ft 7 1/2 in (0.800 m)
- Driver dia.: 4 ft 9 in (1.448 m)
- Loco weight: New: 36 long tons 0 cwt (80,600 lb or 36.6 t); Rebuilt: 44 long tons 0 cwt (98,600 lb or 44.7 t)
- Boiler pressure: 140 lbf/in^{2} (0.97 MPa)
- Heating surface: 913 sq ft (84.8 m^{2})
- Cylinders: Two, outside
- Cylinder size: 16 in × 22 in (406 mm × 559 mm)
- Valve gear: Allan
Performance figures
- Tractive effort: 12,158 lbf (54.08 kN)
Career
- Operators: Highland Railway → London, Midland & Scottish
- Class: HR: O
- Power class: LMS: unclassified
- Withdrawn: 1928–1932
- Disposition: All scrapped

The Highland Railway O Class locomotives were built as 2-4-0T tank engines, but were soon rebuilt as 4-4-0Ts. They were designed by David Jones for Scottish Railway companies and three were built at the company's Lochgorm Works in 1878 and 1879.

== Dimensions ==
They had 4-foot-9-inch (1,448 mm) coupled wheels, 16-by-22-inch (406 by 559 mm) outside cylinders and weight (in original condition) of 36 tons.

== Numbering ==
Table of locomotives
HR No.	Name	Date built	LMS No.	Withdrawn	Notes
58	Burghead	December 1878	15011	1928	Name removed in 1900. Renumbered 58A in 1912 and 58B in 1920
59	Highlander	June 1879	15010	1933	Name removed in 1900. Renumbered 59A in 1912 and 59B in 1920
17	Breadalbane	December 1879	15012	1929	Renamed Aberfeldy in 1886; name removed in 1900. Renumbered 50 in 1901, 50A in 1912, 50B in 1920

== Rebuilding ==
They were rebuilt as 4-4-0Ts in 1881–82 due to trouble with the single leading axle.

== Transfer to LMS ==
All three were still in service in 1923, although relegated to shunting duties, and they were transferred to the London, Midland and Scottish Railway (LMS) at the Grouping.

== Withdrawal ==
The three locomotives were withdrawn and scrapped between 1928 and 1933.
