= Fredrick George Smith =

British mechanical engineer (1872–1956)

- Born: 1872; Newcastle upon Tyne
- Died: 1956 (aged 83–84)
- Occupation: Mechanical engineer

Fredrick George Smith (1872 – 1956) was a British mechanical engineer. He was born in Newcastle upon Tyne in 1872 and died in 1956. He was appointed manager of the Highland Railway's Lochgorm Works in 1903, and promoted to Assistant to the Chief Mechanical Engineer, Peter Drummond in 1903.

After Drummond's departure for the Glasgow and South Western Railway in 1911, Smith was appointed to replace him, albeit under the old title of Locomotive, Carriage and Wagon Superintendent. His only design for the Highland Railway was the River Class, which was rejected by the Chief Engineer, causing his resignation. He went on to take a post in the Ministry of Munitions and in 1918 entered the steel industry.

Business positions
Preceded by Peter Drummond	Locomotive, Carriage and Wagon Superintendent of the Highland Railway; 1912–1915	Succeeded by Christopher Cumming
