= Highland Railway Strath Class =

Highland Railway Strath or D class
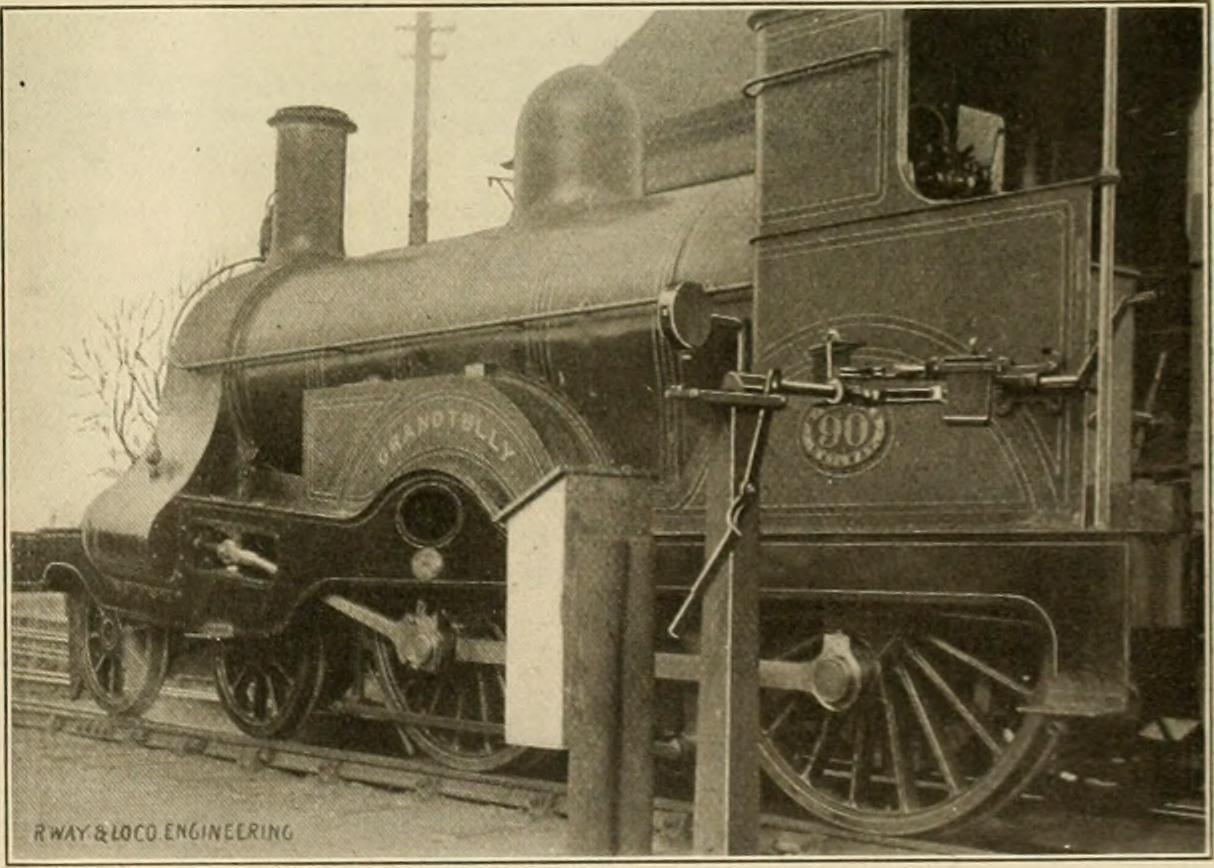
Type and origin
- Power type: Steam
- Designer: David Jones
- Builder: Neilson & Co.
- Serial number: 4428–4438
- Build date: 1892
- Total produced: 12
Specifications
- Configuration
  - Whyte: 4-4-0
  - UIC: 2′B n2
- Gauge: 4 ft 8 1/2 in (1,435 mm) standard gauge
- Leading dia.: 3 ft 9 1/2 in (1.156 m)
- Driver dia.: 6 ft 3 in (1.905 m)
- Loco weight: 45 long tons 0 cwt (100,800 lb or 45.7 t)
- Boiler: 4 ft 6 in (1.37 m) diameter
- Boiler pressure: 160 lbf/in^{2} (1.10 MPa)
- Heating surface: 1,242 sq ft (115.4 m^{2})
- Cylinders: Two, outside
- Cylinder size: 18 in × 24 in (457 mm × 610 mm)
- Valve gear: Stephenson
Performance figures
- Tractive effort: 16,786 lbf (74.67 kN)
Career
- Operators: Highland Railway → London, Midland & Scottish
- Class: HR: Strath; D (from 1901)
- Power class: LMS: 1P
- Number in class: 1 January 1923: 6
- Numbers: HR: 89–100; LMS 14271–14276
- Retired: 1923–1930
- Disposition: All scrapped

The Highland Railway Strath Class were 4-4-0 steam locomotives introduced in 1892, to the design of David Jones.

== Construction ==
Twelve were built by Neilson and Company and delivered between May and July 1892.

== Design ==
They were identical to the class E Clyde Bogies apart from having boilers of a larger diameter which allowed an increased heating surface.

== Numbering ==
Table of locomotives
HR No.	Name	LMS No.	Withdrawn	Notes
89	Sir George	14271	1930	
90	Tweeddale	—	1923	Renamed Grandtully in 1897. Renumbered 90A in 1919
91	Strathspey	—	1923	Renumbered 91A in 1919
92	Strathdearn	14272	1930	Renamed Glendean at unknown date. Renumbered 92A in 1921
93	Strathnairn	—	1923	Renumbered 93A at unknown date.
94	Strathtay	14273	1924	LMS number never applied
95	Strathcarron	14274	1930	
96	Glentilt	—	1923	Renumbered 96A in 1922
97	Glenmore	—	1923	Renumbered 97A in 1922
98	Glentruim	14275	1930	
99	Glentromie	—	1923	Renumbered 99A in 1922
100	Glenbruar	14276	1930	

== Transfer to LMS ==
Half of the class survived to be taken over by the London, Midland and Scottish Railway (LMS) at the 1923 Grouping but the last was withdrawn in 1930.
