= Christopher Cumming =

British mechanical engineer (1860–1933)

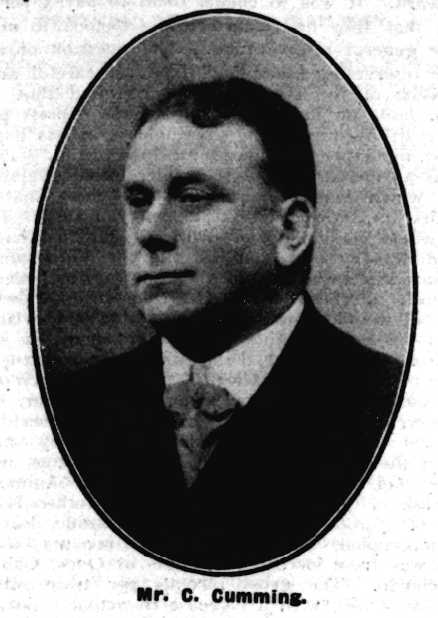
- Picture from Railway News of 30 October 1915
- Born: 1860; Edinburgh
- Died: 1924 (aged 63–64)
- Occupation: Mechanical engineer

Christopher Cumming (1860–1924) was a British mechanical engineer who produced designs for three classes of locomotives for the Highland Railway.

== Life ==
He was born in Edinburgh on 15 April 1860.

He commenced his railway career as a locomotive engineer with the North British Railway (NBR) at Ladybank, and finished his apprenticeship in the drawing office at Cowlairs, being engaged for some time afterwards at the Cowlairs works and other locomotive depots. He was then appointed assistant locomotive foreman at Dundee, and locomotive foreman at Hawick, Thornton, Parkhead and Burntisland. Then he was district locomotive superintendent for Fife and the northern section of the North British Railway, which he held until appointed Locomotive, Carriage and Wagon Superintendent for the Highland Railway in 1915.

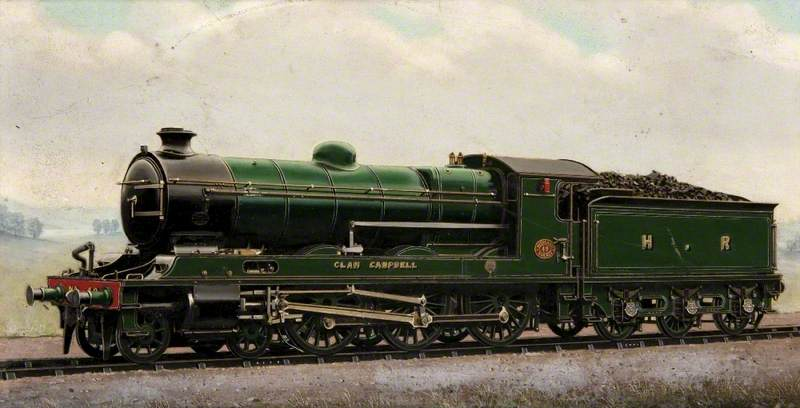
Locomotive No. 49 Clan Campbell of 1919

Whilst at the Highland Railway he designed one class of 4-4-0 and two types of 4-6-0, totalling 18 locomotives, from R. & W. Hawthorn, Leslie and Company of Newcastle on Tyne which all passed to the LMS. Two Highland Railway Cumming 4-4-0 Class delivered in 1916, eight Highland Railway Clan Goods Class delivered in 1918–19 and eight Highland Railway Clan Class delivered in 1919 and 1921.

Between the two 4-4-0s and the first of the 4-6-0s, Cumming also took delivery of six locomotives from the North British Locomotive Company to the designs of two of his predecessors: three each of David Jones' Loch Class 4-4-0 and Peter Drummond's Castle Class 4-6-0 were built in 1917. They had been authorised and ordered in October 1915, the same month that Cumming was appointed, and before construction commenced, Cumming made some modifications to the designs.

In early 1922, his health began to decline sharply, as a consequence of which he resigned from the Highland Railway on 1 March 1922. He died in 1924.

None of his locomotives survived into preservation.

In 1904, while working for the NBR at Dundee, he was granted a patent, number 4179, for "Improvements in and relating to Railway Carriage and Wagon Couplings."

Business positions
| Preceded by Fredrick George Smith | Locomotive, Carriage and Wagon Superintendent of the Highland Railway; 1915-1922 | Succeeded by David Chalmers Urie |
