= Highland Railway River class =

Former class of British 4-6-0 locomotives

HR 'River' class CR 938 class
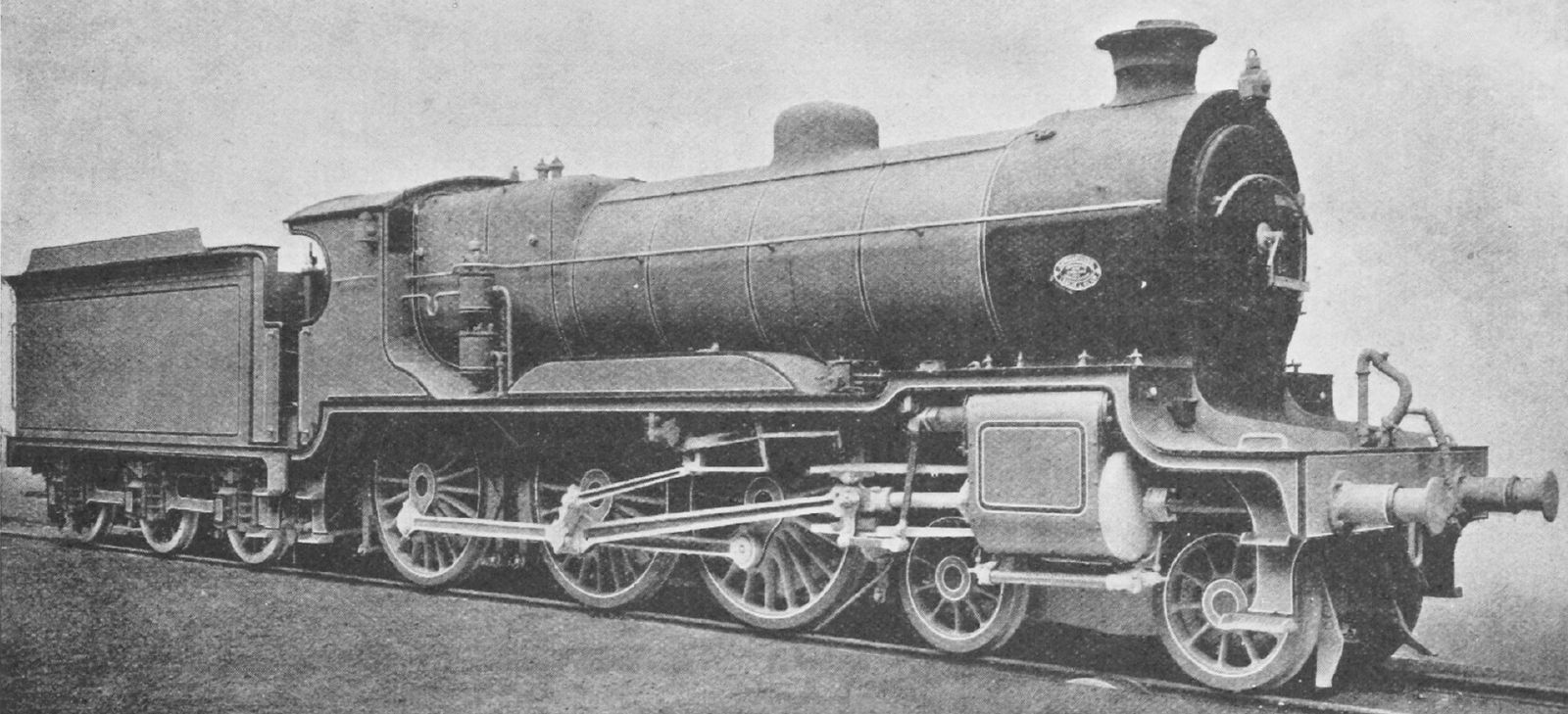
- Builders photo of a River Class, 1917
Type and origin
- Power type: Steam
- Designer: F. G. Smith
- Builder: Hawthorn Leslie and Company
- Serial number: 3095–3100
- Build date: 1915
- Total produced: 6
Specifications
- Configuration
  - Whyte: 4-6-0
- Gauge: 4 ft 8 1/2 in (1,435 mm) standard gauge
- Leading dia.: 3 ft 3 in (0.991 m)
- Driver dia.: 6 ft 0 in (1.829 m)
- Loco weight: 72 long tons 6 cwt (162,000 lb or 73.5 t)
- Boiler: 5 ft 1 13/16 in (1.57 m) diameter
- Boiler pressure: 160 psi (1.10 MPa)
- Heating surface
  - Flues: 25.3 sq ft (2.35 m^{2})
  - Total surface: 1,599 sq ft (148.6 m^{2})
- Superheater
  - Type: Robinson, 24 element
  - Heating area: 350 sq ft (33 m^{2})
- Cylinders: Two, outside
- Cylinder size: 21 in × 28 in (533 mm × 711 mm)
- Valve gear: Walschaerts
- Valve type: 10-inch (254 mm) piston valves
Performance figures
- Tractive effort: 23,324 lbf (103.8 kN)
Career
- Operators: HR → CR → LMS
- Class: HR: River; CR: 938
- Power class: LMS: 4P
- Withdrawn: 1936, 1939, 1945–46
- Disposition: All scrapped

The Highland Railway River class was a class of 4-6-0 steam locomotives designed by F. G. Smith, who had joined the Highland Railway in 1904 from the North Eastern Railway. His initial post was manager of the Locomotive, Carriage and Wagon works at Inverness (usually referred to as Lochgorm works). When Peter Drummond left for the Glasgow and South Western Railway at the end of 1911, Smith was appointed Chief Mechanical Engineer in his place.

== Delivery to Highland Railway ==
The 'Rivers' were Smith's only design for the Highland Railway, and they were the largest and most powerful locomotives built for that company. This involved a deadweight driving axle loading of 17.75 long tons (18.03 t; 19.88 short tons), which exceeded the maximum allowed by the company's Civil Engineer. However Smith had taken this into account, and had designed the 'Rivers' to cause much lower 'hammer blow' on the track than the existing Highland locomotives. When this was taken into account, the 'Rivers' put the same total weight on the track as the older 'Castle' Class 4-6-0s.

The first two engines were delivered to Perth at the end of August 1915, causing disputes between Smith and the company's Chief Civil Engineer Alexander Newlands. Smith and Newlands had a difficult working relationship and avoided speaking to one another. Smith had likely not discussed the class's axle loading with Newlands, and Newlands did not raise the matter until they arrived. On delivery they were immediately placed in storage while the engineers checked the drawings. After this Newlands banned them from the line for being both out of gauge and too heavy for a number of bridges. Smith argued that hammer blow needed to be taken into account, but the company's board sided with Newlands and Smith was forced to resign.

== Sale to Caledonian Railway ==
The Highland managed to sell all six locomotives to the Caledonian Railway, allegedly for a price of £500 per engine. They were out of gauge to the CR as well, but modifications were minor and quickly made.

In Caledonian service they proved reliable and were well liked by their crews, despite having external cylinders when "native" classes had inside cylinders. They mostly worked on fast goods between Aberdeen and Carlisle with many footplatemen and shed mechanical staff finding them better than the CR's own 4-6-0 designs.

== LMS service ==
By the 1920s the effects of hammer blow were more widely understood, and the class was found to work safely over the Highland Main Line. In fact, taking hammer blow into account, the total weight the 'Rivers' put onto the track was about 1 long ton (1.0 t; 1.1 short tons) less than the 'Clan' 4-6-0s meant to replace them. Some of the weaker bridges on the Highland had been strengthened by that time regardless. Thus the 'Rivers' ended service on the line they had been built for, the last example being withdrawn and scrapped in 1946.

The LMS gave them the numbers 14756–61, and the power classification 4; this was revised to 4P in 1928. Between 1923 and 1926, the locomotives received the LMS red livery, but were later repainted black. Withdrawal commenced in 1936, but was not completed until 1946.

== Numbers and names ==
Planned numbers and names in Highland service were

Table of locomotives
Works	Built	HR no.	HR name	CR no.	LMS no.	Withdrawn
Hawthorn Leslie 3095	September 1915	70	River Ness	938	14756	October 1939
Hawthorn Leslie 3096	September 1915	71	River Spey	939	14757	December 1936
Hawthorn Leslie 3097	November 1915	(72)	(River Tay)	940	14758	September 1945
Hawthorn Leslie 3098	November 1915	(73)	(River Findhorn)	941	14759	February 1939
Hawthorn Leslie 3099	December 1915	(74)	(River Garry)	942	14760	December 1946
Hawthorn Leslie 3100	December 1915	(75)	(River Tummel)	943	14761	October 1939
