= Kildrummie Platform railway station =

Short-lived railway station in Cawdor, Highland

Kildrummie Platform

General information
- Location: Cawdor, Highland; Scotland
- Coordinates: 57.5643°N 3.9245°W
- Grid reference: NH849543
- Platforms: 1

Other information
- Status: Disused

History
- Original company: Inverness and Nairn Railway
- Pre-grouping: Inverness and Nairn Railway

Key dates
- 1 December 1855: Opened as Cawdor
- 1 January 1857: Name changed to Kildrummie
- 1 January 1858: Closed
Location

Kildrummie railway station served the village of Cawdor, Highland, Scotland, from 1855 to 1858 on the Inverness and Nairn Railway.

== History ==
The station was opened as Cawdor on 1 December 1855 by the Inverness and Nairn Railway. Its name was changed to Kildrummie on 1 January 1857. It was a short-lived station, only being open for just over two years, closing on 1 January 1858, although it was still in the timetable for the rest of January of the same year. It continued as a private platform for the Earl of Cawdor and its name was changed to Kildrummie Platform. This continued until 1880.

Preceding station	Historical railways	Following station
Gollanfield Junction; Line open, station closed	Inverness and Nairn Railway	Nairn; Line and station open
