= Highland Railway Cumming 4-4-0 Class =

Highland Railway Cumming 4-4-0
Type and origin
- Power type: Steam
- Designer: Christopher Cumming
- Builder: Hawthorn Leslie
- Serial number: 3172–3173
- Build date: 1916
- Total produced: 2
Specifications
- Configuration
  - Whyte: 4-4-0
  - UIC: 2′B
- Gauge: 4 ft 8 1/2 in (1,435 mm)
- Leading dia.: 3 ft 3 in (0.991 m)
- Driver dia.: 6 ft 3 in (1.905 m)
- Loco weight: 54 long tons 19 1/2 cwt (125,400 lb or 56.9 t)
- Fuel type: Coal
- Boiler: 4 ft 8 9/16 in (1.44 m) diameter
- Boiler pressure: 175 psi (1.21 MPa)
- Heating surface: 1,140 sq ft (106 m^{2})
- Superheater
  - Type: Robinson
  - Heating area: 180 sq ft (17 m^{2})
- Cylinders: Two, outside
- Cylinder size: 20 in × 26 in (508 mm × 660 mm)
- Valve gear: Walschaerts
- Valve type: Inside admission piston valves
- Train brakes: Vacuum
Performance figures
- Tractive effort: 20,627 lbf (91.8 kN)
Career
- Operators: HR, LMS
- Power class: LMS: 3P
- Numbers: HR: 73–74, LMS: 14522–14523
- Withdrawn: 1935–1936
- Disposition: Both scrapped

The Highland Railway Cumming 4-4-0 class was a pair of 4-4-0 steam locomotives designed by Christopher Cumming, the Locomotive Superintendent of the Highland Railway

== Dimensions ==
They had 20-by-26-inch (510 mm × 660 mm) outside cylinders with Walschaerts valve gear, 6 ft 3 in (1.905 m) driving wheels and a boiler pressed to 175 lbf/in^{2} (1.21 MPa). Weight was a half-hundredweight short of 56 long tons (125,400 lb or 56.9 t).

== Numbering ==
Table of engines
HR No.	Name	LMS No.	Withdrawn	Notes
73	Snaigow	14522	April 1936	
74	Durn	14523	April 1935	

== Transfer to LMS ==
Both survived into London, Midland and Scottish Railway ownership in 1923, but neither lasted until nationalisation, as both were withdrawn and scrapped as non-standard engines in the mid-1930s. The LMS had classed them as 3P.
