= BR Standard Class 6 =

Class of two-cylinder 4-6-2 locomotives

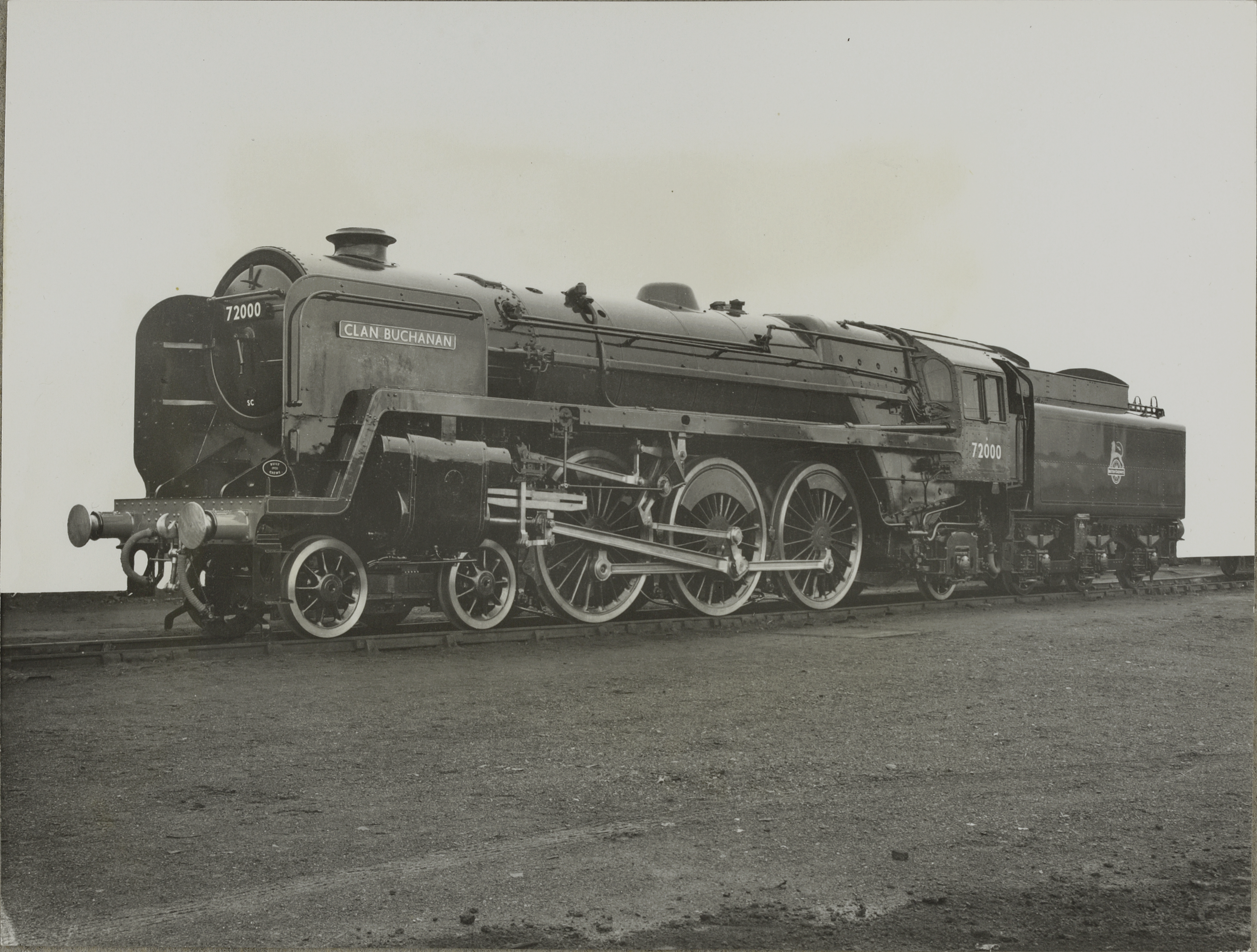
- No. 72000 Clan Buchanan in 1951
Type and origin
- Power type: Steam
- Designer: Robert Riddles at BR Derby
- Builder: BR Crewe Works
- Build date: December 1951 – March 1952
- Total produced: 10
Specifications
- Configuration
  - Whyte: 4-6-2
  - UIC: 2′C1′ h2
- Gauge: 4 ft 8 1/2 in (1,435 mm) standard gauge
- Leading dia.: 3 ft 4 in (1,016 mm)
- Driver dia.: 6 ft 2 in (1,880 mm)
- Trailing dia.: 3 ft 3 1/2 in (1,003 mm)
- Length: 68 ft 9 in (20.96 m)
- Width: 8 ft 8 3/4 in (2.66 m)
- Height: 13 ft 0 1/2 in (3.98 m)
- Axle load: 19 long tons (19 t; 21 short tons)
- Adhesive weight: 56.9 long tons (57.8 t; 63.7 short tons)
- Loco weight: 88.5 long tons (89.9 t; 99.1 short tons)
- Tender weight: 49.15 long tons (49.94 t; 55.05 short tons)
- Tender type: BR1
- Fuel type: Coal
- Fuel capacity: 7 long tons (7.1 t; 7.8 short tons)
- Water cap.: 4,250 imp gal (19,300 L; 5,100 US gal)
- Firebox
  - Grate area: 36 sq ft (3.3 m^{2})
- Boiler: BR1
- Boiler pressure: 225 psi (1,550 kPa)
- Heating surface
  - Firebox: 195 sq ft (18.1 m^{2})
  - Tubes and flues: 1,878 sq ft (174.5 m^{2})
- Superheater
  - Heating area: 592 sq ft (55.0 m^{2})
- Cylinders: Two, outside
- Cylinder size: 19.5 in × 28 in (495 mm × 711 mm)
Performance figures
- Tractive effort: 27,520 lbf (122.4 kN)
- Factor of adh.: 4.63
Career
- Operators: British Railways
- Power class: 6P5F
- Numbers: 72000–72009
- Axle load class: Route Availability 8
- Locale: Scottish Region, London Midland Region
- Withdrawn: December 1962 – June 1966
- Disposition: All original locomotives scrapped, 72010 Hengist under construction.

The BR Standard Class 6, otherwise known as the Clan Class, was a class of 4-6-2 "Pacific" tender steam locomotive designed by Robert Riddles for use by British Railways. Ten locomotives were constructed between 1951 and 1952, with a further 15 planned for construction. However, due to acute steel shortages in Britain, the order was continually postponed until it was finally cancelled on the publication of the 1955 Modernisation Plan for the re-equipment of British Railways. All of the original locomotives were scrapped, but a new one is being built.

The Clan Class was based upon the BR Standard Class 7 Britannia Class design, incorporating a smaller boiler and various weight-saving measures to increase the route availability of a Pacific-type locomotive for its intended area of operations, the west of Scotland. The Clan Class received a mixed reception from crews, with those regularly operating the locomotives giving favourable reports as regards performance. However, trials in other areas of the British Railways network returned negative feedback, a common complaint being that difficulty in steaming the locomotive made it hard to adhere to timetables. Reports exist that suggest a degree of the disappointment with these locomotives was attributable to their being allocated to Class 7 work where they were only a Class 6 in reality; a problem put down to their very similar appearance to the BR Standard Class 7.

Some of the Clan Class locomotives took their names from the Highland Railway Clan Class which was being withdrawn from service at the time, indicating further their intended area of operations. The class was ultimately deemed a failure by British Railways, and the last was withdrawn in 1966. None survived into preservation, although a project to build the next locomotive in line, number 72010 Hengist, is progressing. Assembly of the frames has commenced at CTL Seal, Sheffield.

== Background ==
Under the initial scheme for the creation of a series of British Railways standard locomotives, larger passenger and mixed traffic types were intended to be of the 4-6-2 Pacific wheel arrangement, the main advantage of which was that it could be fitted with a wide firebox capable of burning a range of coal types (and qualities). The Pacifics were originally intended to be produced in four power groups: 8, 7, 6, and 5, according to the system of power ratings inherited from the LMS constituent company. Power groups 7, 6 & 5 were to be for mixed traffic (MT) service. The whole standardisation programme was launched with the building of the 7MT Britannia design in 1951; in the event, the 5MT proposal was dropped in favour of an updated version of the highly successful Stanier mixed traffic 4-6-0.

It was further appreciated that a Pacific of 6MT power could be built with a high enough route availability to fulfil all remaining requirements; this had been amply demonstrated by Oliver Bulleid, Chief Mechanical Engineer of the Southern Railway, who had developed a lighter version of his large 3-cylinder Merchant Navy Class in 1945. H.A.V. Bulleid, Oliver Bulleid's son, advocated that the resultant Light Pacifics had "almost 90%" route availability on the Southern railway network.

The advantages of such a locomotive for use on some of the heavily restricted main lines in Scotland, such as the Dumfries to Stranraer line, had been further demonstrated by the remarkable performance of Light Pacific number 34004 Yeovil on the ex Highland Railway line to Inverness during the British Railways 1948 Locomotive Exchange Trials. During these trials the locomotive showed that a Light Pacific had the potential to revolutionise the timetable over this difficult trunk route. As the general policy of the Railway Executive was to eliminate as far as possible the perceived complication of multi-cylinder locomotives, an equivalent 2-cylinder Pacific was produced by mounting a smaller and lighter boiler on the standard 7MT chassis.

== Design details ==
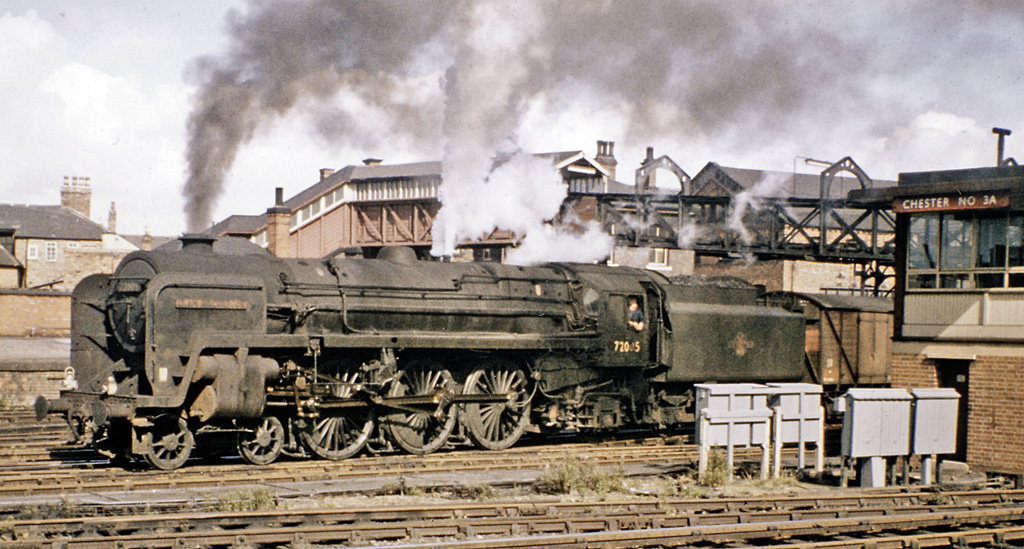
No. 72005 'Clan MacGregor' at Chester General, 29 August 1964

The arrangement consisted of a modified Standard Class 7 boiler, with smaller steel cylinders and other modifications to save weight and hence increase route availability. The wider firebox, designed for use with cheaper imported coal, was also utilised to spread its weight evenly over the axles, whilst the standard smokebox completed the boiler, which at 225 lbf/in^{2} was rated at a lower working pressure than that of the Britannias. A single chimney was incorporated into the design, although this was to create problems later on, due to its small diameter, which reduced the choke area that allowed the fierce exhaust blast to escape, reducing the overall efficiency of the locomotive. Similarities with the Britannias rested with the frames, tenders and running gear, allowing easy standardisation of parts common with other classes. The design was fitted with a standard set of two Walschaerts valve gear systems, and all members of the class were equipped with 4,200 gallon BR 1 tenders.

Following experience of occasional cracks appearing in the frame plates near the spring brackets, had the second batch of Class 6 Standard Pacifics been built, the chassis would have been rearranged to be similar to that used on the solitary Class 8 Pacific. This would have resulted in the locomotive riding on three cast steel Combined Frame Stretcher & Spring Brackets carrying the 10 front-most spring brackets and lengthened spring brackets behind the rear driven axle. These Combined Frame Stretcher & Spring Brackets are often referred to as "sub-frames". (Perhaps remarkably, the rearmost spring brackets were not to be integrated into a single cast combined sub-frame/pony truck pivot stretcher. The pony truck pivot stretcher being a separate fabrication).

Unlike the smaller BR Standards the exhaust steam manifold within the smokebox saddle (along with the BR Standard Class 7 engines) was a steel casting that was welded into the saddle. Other original drawings confirm the exhaust steam manifold was a steel fabrication in the smaller BR standards.

== Construction history ==
Designed at the drawing offices of Derby Works, the new class was constructed at British Railways' Crewe Works between 1951 and 1952. The initial order was for 25 locomotives, but such was the immediacy of demand regarding a smaller version of the Britannias that a batch of 10 was rushed through construction before teething problems had been ironed out at the British Railways testing station at Rugby. No more were constructed due to the steel shortages of the 1950s, and onset of the British Railways Modernisation Plan from 1954.

=== Initial modifications ===
After initial running-in, E.S. Cox was quoted as discerning a distinct "woolliness" in their steaming, and although they missed their appointment at the Rugby Locomotive Testing Station due to late completion, some modifications were carried out, most notably to the diameter of the blastpipe, resulting in better steaming and increased power. Initially, the return cranks on the main driving wheels were of LNER block-type as seen on Arthur Peppercorn's A1s and A2s, but this was changed to the simpler LMS four-stud fitting. With time, enough information was gathered from operational feedback from crews to allow modifications to be applied to the further 15 locomotives on order in the second batch, had they been built.

=== Naming the locomotives ===
The choice of locomotive names came from engineer and future railway historian Ernest Stewart Cox's desire to replicate the extinct Ex-Highland Railway 4-6-0 Clan Class,(the last example being withdrawn in January 1950), thereby representing Scotland in the new organisation. The first of the class, No. 72000 Clan Buchanan, was treated to a special ceremony at Glasgow Central station on 15 January 1952 at which the Lord Provost unveiled its nameplates. Five of these names had previously been used on Highland Railway locomotives. The first five of the planned second batch of 15 locomotives were intended for use on BR's Southern Region; these were allocated names Hengist, Horsa, Canute, Wildfire and Firebrand, which had all been previously used on locomotives in southern England. The following ten were to be allocated to Scotland and were allocated further "Clan" names, all of which were new.

== Operational details ==
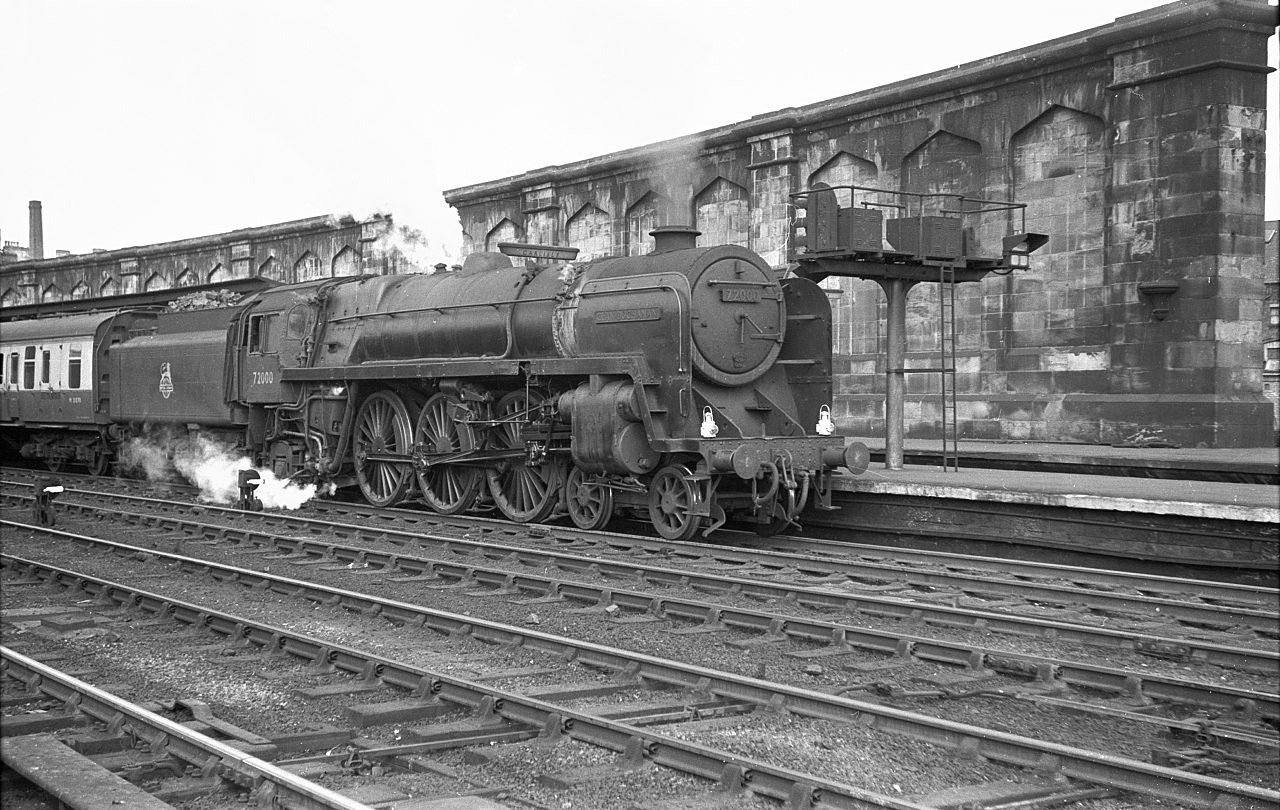
72000 'Clan Buchanan' at Carlisle Citadel station on 1 August 1959.

The Clan Class had a mixed reception when first introduced to British Railways locomotive crews because there were only 10 locomotives in a class that was mostly confined to the North West of the railway network. This was due to the fact the low number of class members prevented effective training of locomotive crews throughout the nationalised network, and a degree of partisanship amongst crews towards newer locomotives further ensured this. The entire class was also based predominantly at two depots throughout their working lives, these being Glasgow Polmadie and Carlisle Kingmoor, compounding their restricted circulation. However, factors such as these meant that they spent most of their short careers out of the limelight that the Britannias had, resulting in a relatively camera shy class of locomotive. Crews that used them on regular duties displayed their liking for the locomotives, and as such, could produce good work. However, the predominant number of crews who were unfamiliar with the Clans found them difficult to handle, leading to an undeservedly bad reputation.

The poor steaming characteristics of the class had been the result of rushed production, which was another factor that led to the bad reputation of the Clan Class. Furthermore, they suffered from complaints regarding a lack of pulling power, although this can be attributed to indifferent handling and firing techniques, which certainly did not help the situation. However, had the Modernisation Plan been delayed, and the correct amount of investment made for undertaking the relevant modifications, such as streamlining of the steam passages and increased diameter blastpipe in a double-chimney layout, the Clans would have been free-steaming workhorses worthy of complementing the Britannias. Without modification, they were still capable machines when handled properly, as various feats testifying this included regular ascents of Shap and Beattock with 14 carriages without the assistance of a banking locomotive. Other arduous duties that the class frequently undertook were the regular turns on the Settle to Carlisle route, which has some of the steepest gradients and harshest working conditions of any British mainline. The Midland region was always short of top-link motive power and the Clan Class proved to be a very welcome addition to the fleet.

The engines also performed on Glasgow–Crewe, Manchester and Liverpool services, Edinburgh–Leeds services, Carlisle–Bradford services, and finally the Stranraer Boat Train workings. As more crews got used to them, the class could be found far from home territory at destinations as diverse as Aberdeen, Inverness, Port Talbot, Newcastle upon Tyne, Bristol, and even London. Clan number 72001 to this day remains the only Pacific locomotive to have worked over the West Highland Line, the result of a successful trial held in early 1956 to ascertain whether a Pacific type could traverse this steeply graded line. Having passed that test, a tribute to the versatility of the class, Clan Cameron was allowed to work special trains for the Clan Cameron gathering that took place in June of that year.

In August 1958, number 72009 was tested on the Eastern Region, being based at Stratford MPD, though a preference for the Britannias meant that this sojourn was short-lived, lasting only a month. The locomotive was utilised on services from London Liverpool Street to Norwich, Clacton, and Harwich. At first they were mistakenly allocated Class 7 duties, in which the Clans, although capable, were not able to keep to their allotted timings. This was part of the trials for the West Highland Line services mentioned earlier, but the locomotive was rejected for such duties on the grounds that they were "no better than a good B1". The result of these trials was that as both Standard Class 7 and 8 locomotives were moved north in 1961 after dieselisation started in earnest, the Clans were downgraded to secondary work. Maintenance was initially undertaken at Crewe Works, but responsibility was transferred to Cowlairs Works in the spring of 1958. More varied work was allocated to them as their reliability improved, including working portions of the Thames-Clyde Express and the Queen of Scots Pullman. They also deputised for the many failed diesel locomotives that plagued the network at the time, and were extensively used on freight workings.

Most Scottish and Midland region crews that used them regularly took to the class, and found that if used properly, running times were kept with ease. These crews rated them the most sure-footed of any Pacifics available on the Midland Region, though other crews who tested them claimed that the Clans were prone to slipping, though this was the case with most Pacific designs. Despite the various successes of the Clans, the class was generally regarded as a failure, even with overall performance being just short of Riddles' aims. However, the premise of all British Railways Standard designs was for a hard working, easily maintained, economical, highly available, and all-purpose locomotive. In these respects, the Clans were highly successful.

=== Proposed second batch and withdrawal ===
Prior to the publishing of the Modernisation Plan advocating the change-over to diesel traction, there was a proposal to construct a second batch of the Clan Class, which was accepted as Crewe Works Order Lot 242. This authorised the construction of a further batch of fifteen Clans that included modifications to the original design. Originally scheduled for 1952 with frames constructed for 72010 Hengist, acute steel shortages meant that the order was continually rescheduled until the publication of the British Railways Modernisation Plan finally halted the project. The initial name allocations for the new batch would seem to suggest several operating the Kent coast trains, hauling the Golden Arrow and other expresses, so that some of this batch would have been allocated to the Southern Region.

The first locomotives to be withdrawn from service were the Polmadie locos 72000-72004 en masse in December 1962, where after being moved first to Glasgow Parkhead and stored, they were eventually moved to Darlington for scrapping in 1964. Of the Kingmoor allocation, the first, number 72005, was withdrawn in April 1965, whilst the final loco was 72008 on 21 May 1966 from Carlisle Kingmoor shed. When No 72008 Clan MacLeod was finally scrapped in August 1966, it rendered the class extinct. Though this locomotive served British Railways for only fourteen years and three months, it was the longest serving Clan.

| Year | Quantity in service at start of year | Quantity withdrawn | Locomotive numbers | Notes |
|---|---|---|---|---|
| 1962 | 10 | 5 | 72000–04 | |
| 1965 | 5 | 3 | 72005/07/09 | |
| 1966 | 2 | 2 | 72006/08 | |

== Livery and numbering ==
The livery of the Clans was a continuation of the standard British Railways green applied to express passenger locomotives after nationalisation, lined in orange and black. The class was given the power classification 6P. Following on from the Britannias, the Clans were numbered under the British Railways standard numbering system in the 72xxx series. The locomotives were numbered between 72000 and 72009, and featured brass nameplates with a black background, located on the smoke deflectors, though towards the end of their working lives, some nameplates were painted with a red background.

== Preservation ==
None of the original engines survived into preservation, however progress is being made by a Registered Charity (No. 1062320), the Standard Steam Locomotive Company, on constructing the engine that would have been the first of the uncompleted batch of 15, number 72010 Hengist. As 999 BR standard steam locomotives were built in the years up to 1960 the builders consider this is the 1000th locomotive build to be commenced to a British Railways standard design. The Standard Steam Locomotive Company believes that significant costs will be avoided as many of the required cast parts can be made from patterns held by fellow members of the British Railways Standard Locomotive Owners Group (BRSLOG).

== See also ==
- List of BR 'Clan' Class locomotives
