= Highland Railway L Class =

Highland Railway L class
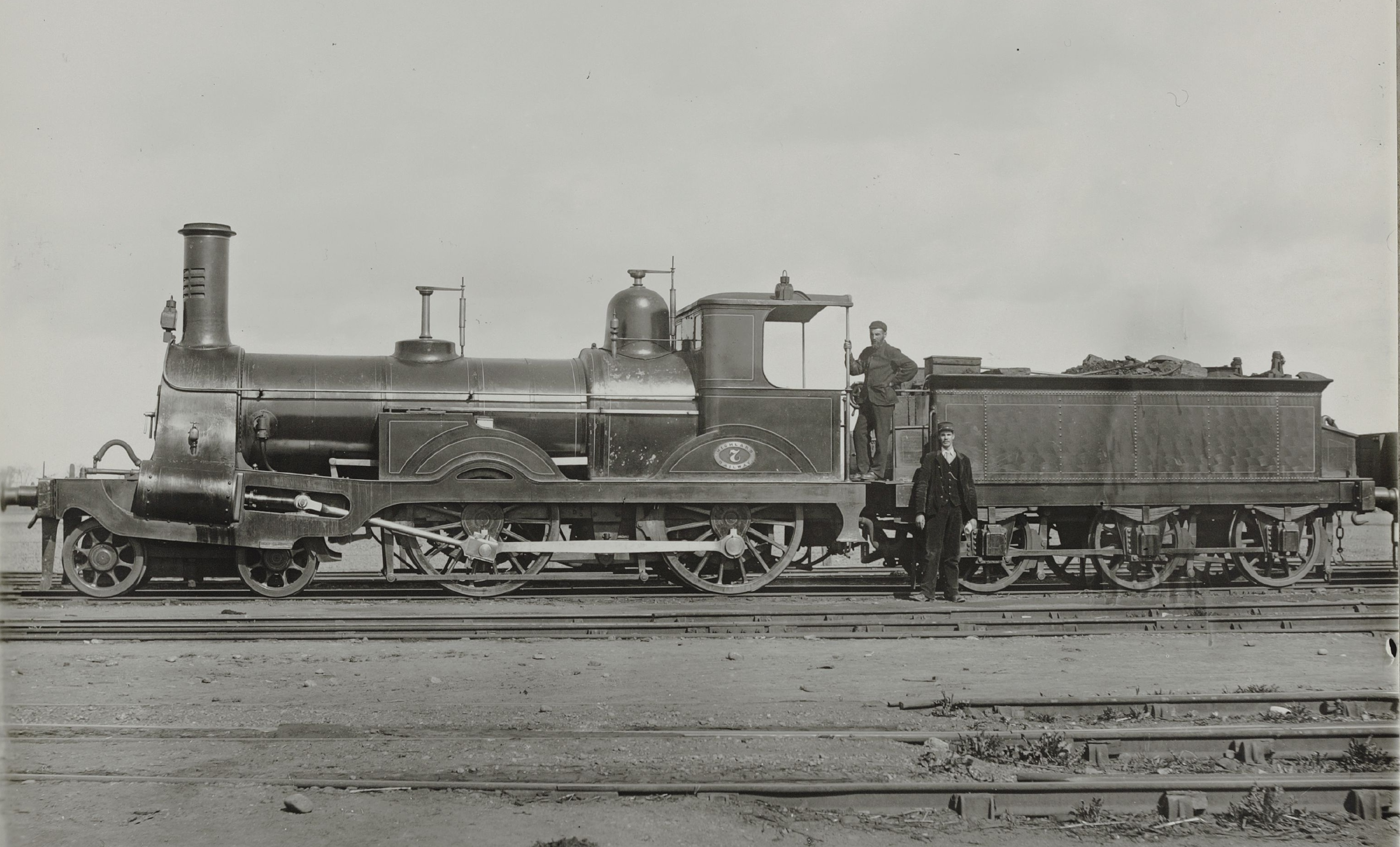
Type and origin
- Power type: Steam
- Designer: David Jones
- Builder: HR Lochgorm Works
- Build date: 1882–1901
- Total produced: 9
Specifications
- Configuration
  - Whyte: 4-4-0
  - UIC: 2′B
- Gauge: 4 ft 8 1/2 in (1,435 mm)
- Leading dia.: 3 ft 3 1/2 in (1.003 m)
- Driver dia.: 5 ft 3 in (1.600 m)
- Loco weight: 43 long tons 0 cwt (96,300 lb or 43.7 t)
- Boiler: 4 ft 2 in (1.27 m) diameter
- Boiler pressure: 150 lbf/in^{2} (1.03 MPa)
- Heating surface: 1,216 sq ft (113.0 m^{2})
- Cylinders: Two, outside
- Cylinder size: 18 in × 24 in (457 mm × 610 mm)
Performance figures
- Tractive effort: 14,037 lbf (62.44 kN)
Career
- Operators: HR → LMS
- Class: HR: ‘Skye Bogie’; L (from 1901)
- Power class: LMS: 1P
- Number in class: 1 January 1923: 8
- Nicknames: Skye Bogies
- Withdrawn: 1922–1930
- Disposition: All scrapped

The Highland Railway L class, also known as ‘Skye Bogies’ due to their association with the Kyle of Lochalsh Line. They were essentially mixed traffic versions of the earlier Duke or F class.

== Construction ==
Nine were built at Lochgorm Works over the period 1882 to 1901. They were never named.

== Dimensions ==
The 18-by-24-inch (457 mm × 610 mm) cylinders, valve gear and motion were common to the two classes, but they had smaller 5-foot-3-inch (1,600 mm) driving wheels and higher pressure 150-pound-force-per-square-inch (1,030 kPa) boilers.

== Numbering ==
Table of locomotives
HR Number	Date New	LMS Number	Withdrawn	Notes
70	May 1882	14277	1930	Swapped numbers with 67 c.1916
85	August 1892	—	1923	Renumbered 85A in 1919
86	March 1893	14279	1927	
87	December 1893	14280	1926	Withdrawn before renumbered by the LMS
88	April 1895	14281	1926	Withdrawn before renumbered by the LMS
5	August 1897	14282	1929	Renumbered 32 in 1899
6	November 1897	14283	1929	Renumbered 33 in 1899
7	July 1898	14284	1930	Renumbered 34 in 1899
48	December 1901	14285	1928	
