= Clyde Locomotive Company =

Locomotive manufacturer in Scotland, 1884–1888

Coordinates: 55.8807°N 4.2248°W

- Industry: Steam locomotives
- Founded: 1884
- Founder: Walter Montgomerie Neilson
- Defunct: 1888
- Fate: Acquired
- Successor: Sharp, Stewart and Company
- Headquarters: Glasgow, Scotland
- Area served: Worldwide

The Clyde Locomotive Company was a firm of locomotive manufacturers in Springburn, Glasgow, Scotland.

The company was founded in 1884 by Walter Montgomerie Neilson, after he left the partnership of Neilson, Reid and Company in 1876 following a disagreement with James Reid.

In 1886, the first locomotives were built; these were a class of eight 4-4-0s for the Highland Railway, known as the Clyde Bogies. Two locomotives built in 1887, which had been ordered by the Girvan and Portpatrick Junction Railway, were delivered to that company's successor, the Ayrshire and Wigtownshire Railway.

In 1888, the long established engineering firm Sharp, Stewart and Company wanted to expand, but finding it impossible to extend their existing Atlas Works in Manchester (which had no direct rail access), they decided to move to Glasgow; they bought the Clyde Locomotive Co. and renamed it Atlas Works after their former premises. When Sharp Stewart amalgamated with other firms in 1903 to form the North British Locomotive Company, the Atlas Works continued to build locomotives until its closure in 1923.

== Locomotive orders ==
Between 1886 and 1888, eight orders were received, only five of which (totalling fourteen locomotives) were completed by the Clyde Locomotive Co.; the last three orders were completed by Sharp Stewart & Co.

| Order no. | Type | Customer | Total | Notes |
|---|---|---|---|---|
| E1 | 4-4-0 | Highland Railway | 8 | Highland Railway E Class |
| E2 | 0-4-0ST | John McAndrew, Dalzell; Watt & Wilson, Greenock | 2 | |
| E3 | 0-4-0ST | Eglinton Iron Co., Santander | 1 | |
| E4 | 0-6-0ST | Dowlais Ironworks | 1 | |
| E5 | 0-6-0 | Ayrshire & Wigtownshire Railway | 2 | |
| E6 | 4-4-0 | Brazilian Government Railway | 8 | Sharp Stewart works nos. 3291–8 |
| E7 | 4-4-0 | Argentine Central Railway | 6 | Sharp Stewart works nos. 3424–9. Metre gauge |
| E8 | 2-6-0 | Uruguay Northern Railway | 2 | Sharp Stewart works nos. 3430–1 |
