= Highland Railway Jones Goods Class =

Class of 15 British 4-6-0 steam locomotives

Highland Railway Big Goods or class I "Jones Goods"
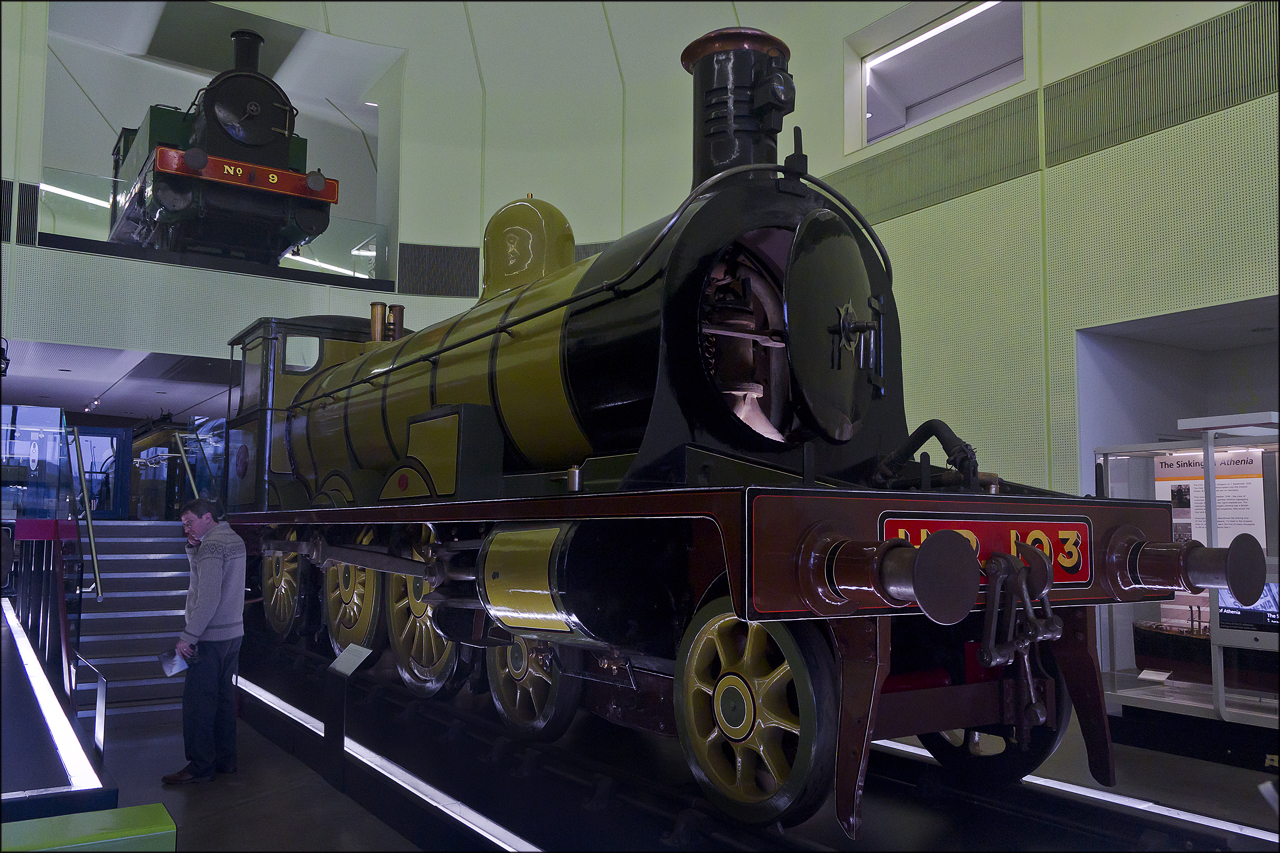
- Preserved No. 103 inside the Riverside Museum
Type and origin
- Power type: Steam
- Designer: David Jones
- Builder: Sharp, Stewart & Co.
- Serial number: 4022–4036
- Build date: 1894
- Total produced: 15
Specifications
- Configuration
  - Whyte: 4-6-0
  - UIC: 2′C n2
- Gauge: 4 ft 8 1/2 in (1,435 mm)
- Leading dia.: 3 ft 2 1/2 in (0.978 m)
- Driver dia.: 5 ft 3 in (1.600 m)
- Loco weight: 56 long tons 0 cwt (125,400 lb or 56.9 t)
- Water cap.: 3,000 imperial gallons (14,000 L; 3,600 US gal)
- Boiler: 4 ft 7 7/8 in (1.42 m) diameter
- Boiler pressure: 170 lbf/in^{2} (1.17 MPa), later 175 lbf/in^{2} (1.21 MPa)
- Heating surface: 1,672.5 sq ft (155.38 m^{2})
- Cylinders: Two, outside
- Cylinder size: 20 in × 26 in (508 mm × 660 mm)
- Valve gear: Stephenson
- Valve type: Slide valves
Performance figures
- Tractive effort: 24,555 lbf (109.23 kN)
Career
- Operators: Highland Railway; London, Midland & Scottish; British Railways (Only as a preserved loco)
- Class: HR: Big Goods; I (from 1901)
- Power class: LMS: 4F
- Numbers: HR: 103–117; LMS: 17916–17930
- Withdrawn: 1929–1940
- Disposition: One preserved, remainder scrapped

The Highland Railway Jones Goods class was a class of steam locomotive, and was notable as the first class with a 4-6-0 wheel arrangement in the British Isles. Fifteen were built, and one has survived to preservation. Originally known as the Big Goods class, they became class I under Peter Drummond's 1901 classification scheme.

Fifteen locomotives were built by Sharp, Stewart and Company and delivered between September and November 1894, numbered 103 to 117. At the time, these were the most powerful main line engines in the country. Originally intended principally as freight engines, they were often called upon for passenger duties during the wide fluctuations of traffic which occurred on the Highland Railway, particularly during the summer season.

== Overview ==
The 4-6-0 wheel arrangement had its origins in the United States, and its introduction to Britain was the work of the Highland Railway's locomotive superintendent David Jones. When the 'Jones Goods' first appeared they were felt to be somewhat daring as they were such an advance on anything that Jones or the Highland Railway had previously built.

Although the type was a notable success for Jones, an accident while testing one of the locomotives caused one of his legs to be severely scalded. Although he recovered, he was permanently affected and by the end of December 1896 had retired due to ill-health.

== Dimensions ==
Boiler pressure was 175 pounds-force per square inch (1.21 MPa) — the previous highest on the Highland being 160 pounds-force per square inch (1.10 MPa). Outside cylinders were 20-by-26-inch (508 by 660 mm), bore by stroke – the previous largest being 18-by-24-inch (457 by 610 mm). Driving wheels were 5 feet 3 inches (1,600 mm) in diameter — the HR standard for freight locomotives. Additionally the boiler and chassis were significantly longer than anything previously attempted by the company. It was also the first tender locomotive for the railway not to have Allan double frames and inclined cylinders beside the smokebox.

== Transfer to LMS ==
The class was numbered 17916–17930 and given power classification '4F' by the London, Midland and Scottish Railway (LMS). They were withdrawn between 1929 and 1940.

== Preservation ==
The first of the class, Number 103, (LMS 17916) was set aside for preservation by the LMS in 1934. It was restored to working order by British Railways in 1959 and spent several years operating enthusiasts' tours. During this time, it appeared in the 1965 film Those Magnificent Men in their Flying Machines, playing the part of a French locomotive, complete with NORD lettering on the tender. It was finally retired in 1966 and is today in the Riverside Museum in Glasgow. In addition to being the very first British 4-6-0, no. 103 has since 1966 also had the less positive distinction of being the only former Highland Railway locomotive still in existence.

== Models ==
Rapido Trains makes a model, first announced on 15 February 2022, of the Jones Goods for OO gauge. It is available in liveries from across the class's lifespan, including Number 103 as preserved.

In 4mm/1ft there is a whitemetal kit is available from DJH Models and there was an etched brass kit in 4mm/1ft scale available from Falcon Brass but this is no longer available.
