= Highland Railway Clan Class =

Series of steam locomotives built 1919–1921

Highland Railway Clan class
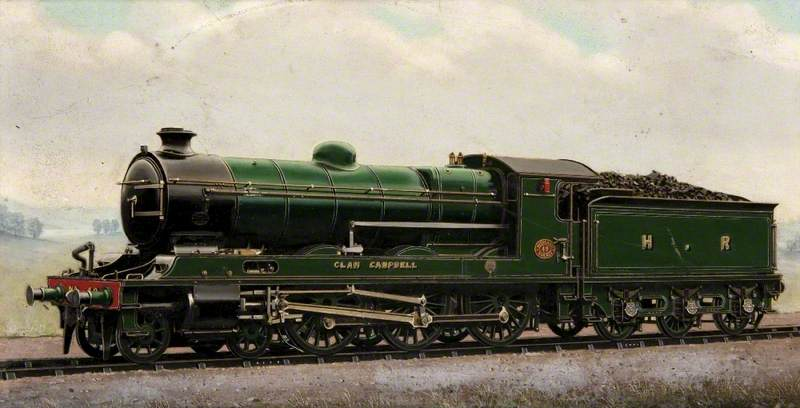
- No. 49 Clan Campbell
Type and origin
- Power type: Steam
- Designer: Christopher Cumming
- Builder: R. & W. Hawthorn, Leslie and Company
- Serial number: 3329–3332, 3443–3446
- Build date: 1919 (4), 1921 (4)
- Total produced: 8
Specifications
- Configuration
  - Whyte: 4-6-0
  - UIC: 2′C h2
- Gauge: 4 ft 8 1/2 in (1,435 mm) standard gauge
- Leading dia.: 3 ft 0 in (0.914 m)
- Driver dia.: 6 ft 0 in (1.829 m)
- Loco weight: 63.25 long tons (64.26 t; 70.84 short tons)
- Tender weight: 42 long tons (43 t; 47 short tons)
- Firebox
  - Grate area: 25.5 sq ft (2.37 m^{2})
- Boiler: 4 ft 9 3/16 in (1.453 m) diameter, with 1 1/8 in (29 mm) taper
- Boiler pressure: 175 psi (1.21 MPa)
- Heating surface: 1,467 sq ft (136.3 m^{2})
- Superheater
  - Type: Robinson
  - Heating area: 256 sq ft (23.8 m^{2})
- Cylinders: Two, outside
- Cylinder size: 21 in × 26 in (533 mm × 660 mm)
- Valve gear: Walschaerts
- Valve type: 10 in (254 mm) piston valves
Performance figures
- Tractive effort: 23,688 lbf (105.37 kN)
Career
- Operators: HR → LMS → BR
- Power class: LMS/BR: 4P
- Numbers: HR: 49, 51–57; LMS: 14762–14769; BR: 54767
- Withdrawn: 1943–1950
- Disposition: All scrapped

The Highland Railway's Clan Class was a class of passenger 4-6-0 steam locomotives designed by Christopher Cumming. The design is derived from that of the slightly earlier Clan Goods although the similarity is more visual than real. The first four were built in 1919, and the remaining four in 1921.

== Dimensions ==
They had 21-by-26-inch (533 by 660 mm) cylinders outside with outside Walschaerts valve gear, 6 ft 0 in (1.83 m) driving wheels and a boiler pressured to 175 psi (1.21 MPa). Weight was 62 long tons 5 cwt (139,400 lb or 63.2 t) for the locomotive and 42 long tons (43 t; 47 short tons) for the tender. Piston valve diameter is given as 10 inches (254 mm) (quite large for the period), but they had the conventional short lap, short travel valves. Bearing in mind that they probably spent a large part of their time slogging uphill or coasting down this was probably not too important. Total evaporative heating surface is given as 1,467 sq ft (136.3 m^{2}), plus 256 sq ft (23.8 m^{2}) for the Robinson type superheater, and grate area as 25.5 sq ft (2.37 m^{2}).

== Oil firing ==
Early in 1921 Clan Stewart was used for experiments with oil firing. This seems to have been successful, but was not applied to any other locomotives. Just when Clan Stewart reverted to coal operation does not seem to be recorded.

== Transfer to LMS ==
The locomotives passed to the London, Midland and Scottish Railway (LMS) in 1923. The LMS classified them '4P'.

== Transfer to BR ==
Two survived into British Railways (BR) hands in 1948, but only Clan Mackinnon received its BR number. Some of the Clan names were later reapplied to the BR Standard Class 6.

== Numbering ==
HR Number	Name	Built	LMS Number	BR number	Withdrawn	Notes
49	Clan Campbell	1919	14762	—	June 1947	
51	Clan Fraser	1919	14763	—	August 1944	
52	Clan Munro	1919	14764	54764	February 1948	BR number not applied
53	Clan Stewart	1919	14765	—	February 1945	
54	Clan Chattan	1921	14766	—	April 1944	
55	Clan Mackinnon	1921	14767	54767	January 1950	
56	Clan Mackenzie	1921	14768	—	March 1945	
57	Clan Cameron	1921	14769	—	November 1943	
