= Highland Railway Clan Goods Class =

Class of steam locomotive designed by Christopher Cumming

Highland Railway 'Clan Goods'
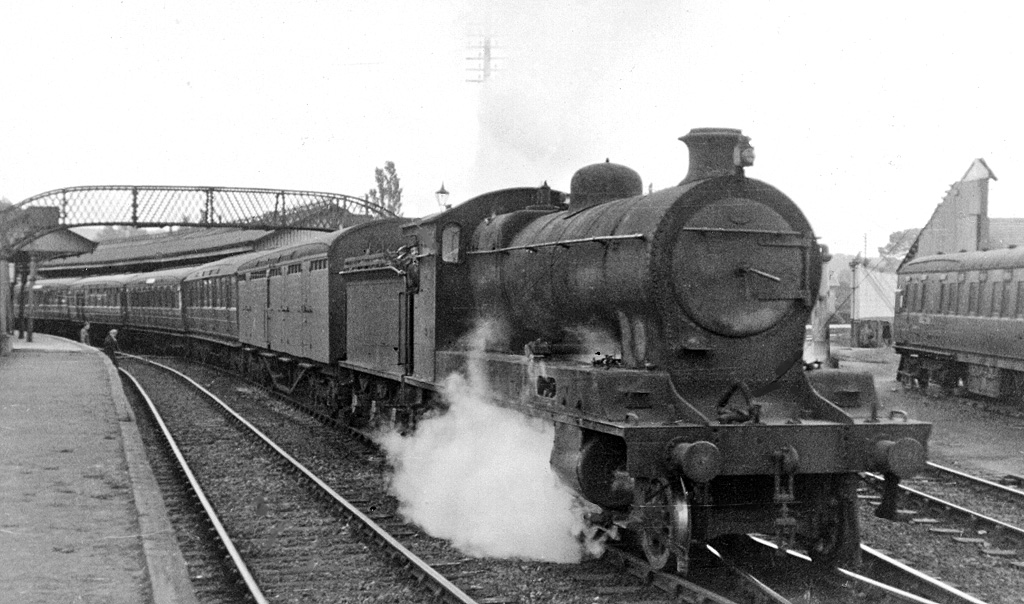
- 'Clan Goods' on an Aberdeen to Inverness express in 1948
Type and origin
- Power type: Steam
- Designer: Christopher Cumming
- Builder: Hawthorn Leslie and Company
- Serial number: 3286–3289, 3371–3374
- Build date: 1918–1919
- Total produced: 8
Specifications
- Configuration
  - Whyte: 4-6-0
- Gauge: 4 ft 8 1/2 in (1,435 mm) standard gauge
- Leading dia.: 3 ft 0 in (0.914 m)
- Driver dia.: 5 ft 3 in (1.600 m)
- Loco weight: 56 long tons 9 cwt (126,400 lb or 57.4 t) (126,400 pounds or 57.3 tonnes or 63.2 short tons)
- Water cap.: 3,000 imp gal (14,000 L; 3,600 US gal)
- Boiler: 4 ft 7 3/16 in (1.402 m) diameter, with 1 1/8 in (29 mm) taper
- Boiler pressure: 175 lbf/in^{2} (1.21 MPa)
- Heating surface: 1,199 sq ft (111.4 m^{2})
- Superheater
  - Type: Robinson
  - Heating area: 241 sq ft (22.4 m^{2})
- Cylinders: Two, outside
- Cylinder size: 20 1/2 in × 26 in (521 mm × 660 mm)
- Valve gear: Walschaerts
Performance figures
- Tractive effort: 25,800 lbf (114.8 kN)
Career
- Operators: HR → LMS → BR
- Power class: LMS: 5F
- Numbers: HR: 75–82; LMS: 17950–17957; BR: 57950–51/54–56
- Withdrawn: 1946–1952
- Disposition: All scrapped

The Highland Railway's Clan Goods class was a class of steam locomotive. They were designed by Christopher Cumming. The first four (Nos 75 to 78) were built by Hawthorn Leslie and Company on Tyneside, and the maker's plates bore the date 1917, but because of wartime delays were not delivered until 1918. Four more (Nos. 79 to 82) were built in 1919, also by Hawthorn Leslie.

== Dimensions ==
They featured two Robinson type 20 1/2 by 26 in (521 by 660 mm) cylinders outside (with long tail-rods), 5 ft 3 in (1.6 m) driving wheel and a boiler set at 175 lbf/in^{2} (1.21 MPa). Locomotive weight was 56 long tons 9 cwt (126,400 lb or 57.4 t).

== Transfer to LMS ==
All eight entered service with the London, Midland and Scottish Railway (LMS) in January 1923. They were classified '5F' by the LMS.

== Transfer to BR ==
Six locomotives survived to enter British Railways (BR) service in 1948, of which five were given BR numbers.

== Numbering ==
Table of locomotives
HR No.	Built	LMS No.	BR No.	Withdrawn	Notes
75	1918	17950	57950	August 1950	
76	1918	17951	57951	May 1951	
77	1918	17952	—	October 1946	
78	1918	17953	57953	October 1948	Withdrawn before BR number applied
79	1918	17954	57954	October 1952	
80	1919	17955	57955	June 1952	
81	1919	17956	57956	May 1952	
82	1919	17957	—	March 1946	
