= Highland Railway P class =

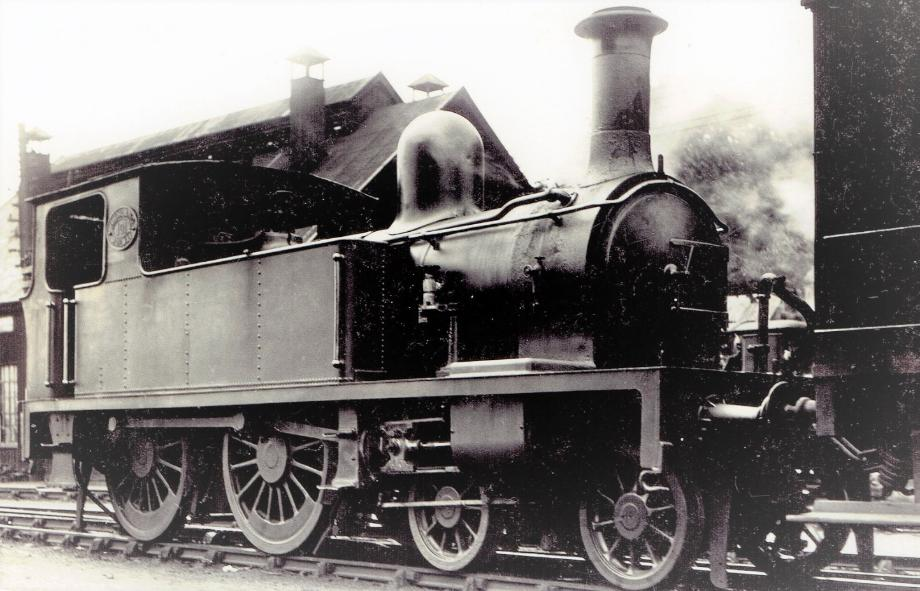
Type and origin
- Power type: Steam
- Builder: Dübs & Co.
- Serial number: 2778–2779, 3077–3079
- Build date: 1891 (2), 1893 (3)
- Total produced: 5
Specifications
- Configuration
  - Whyte: 4-4-0T
  - UIC: 2′B n2t
- Gauge: 4 ft 8 1/2 in (1,435 mm)
- Leading dia.: 3 ft 0 in (914 mm)
- Driver dia.: 5 ft 3 in (1,600 mm)
- Loco weight: 1891 locos: 41 long tons 12 cwt (93,200 lb or 42.3 t), 1893 locos: 44 long tons 0 cwt (98,600 lb or 44.7 t)
- Boiler: 3 ft 10 in (1.17 m) inside diameter
- Boiler pressure: 140 lbf/in^{2} (0.97 MPa)
- Heating surface: 883 sq ft (82.0 m^{2})
- Cylinders: Two, outside
- Cylinder size: 16 in × 22 in (406 mm × 559 mm)
- Valve gear: Stephenson
Performance figures
- Tractive effort: 10,638 lbf (47.32 kN)
Career
- Operators: Highland Railway → London, Midland & Scottish
- Class: HR: P (from 1901)
- Power class: LMS: Unclassified
- Numbers: LMS: 15013–15017
- Nicknames: Yankee Tanks
- Withdrawn: 1924–1934

The Highland Railway P class was a group of five 4-4-0T steam locomotives built in 1891 and 1893 by Dübs and Company of Glasgow.

== History ==
In 1891 Dübs and Company of Glasgow completed two 4-4-0T locomotives. They were part of an order for five for the Uruguay Eastern Railway, but due to financial problems the order was cancelled and the engines were offered for sale.

The locomotives were purchased by the Highland Railway in 1892, where they were numbered 101 and 102. Although their cowcatchers and large headlights were removed before entering service, they retained a somewhat American appearance quite unlike other HR designs of the period, lacking the classic Allan framing and sweep of plating from the widest part of the smokebox to the cylinders. They were nicknamed Yankees, although the official designation from 1901 was 'P' Class.

Three further locomotives were delivered by Dübs in 1893, possibly comprising the balance of the Uruguay order. These had standard Highland Railway fittings but were otherwise identical to the first two. They were originally numbered 11, 14 and 15, but were renumbered 51, 50 and 52 in 1899–1900, and 50 was again renumbered to 54 in 1901.

== Dimensions ==
The locomotives had 5 ft 3 in (1,600 mm) driving wheels and 16 in × 22 in (406 mm × 559 mm) outside cylinders. Boiler pressure was 140 lbf/in^{2} (970 kPa) and weight in working order was 41 long tons 12 cwt (93,200 lb or 42.3 t).

== Use ==
They were used on branch line services, including those to Burghead, Fortrose, Portessie and Aberfeldy. One (no. 52) was used on the Invergarry and Fort Augustus Railway while that line was leased to the Highland.

== Transfer to LMS ==
In 1923 they passed to the London, Midland and Scottish Railway (LMS) and became LMS 15013–15017. They were withdrawn between 1924 and 1934.

== Numbering ==
Table of locomotives
HR No.	Date new	LMS No.	Withdrawn	Notes
101	September 1892	15013	1934	
102	September 1892	15014	1934	Named Munlochy in 1910; name later removed
11	November 1893	15015	1924	Renumbered 51 in 1899, 51A in 1919, 51B in 1919. Withdrawn before LMS number applied
14	November 1893	15017	1924	Named Portessie in 1901; name later removed. Renumbered 50 in 1900, 54 in 1901, 54B in 1921.
15	November 1893	15016	1927	Named Fortrose in 1901; name later removed. Renumbered 52 in 1900, 52A in 1919, 52B in 1921.
