= Highland Railway E Class =

Highland Railway Bruce or E class
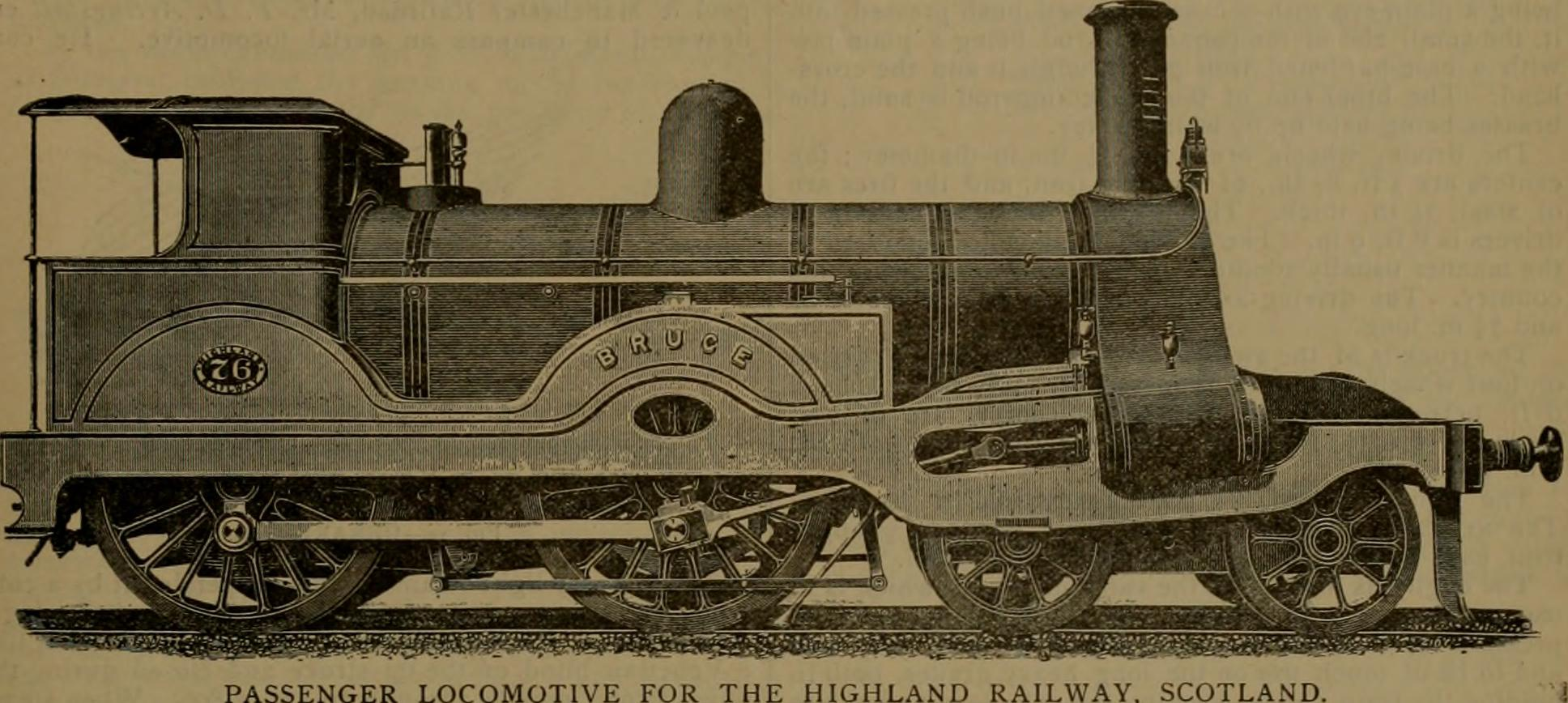
Type and origin
- Power type: Steam
- Designer: David Jones
- Builder: Clyde Locomotive Company
- Serial number: 1–8
- Build date: 1886
- Total produced: 8
Specifications
- Configuration
  - Whyte: 4-4-0
  - UIC: 2′B n2
- Gauge: 4 ft 8 1/2 in (1,435 mm) standard gauge
- Leading dia.: 3 ft 9 1/2 in (1.156 m)
- Driver dia.: 6 ft 3 in (1,905 mm)
- Loco weight: 43 long tons (44 t; 48 short tons)
- Water cap.: 2,250 imp gal (10,200 L; 2,700 US gal)
- Boiler: 4 ft 2 in (1.27 m) diameter, 9 ft 9 1/2 in (2.98 m) between tubeplates
- Boiler pressure: 160 lbf/in^{2} (1.10 MPa)
- Heating surface: 1,140 sq ft (106 m^{2})
- Cylinders: Two (outside)
- Cylinder size: 18 in × 24 in (457 mm × 610 mm)
- Valve gear: Stephenson
Performance figures
- Tractive effort: 14,100 lbf (62.72 kN)
Career
- Operators: Highland Railway; London, Midland & Scottish
- Class: HR: Bruce; E (from 1901)
- Power class: LMS: 1P
- Nicknames: Clyde Bogies
- Withdrawn: 1923-1930
- Disposition: All scrapped

The Highland Railway E Class was a class of 4-4-0 steam locomotive designed by David Jones for passenger service. They were also known as the 'Clyde Bogies' as they were built by the Clyde Locomotive Company in Glasgow, Scotland. They were the first locomotives built by that company.

Built in 1886, they were a development of Jones' previous F Class. Originally known as the Bruce class, they were assigned to Class E under Drummond's locomotive classification scheme of 1901.

== Dimensions ==
The boiler pressure was 160 lbf/in^{2} (1,100 kPa), the cylinders were 18 by 24 inches (457 mm × 610 mm), and the driving wheel diameter was 6 feet 3 1/2 inches (1,918 mm).

== Numbering ==
Table of locomotives
HR Number	Name	Entered service	Withdrawn	Notes
76	Bruce	December 1886	1924	Displayed at the International Exhibition of Industry, Science and Art, Edinburgh 1886. Renumbered 76A in 1917
77	Lovat	May 1886	1923	Withdrawn and reinstated in 1915. Renumbered 77A in 1917
78	Lochalsh	June 1886	1923	Renumbered 78A in 1917
79	Atholl	June 1886	1923	Renumbered 79A in 1917
80	Stafford	July 1886	1923	Renumbered 80A in 1919
81	Colville	July 1886	1924	Renumbered 81A in 1919
82	Fife	September 1886	1930	Renamed Durn in 1908; name removed 1917. Renumbered 82A in 1917, and 14278 by LMS
83	Cadboll	October 1886	1923	Renamed Monkland in 1902. Renumbered 83A in 1917

== Transfer to LMS ==
All were still in service at the end of 1922, but when the Highland Railway engines passed to the London, Midland and Scottish Railway (LMS) on 1 September 1923, five had been withdrawn. Numbers 76A and 81A were withdrawn in 1924, but only 82A survived long enough to carry its LMS number (14278) – it was withdrawn in April 1930. No 79A was withdrawn in 1923 and stored at Aviemore until being scrapped at Kilmarnock in 1925.
