= Highland Railway F Class =

Highland Railway F class
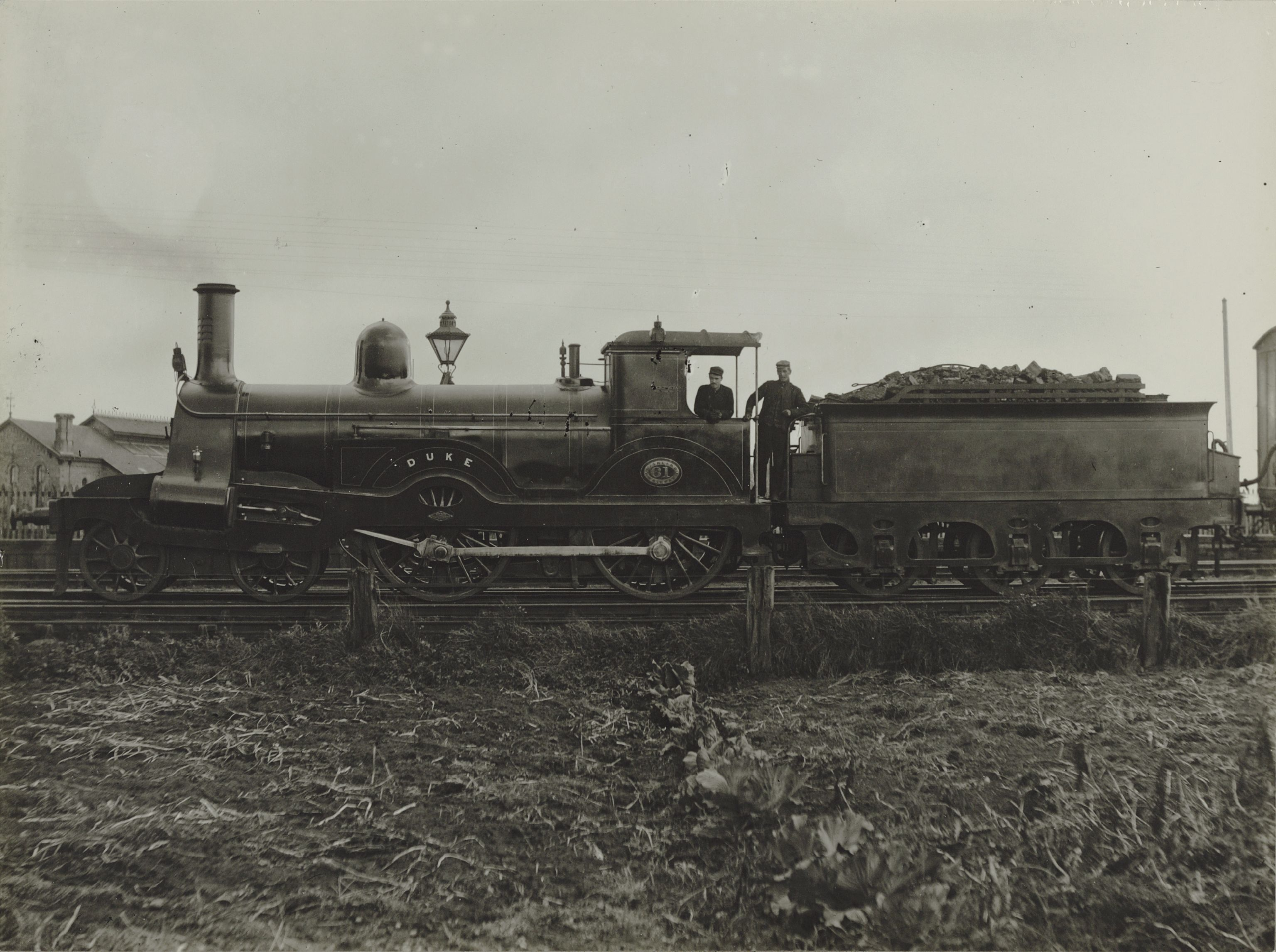
Type and origin
- Power type: Steam
- Designer: David Jones
- Builder: Dübs & Co. (10); HR Lochgorm Works (7)
- Serial number: Dübs: 714–723
- Build date: 1874 (10), 1876–1888 (7)
- Total produced: 17
Specifications
- Configuration
  - Whyte: 4-4-0
  - UIC: 2′B n2
- Gauge: 4 ft 8 1/2 in (1,435 mm)
- Leading dia.: 3 ft 3 1/2 in (1.003 m)
- Driver dia.: 6 ft 3 1/2 in (1.918 m)
- Loco weight: 41 long tons 0 cwt (91,800 lb or 41.7 t)
- Water cap.: 1,800 imp gal (8,200 L; 2,200 US gal)
- Boiler: 4 ft 2 in (1.27 m) diameter
- Boiler pressure: 140–150 lbf/in^{2} (0.97–1.03 MPa)
- Heating surface: 1,228 sq ft (114.1 m^{2})
- Cylinders: Two, outside
- Cylinder size: 18 in × 24 in (457 mm × 610 mm)
- Valve gear: Allan
Career
- Operators: Highland Railway; London, Midland & Scottish
- Class: HR: Duke; F (from 1901)
- Numbers: HR: 60–69, 4 (→ 31), 71–75, 84
- Withdrawn: 1907-1923
- Disposition: All scrapped

The Highland Railway F class 4-4-0s were a class of British steam locomotives introduced in 1874. The first 10 were built by Dübs and Company in 1874. A further seven were built in Lochgorm works between 1876 and 1888. Originally they were the first Bruce class, and later became known as the Duke class to avoid confusion with the second Bruce class. As part of Peter Drummond's 1901 classification scheme they became class F.

== Dimensions ==
They featured 6-feet 3½-inch driving wheels and weighed 41 long tons (42 t; 46 short tons). The original batch had boilers pressed to 140 pounds-force per square inch (970 kPa), the later batch had slightly smaller boilers but a higher pressure of 150 lbf/in^{2} (1,030 kPa). Of typical Allan/Jones appearance, they had outside cylinders of 18 by 24 inches (457 by 610 mm).

== Disposal ==
Withdrawal commenced in 1907, and by 1909 all-but-one of the Dübs-built examples had been withdrawn. Numbers 31A and 74 were retired in 1913, number 71A was broken up in 1915. The remaining five survived until 1923 but none of them acquired a new London, Midland and Scottish Railway number.

== Numbering ==
Table of locomotives
HR No.	First name	Manufacturer	Serial No.	Date new	Date withdrawn	Notes
60	Bruce	Dübs & Co.	714	June 1874	1909	Renamed Sutherland in 1884
61	Sutherlandshire	Dübs & Co.	715	June 1874	1907	Renamed Duke in 1877
62	Perthshire	Dübs & Co.	716	June 1874	1909	Renamed Stemster in 1889, Huntingtower in 1899, and Aultwherrie in 1903
63	Inverness-shire	Dübs & Co.	717	July 1874	1907	Renamed Inverness
64	Morayshire	Dübs & Co.	718	July 1874	1909	Renamed Seafield c. 1889
65	Nairnshire	Dübs & Co.	719	July 1874	1909	Renamed Dalraddy
66	Ross-shire	Dübs & Co.	720	July 1874	1907	Renamed Ardvuela
67	The Duke	Dübs & Co.	721	August 1874	1923	Renamed Cromartie in 1877. Renumbered 67A in 1918, 70A in 1923.
68	Caithness-shire	Dübs & Co.	722	August 1874	1907	Renamed Caithness, then Muirtown
69	The Lord Provost	Dübs & Co.	723	August 1874	1909	Renamed Sir James, then Aldourie
4	Ardross	Lochgorm	—	July 1876	1913	Renamed Auchtertyre in 1901. Renumbered 31 in 1899, and 31A in 1911.
71	Clachnacuddin	Lochgorm	—	December 1883	1915	Renumbered 71A in 1912
72	Bruce	Lochgorm	—	June 1884	1923	Renamed Grange c. 1886. Renumbered 72A in 1915
73	Thurlow	Lochgorm	—	February 1885	1923	Name removed at unknown date; renamed Rosehaugh in 1898. Renumbered 73A in 1916
74	Beaufort	Lochgorm	—	September 1885	1913	Name removed at unknown date
75	Breadalbane	Lochgorm	—	October 1886	1923	Renumbered 75A in 1917
84	Dochfour	Lochgorm	—	December 1888	1923	Renumbered 84A in 1917
