= David Jones (railway) =

Locomotive Superintendent for the Highland Railway in Scotland

- Born: 25 October 1834; Manchester
- Died: 2 December 1906 (aged 72); London
- Engineering career
- Discipline: Locomotive engineering

David Jones (25 October 1834 - 2 December 1906) was born in Manchester, England, where his father was an engineer. He became Locomotive Superintendent for the Highland Railway in Scotland. He was credited with the design of the first British 4-6-0 which was strongly influenced by a Scottish locomotive design for Indian Railways.

== Career ==
=== London and North Western Railway ===
Jones spent part of his apprenticeship under John Ramsbottom, the district superintendent of the North Eastern Division of London and North Western Railway.

=== Highland Railway ===
He joined what would later become the Highland Railway in 1855 at age twenty-one. In 1870, he became its locomotive superintendent and, like most such occupants of that position, spent much of his time rebuilding old engines in order to extract a few more years from them. Although he was a fervent disciple of Alexander Allan, Jones' new designs tended to break away from the Allan tradition, which had lasted so long in Scotland.

=== Locomotive designs ===
In 1894 he introduced the Highland Railway Jones Goods Class, the first 4-6-0 to operate on any British Railway. In 1899 the three Avonside Engine Company 4-6-0 engines built for the North Mount Lyell Railway are attributed in design to Jones

== Accidents and death ==
Jones retired in 1896, after a scalding, experienced during tests of the large goods 4-6-0, had robbed him of the use of his left leg and he died in London in 1906, after a car accident had deprived him the use of his other.

== Notes ==
Preceded by William Stroudley	Chief Mechanical Engineer of the Highland Railway; 1870-1896	Succeeded by Peter Drummond
