= Rectory House =

Building in Dunkeld, Scotland

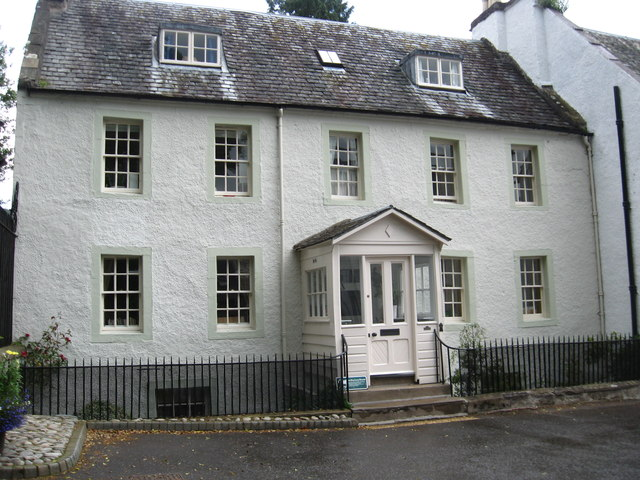
- The building in 2012
- Interactive map of the Rectory House area
- Former names: Dean's House

General information
- Location: Cathedral Street; Dunkeld, Scotland
- Coordinates: 56°33′55″N 3°35′19″W
- Completed: c. 1715 (311 years ago)

Technical details
- Floor count: 2

Other information
- Public transit: Dunkeld and Birnam

Listed Building – Category B
- Official name: Dean's House (now Recory House), Cathedral Street (N.)
- Designated: 5 October 1971
- Reference no.: LB5640

Rectory House, formerly the Dean's House, is a historic building in Dunkeld, Perth and Kinross, Scotland. Standing adjacent to the gates to Dunkeld Cathedral at the western end of Cathedral Street, it is a Category B listed building dating to c. 1715. It is two storeys, with a five-window frontage and later attic dormers.

In 1787, fiddler Niel Gow entertained Robert Burns here.

== See also ==
- List of listed buildings in Dunkeld And Dowally, Perth and Kinross
