= Dunkeld Cathedral Manse =

Building in Dunkeld, Scotland

- Interactive map of the Dunkeld Cathedral Manse area

General information
- Location: Cathedral Street; Dunkeld, Scotland
- Coordinates: 56°33′54″N 3°35′18″W
- Completed: c. 1715 (311 years ago)

Technical details
- Floor count: 2

Other information
- Public transit: Dunkeld and Birnam

Listed Building – Category B
- Official name: Manse, Cathedral Street
- Designated: 5 October 1971
- Reference no.: LB5644

Dunkeld Cathedral Manse is an historic building in Dunkeld, Perth and Kinross, Scotland. Standing near the gates to Dunkeld Cathedral at the western end of Cathedral Street, from which it is set back on its southern side, it is a Category B listed building dating to c. 1715. It is two storeys, with a four-window frontage and single-storey out buildings.

The building was purchased in 1887 as a manse and reconstructed, with designs by James Macintyre Henry.

== See also ==
- List of listed buildings in Dunkeld And Dowally, Perth and Kinross
