= Atholl Arms Hotel, Dunkeld =

Hotel in Dunkeld, Scotland

Atholl Arms Hotel
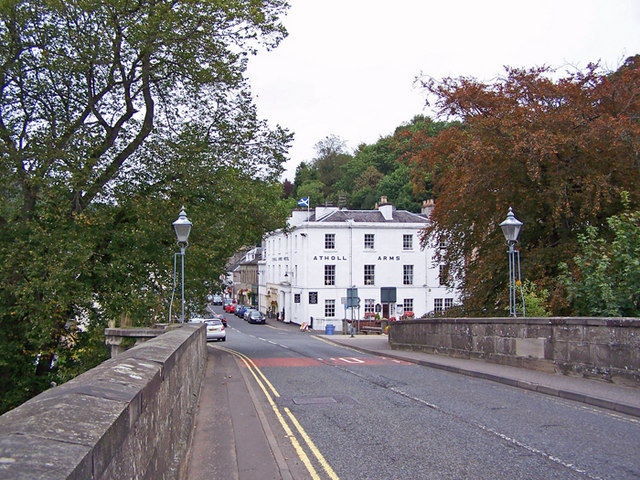
- The hotel viewed from Dunkeld Bridge in 2009
- Interactive map of the Atholl Arms Hotel area

General information
- Type: Hotel and restaurant
- Location: Bridge Street; Dunkeld, Scotland
- Coordinates: 56°33′55″N 3°35′07″W
- Completed: 1833; 193 years ago
- Owner: Zsolt Balogh

Technical details
- Floor count: 3

Other information
- Parking: Free parking
- Public transit: Dunkeld and Birnam

Website
- www.athollarmshotel.com

Listed Building – Category B
- Official name: ATHOLL ARMS HOTEL, BRIDGE ST., AND BOAT ROAD
- Designated: 5 October 1971
- Reference no.: LB5624

The Atholl Arms Hotel is a hotel and restaurant in Dunkeld, Perth and Kinross, Scotland. Standing at the corner of Bridge Street and Boat Road, it is a Category B listed building dating to 1833.

== Gallery ==
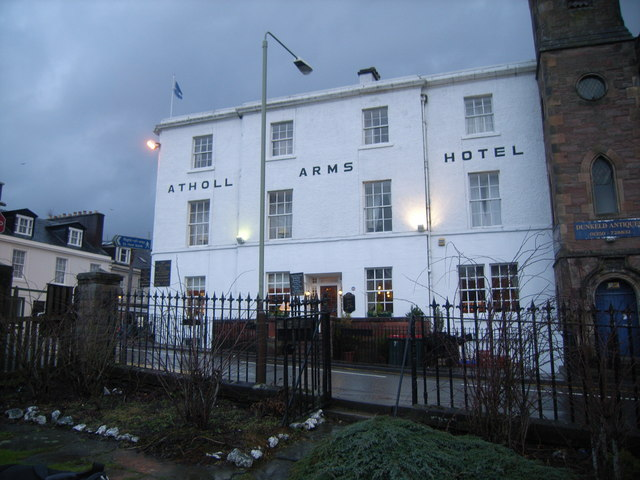
The Boat Road façade, 2008

== See also ==
- List of listed buildings in Dunkeld And Dowally, Perth and Kinross
