= 5–7 Cathedral Street, Dunkeld =

Building in Dunkeld, Scotland

5–7 Cathedral Street
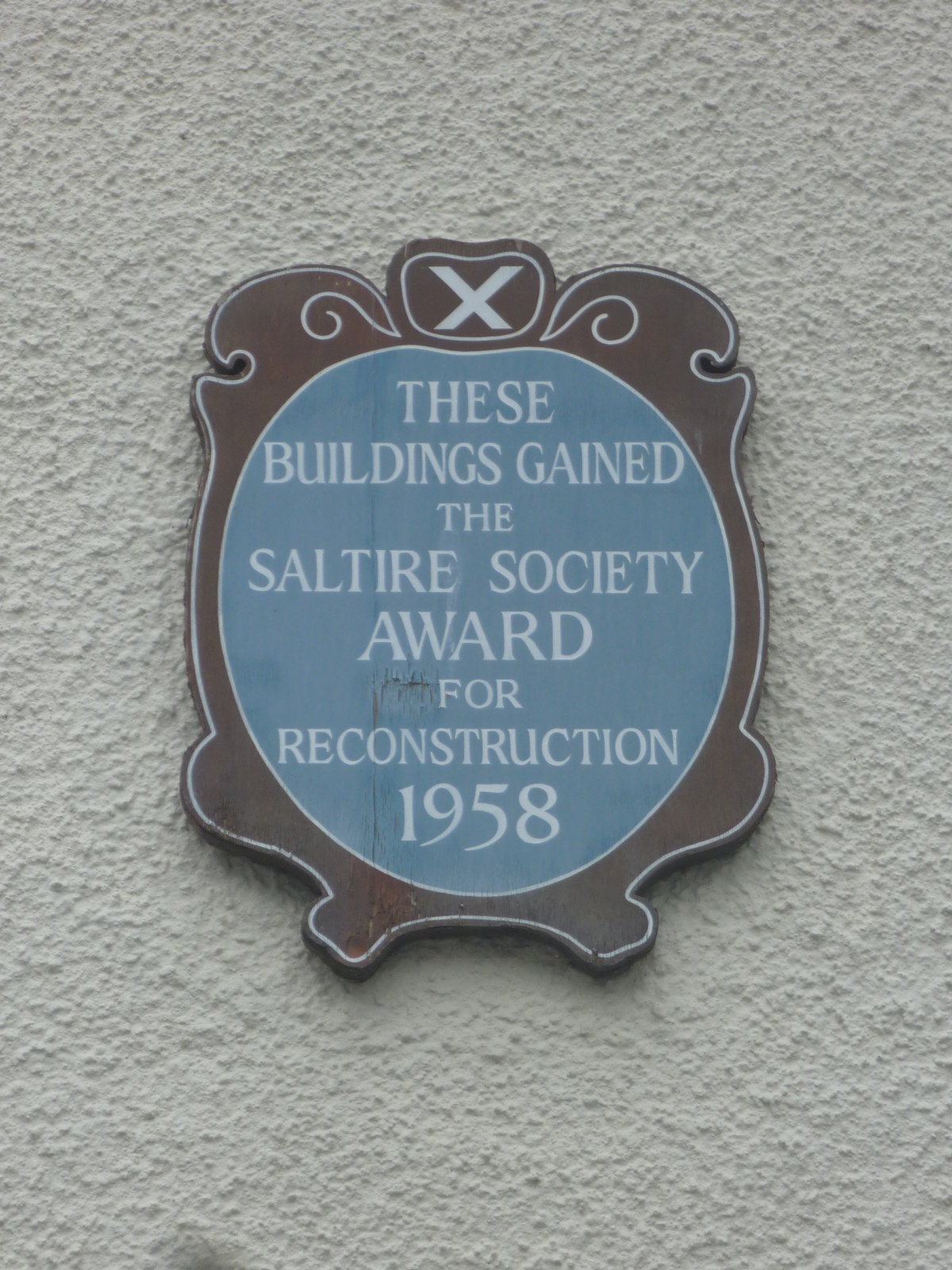
- A plaque on the building
- Interactive map of the 5–7 Cathedral Street area

General information
- Location: Cathedral Street; Dunkeld, Scotland
- Coordinates: 56°33′55″N 3°35′15″W
- Completed: c. 1715 (311 years ago)

Technical details
- Floor count: 2

Other information
- Public transit: Dunkeld and Birnam

Listed Building – Category B
- Official name: 5, 7 Cathedral Street (N.)
- Designated: 5 October 1971
- Reference no.: LB5635

5–7 Cathedral Street is an historic building in Dunkeld, Perth and Kinross, Scotland. Standing on Cathedral Street, it is a Category B listed building dating to c. 1715. It is two storeys, with a five-window frontage (with one light segmentally arched).

Per a plaque on its façade, the building won the Saltire Society Award for Reconstruction in 1958.

== See also ==
- List of listed buildings in Dunkeld And Dowally, Perth and Kinross
