= 6 Cathedral Street, Dunkeld =

Building in Dunkeld, Scotland

6 Cathedral Street
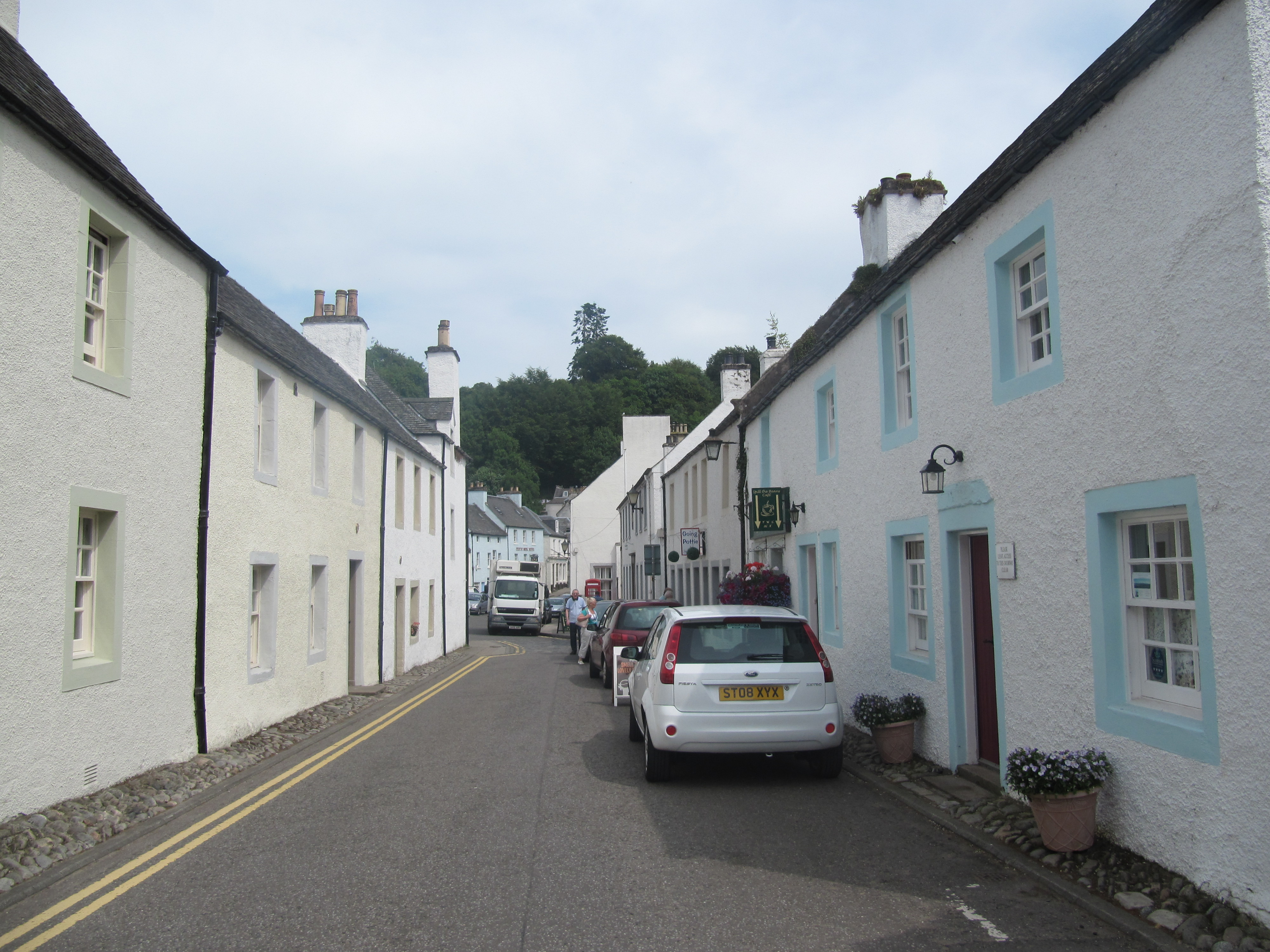
- The building (right) in 2013, looking east to The Cross
- Interactive map of the 6 Cathedral Street area

General information
- Location: Cathedral Street; Dunkeld, Scotland
- Coordinates: 56°33′55″N 3°35′15″W
- Completed: c. 1715 (311 years ago)

Technical details
- Floor count: 2

Other information
- Public transit: Dunkeld and Birnam

Listed Building – Category B
- Official name: 6 Cathedral Street
- Designated: 5 October 1971
- Reference no.: LB5642

6 Cathedral Street is an historic building in Dunkeld, Perth and Kinross, Scotland. Standing on Cathedral Street, it is a Category B listed building dating to c. 1725. It is two storeys, with an inscribed lintel reading "17 JS JC 25". The Dunkeld Lodge Operative 152 was based in this building until 1811.

Water Wynd, which leads to the River Tay, separates this building and number 8.

== See also ==
- List of listed buildings in Dunkeld And Dowally, Perth and Kinross
