= 1 Cathedral Street, Dunkeld =

Building in Dunkeld, Scotland

1 Cathedral Street
- Interactive map of the 1 Cathedral Street area

General information
- Location: Cathedral Street; Dunkeld, Scotland
- Coordinates: 56°33′55″N 3°35′14″W
- Completed: c. 1757 (269 years ago)

Technical details
- Floor count: 2

Other information
- Public transit access: Dunkeld and Birnam

Listed Building – Category B
- Official name: 1 Cathedral Street (North Side)
- Designated: 5 October 1971
- Reference no.: LB5633

1 Cathedral Street is an historic building in Dunkeld, Perth and Kinross, Scotland. Standing on Cathedral Street, it is a Category B listed building dating to c. 1757. It is two storeys, with a three-window frontage.

It was formerly part of St George's Hospital with the adjacent The Ell House.

According to the statutory listing record, the building’s exterior is harled with margin detailing typical of 18th‑century Scottish townhouses, and it retains architectural features that contribute to the historic character of Cathedral Street in Dunkeld.

== See also ==
- List of listed buildings in Dunkeld And Dowally, Perth and Kinross
