= 8–10 Cathedral Street, Dunkeld =

Building in Dunkeld, Scotland

8–10 Cathedral Street
- Interactive map of the 8–10 Cathedral Street area

General information
- Location: Cathedral Street; Dunkeld, Scotland
- Coordinates: 56°33′55″N 3°35′15″W
- Completed: c. 1715 (311 years ago)

Technical details
- Floor count: 2

Other information
- Public transit: Dunkeld and Birnam

Listed Building – Category B
- Official name: 8, 10 Cathedral Street
- Designated: 5 October 1971
- Reference no.: LB5643

8–10 Cathedral Street is an historic building in Dunkeld, Perth and Kinross, Scotland. Standing on Cathedral Street, it is a Category B listed building dating to c. 1715. It is two storeys, with a five-window frontage.

Water Wynd, which leads to the River Tay, separates this building and number 6.

== See also ==
- List of listed buildings in Dunkeld And Dowally, Perth and Kinross
