= 18–20 Cathedral Street, Dunkeld =

Building in Dunkeld, Scotland

18–20 Cathedral Street
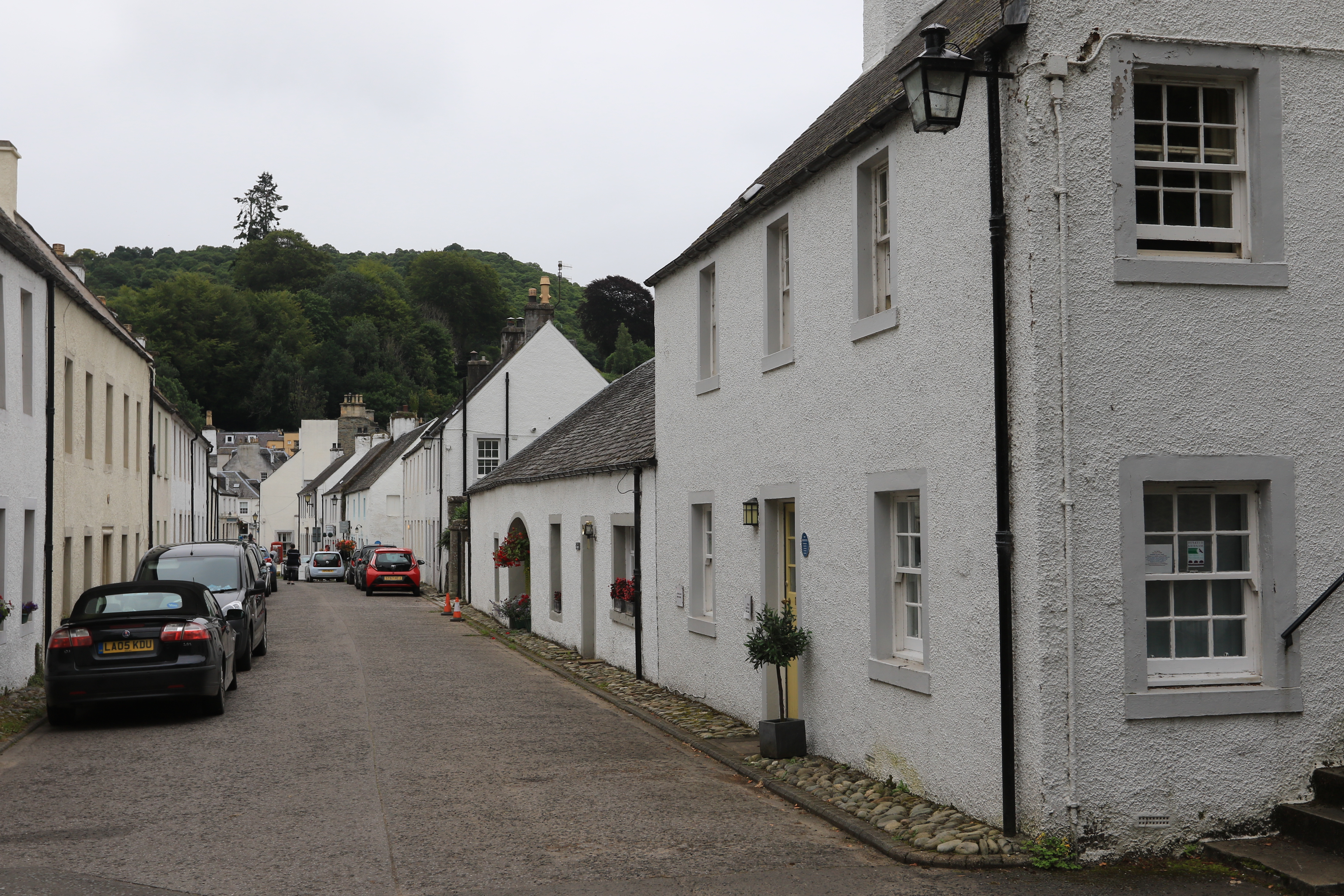
- The building in 2020
- Interactive map of the 18–20 Cathedral Street area

General information
- Location: Cathedral Street; Dunkeld, Scotland
- Coordinates: 56°33′54″N 3°35′19″W
- Completed: c. 1715 (311 years ago)

Technical details
- Floor count: 2

Other information
- Public transit: Dunkeld and Birnam

Listed Building – Category B
- Official name: 18, 20 Cathedral Street
- Designated: 5 October 1971
- Reference no.: LB5645

18–20 Cathedral Street is an historic building in Dunkeld, Perth and Kinross, Scotland. Standing adjacent to the gates to Dunkeld Cathedral at the western end of Cathedral Street, it is a Category B listed building dating to c. 1715. It is two storeys, with a three-window frontage.

== See also ==
- List of listed buildings in Dunkeld And Dowally, Perth and Kinross
