= 21–23 Cathedral Street, Dunkeld =

Building in Dunkeld, Scotland

21–23 Cathedral Street
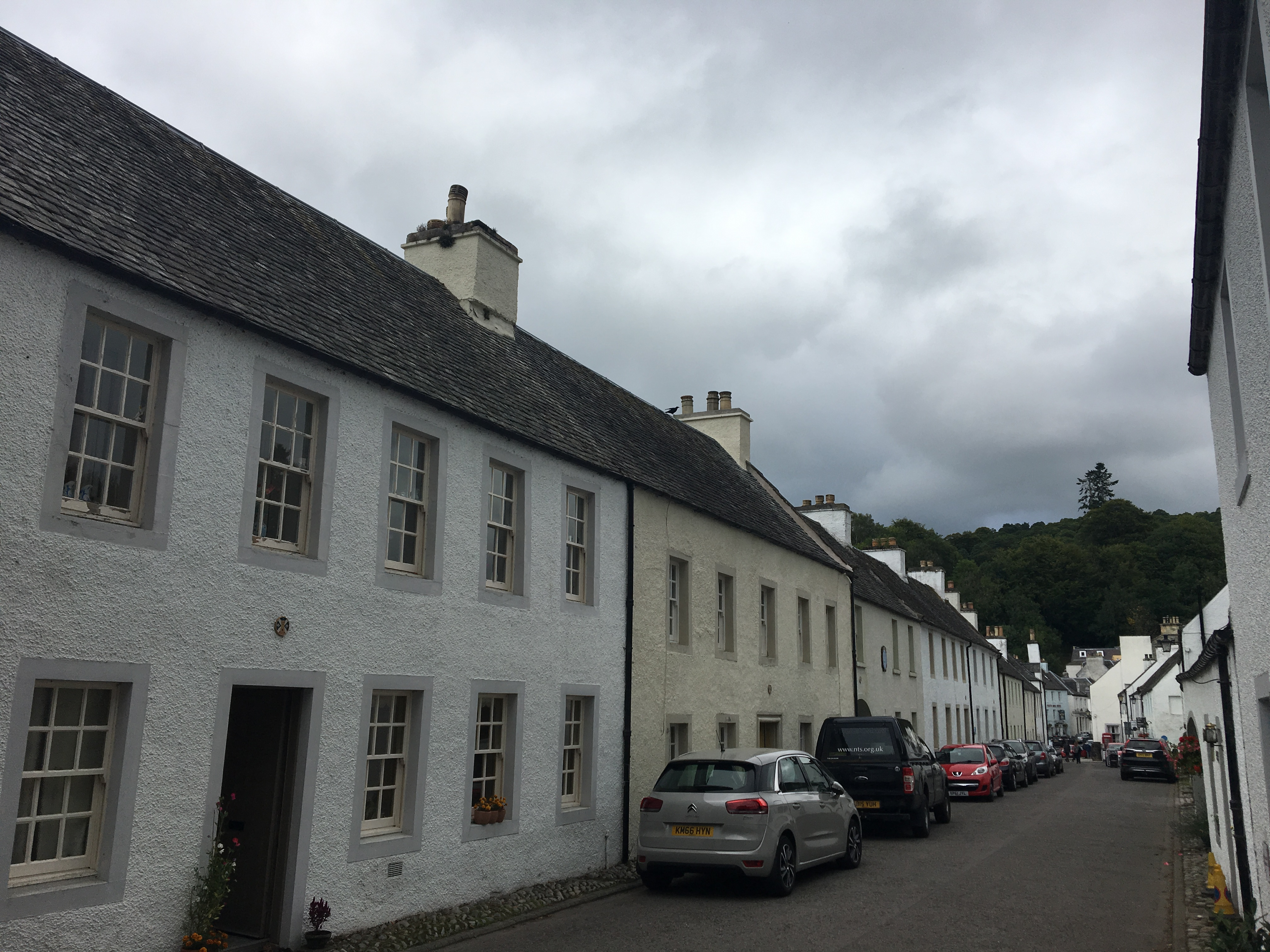
- The building is the closest to the camera in this 2018 easterly view
- Interactive map of the 21–23 Cathedral Street area

General information
- Location: Cathedral Street; Dunkeld, Scotland
- Coordinates: 56°33′55″N 3°35′19″W
- Completed: c. 1715 (311 years ago)

Technical details
- Floor count: 2

Other information
- Public transit: Dunkeld and Birnam

Listed Building – Category B
- Official name: 21, 23 Cathedral Street (N.)
- Designated: 5 October 1971
- Reference no.: LB5639

21–23 Cathedral Street is an historic building in Dunkeld, Perth and Kinross, Scotland. Standing near the gates to Dunkeld Cathedral at the western end of Cathedral Street, it is a Category B listed building dating to c. 1715. It is two storeys, with a five-window frontage with an L-plan block.

== See also ==
- List of listed buildings in Dunkeld And Dowally, Perth and Kinross
