= The Duchess Anne =

Building in Dunkeld, Scotland

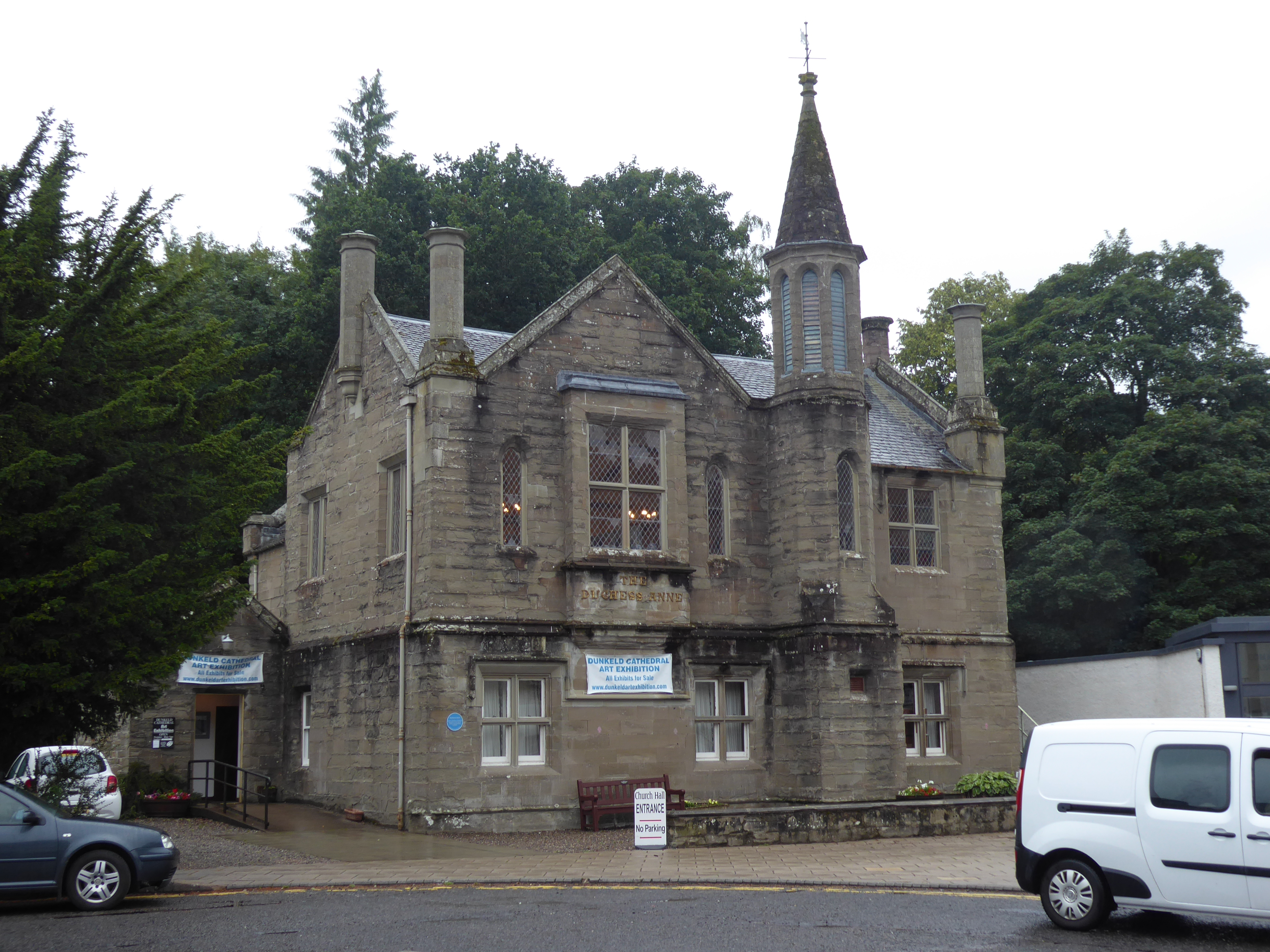
- The building in 2018
- Interactive map of the The Duchess Anne area

General information
- Architectural style: Tudor-gothic
- Location: High Street; Dunkeld, Scotland
- Coordinates: 56°33′56″N 3°35′14″W
- Completed: 1853; 173 years ago

Technical details
- Floor count: 2

Other information
- Public transit: Dunkeld and Birnam

Listed Building – Category B
- Official name: DUCHESS ANNE RESTAURANT (FORMER DUCHESS OF ATHOLL GIRL'S INDUSTRIAL SCHOOL) CROSS, DUNKELD
- Designated: 5 October 1971
- Reference no.: LB5617

The Duchess Anne (formerly Duchess of Atholl Girl's Industrial School and Duchess Anne Restaurant) is an historic building in Dunkeld, Perth and Kinross, Scotland. Standing near Dunkeld mercat cross, it is a Category B listed building dating to 1853. It is two storeys, made of ashlar stone, and its architect was R & R Dickson.

== See also ==
- List of listed buildings in Dunkeld And Dowally, Perth and Kinross
