= 19 Cathedral Street, Dunkeld =

Building in Dunkeld, Scotland

19 Cathedral Street
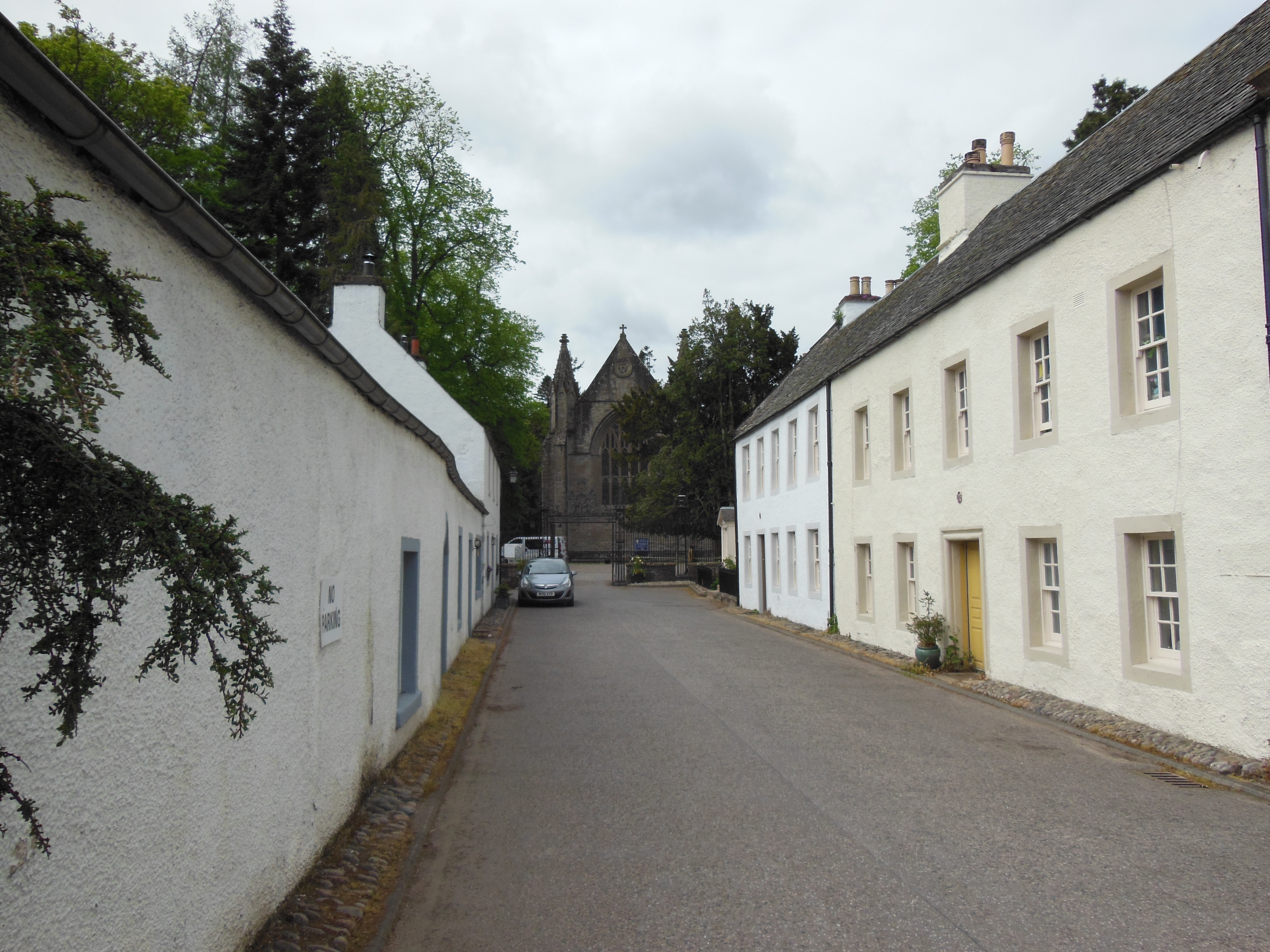
- Number 19 is the building with the yellow door in this 2013 photograph
- Interactive map of the 19 Cathedral Street area

General information
- Location: Cathedral Street; Dunkeld, Scotland
- Coordinates: 56°33′55″N 3°35′18″W
- Completed: c. 1715 (311 years ago)

Technical details
- Floor count: 2

Other information
- Public transit: Dunkeld and Birnam

Listed Building – Category B
- Official name: 19 Cathedral Street (N.)
- Designated: 5 October 1971
- Reference no.: LB5638

19 Cathedral Street is an historic building in Dunkeld, Perth and Kinross, Scotland. Standing near the gates to Dunkeld Cathedral at the western end of Cathedral Street, it is a Category B listed building dating to c. 1715. It is two storeys, with a five-window frontage. It is believed to be a surviving property from a pre-Reformation manse. It was consecrated by the Bishop of Dunkeld in 1516. It was the home of poet and scholar Gavin Douglas (1474–1522).

== See also ==
- List of listed buildings in Dunkeld And Dowally, Perth and Kinross
