= Taybank Hotel =

Hotel in Dunkeld, Scotland

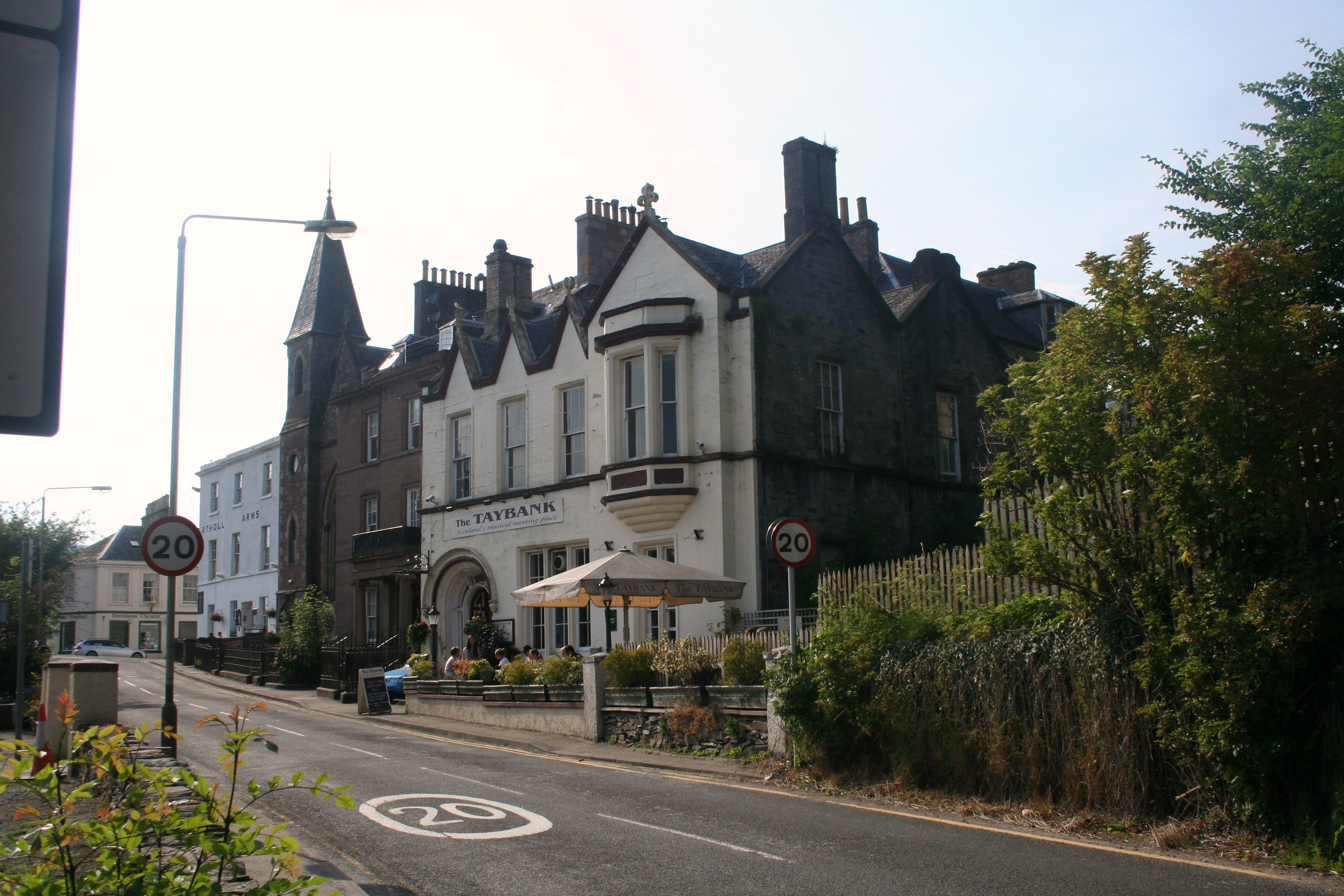
- The building in 2011
- Interactive map of the Taybank Hotel area

General information
- Type: Hotel and restaurant
- Architectural style: Victorian
- Location: Boat Road; Dunkeld, Scotland
- Coordinates: 56°33′58″N 3°35′04″W
- Completed: Early 19th century
- Owner: Fraser Potter

Technical details
- Floor count: 2

Other information
- Public transit: Dunkeld and Birnam

Website
- www.thetaybank.co.uk

Listed Building – Category C(S)
- Official name: TAYBANK HOTEL, BOAT ROAD
- Designated: 5 October 1971
- Reference no.: LB5599

The Taybank Hotel is a hotel and restaurant in Dunkeld, Perth and Kinross, Scotland. It is a Category C listed building dating to the early 19th century.

A gazebo in the hotel's garden is also a Category C listed structure.

The building was formerly owned by singer-songwriter Dougie MacLean.

== See also ==
- List of listed buildings in Dunkeld And Dowally, Perth and Kinross
