= The Ell House =

Hotel in Dunkeld, Scotland

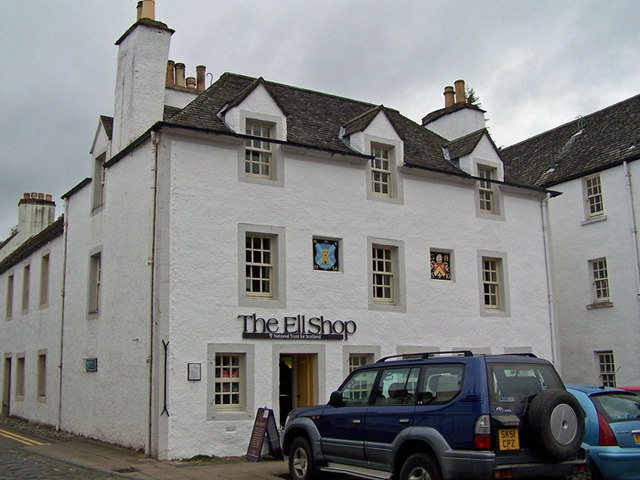
- The building in 2009
- Interactive map of the The Ell House area

General information
- Location: 9 High Street; Dunkeld, Scotland
- Coordinates: 56°33′56″N 3°35′14″W
- Completed: 1757; 269 years ago

Technical details
- Floor count: 3

Other information
- Public transit: Dunkeld and Birnam

Listed Building – Category B
- Official name: 'The Ell House', The Cross, High Street (W.)
- Designated: 5 October 1971
- Reference no.: LB5646

The Ell House (now The Ell Shop) is an historic building in Dunkeld, Perth and Kinross, Scotland. Standing at the corner of High Street and Cathedral Street, near Dunkeld Market Cross, it is a Category B listed building dating to 1757. It was, along with 1 Cathedral Street at its rear, formerly St George's Hospital. The building is so named because it has a weaver's measure (or ell) attached to its exterior.

== Plaque ==
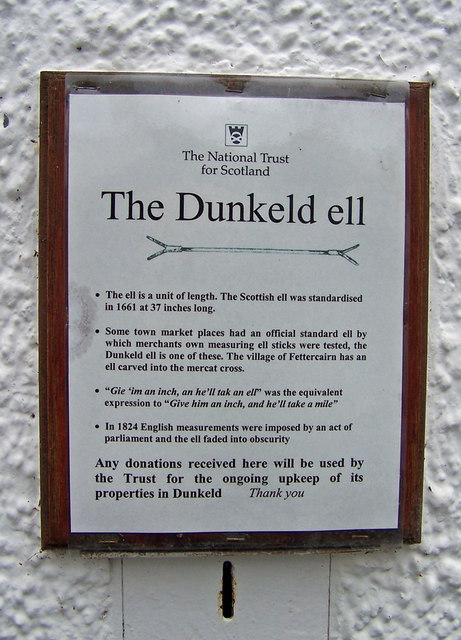
Information plaque about the Dunkeld ell from the National Trust for Scotland

== See also ==
- List of listed buildings in Dunkeld And Dowally, Perth and Kinross
