= Perth Arms Hotel =

Hotel in Dunkeld, Scotland

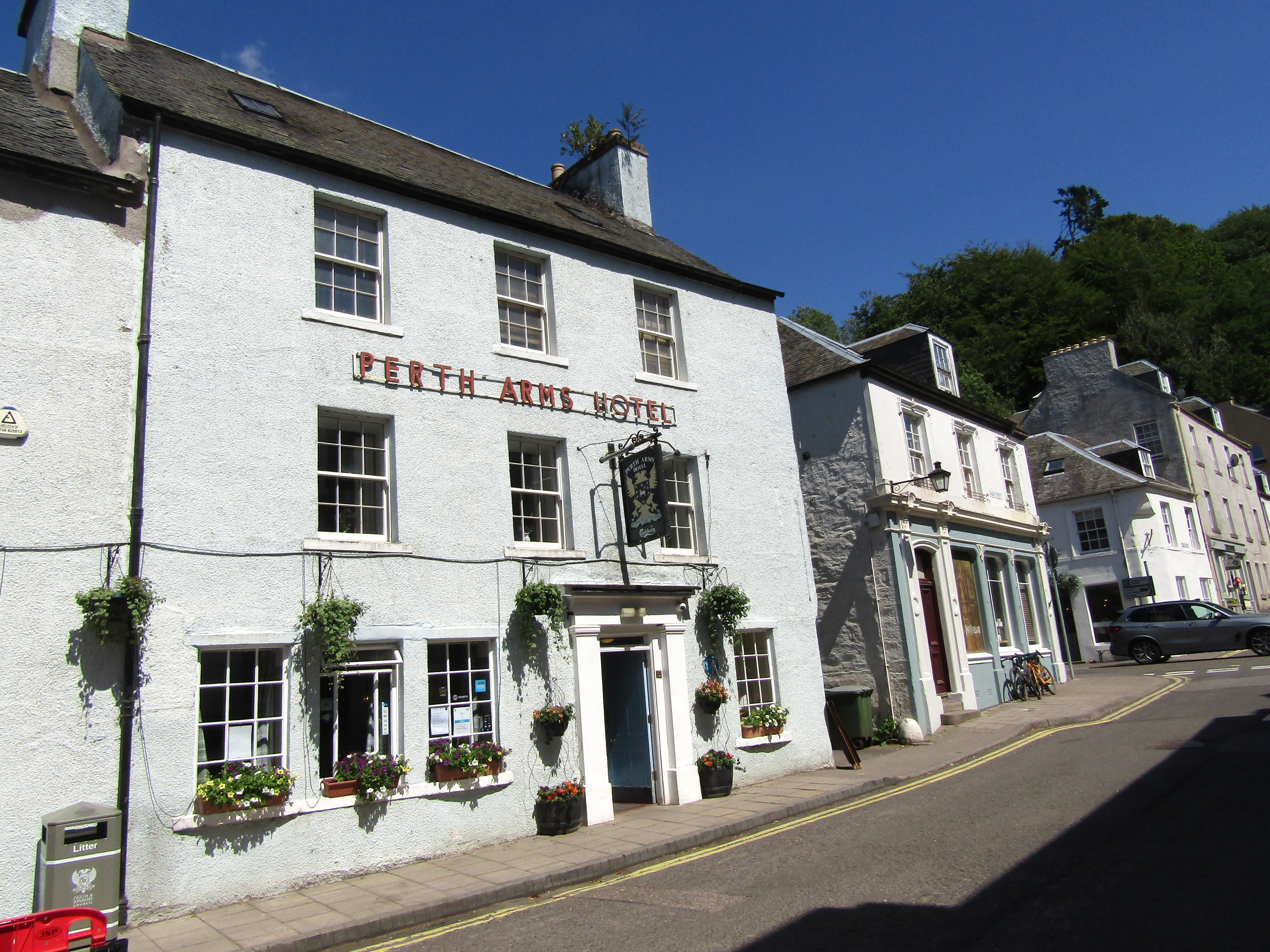
- The building in 2025. The eastern section is slightly taller than the adjoining western section
- Interactive map of the Perth Arms Hotel area

General information
- Type: Hotel and restaurant
- Location: High Street; Dunkeld, Scotland
- Coordinates: 56°33′57″N 3°35′10″W
- Completed: c. 1755 (271 years ago)

Technical details
- Floor count: 3

Other information
- Public transit: Dunkeld and Birnam

Listed Building – Category B
- Official name: Perth Arms Hotel, High Street (N.), West Section
- Designated: 5 October 1971
- Reference no.: LB5613

The Perth Arms Hotel is a hotel and restaurant in Dunkeld, Perth and Kinross, Scotland. It is a Category B listed building dating to around 1755.

== See also ==
- List of listed buildings in Dunkeld And Dowally, Perth and Kinross
