= Dunkeld mercat cross =

- Atholl Memorial Fountain
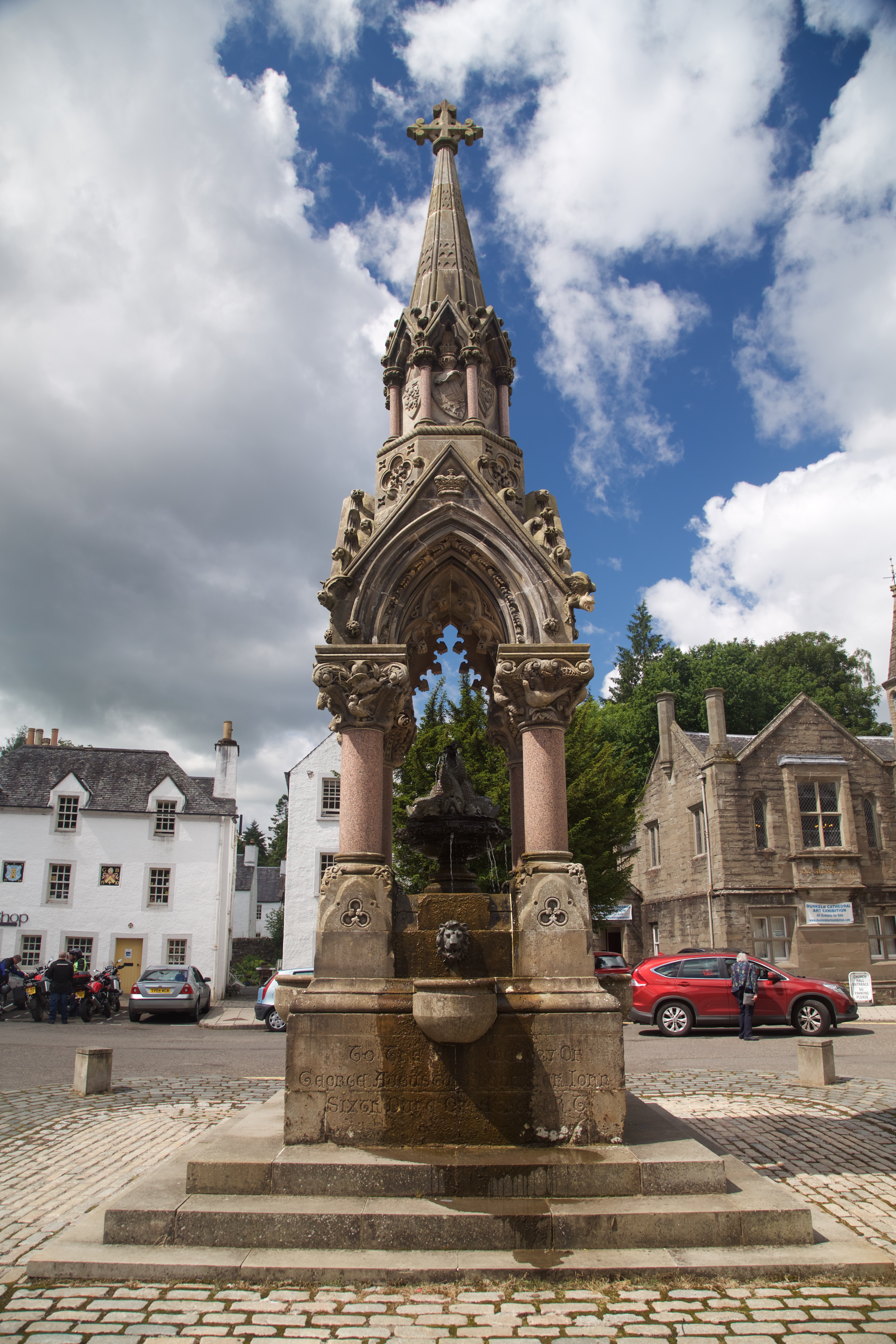
- The fountain in 2016, looking west. The Ell House is on the left; The Duchess Anne on the right

- Location within Perth and Kinross
- 56.565591°N 3.586843°W
- Location: Dunkeld, Perth and Kinross, Scotland

History
- Built: 1866 (160 years ago)

Site notes
- Architect: Charles Sandeman Robertson

Dunkeld market cross (colloquially Dunkeld mercat cross, also known as the Atholl Memorial Fountain), in the Scottish town of Dunkeld, Perth and Kinross, is in the form of a drinking fountain. A Category B listed structure in the care of the National Trust for Scotland, it was designed by Charles Sandeman Robertson and erected in 1866 as a monument to the George Murray, 6th Duke of Atholl. It replaced a cross that was about 20 feet (6.1 m) high, with four iron jougs attached to it.

The fountain stands in a triangular plot between The Cross (to the north and west) and High Street (to the south and east).

== Buildings ==
Buildings in The Cross and High Street triangle include:

- The Duchess Anne
- The Ell Shop
- Perth Arms Hotel

== Gallery ==
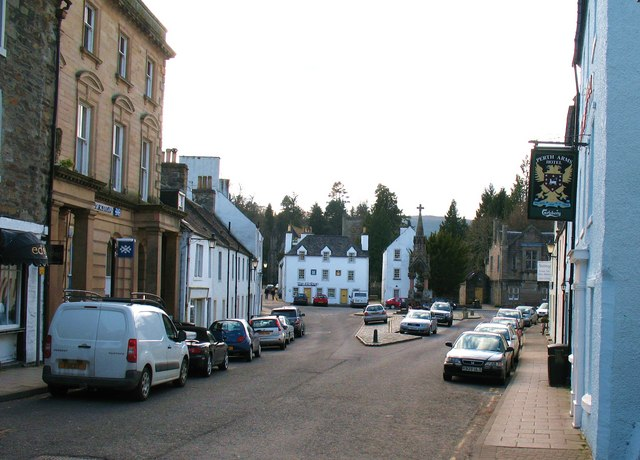
The Cross (the monument and the road to the right), with High Street on the left. In the background are The Ell House and The Duchess Anne

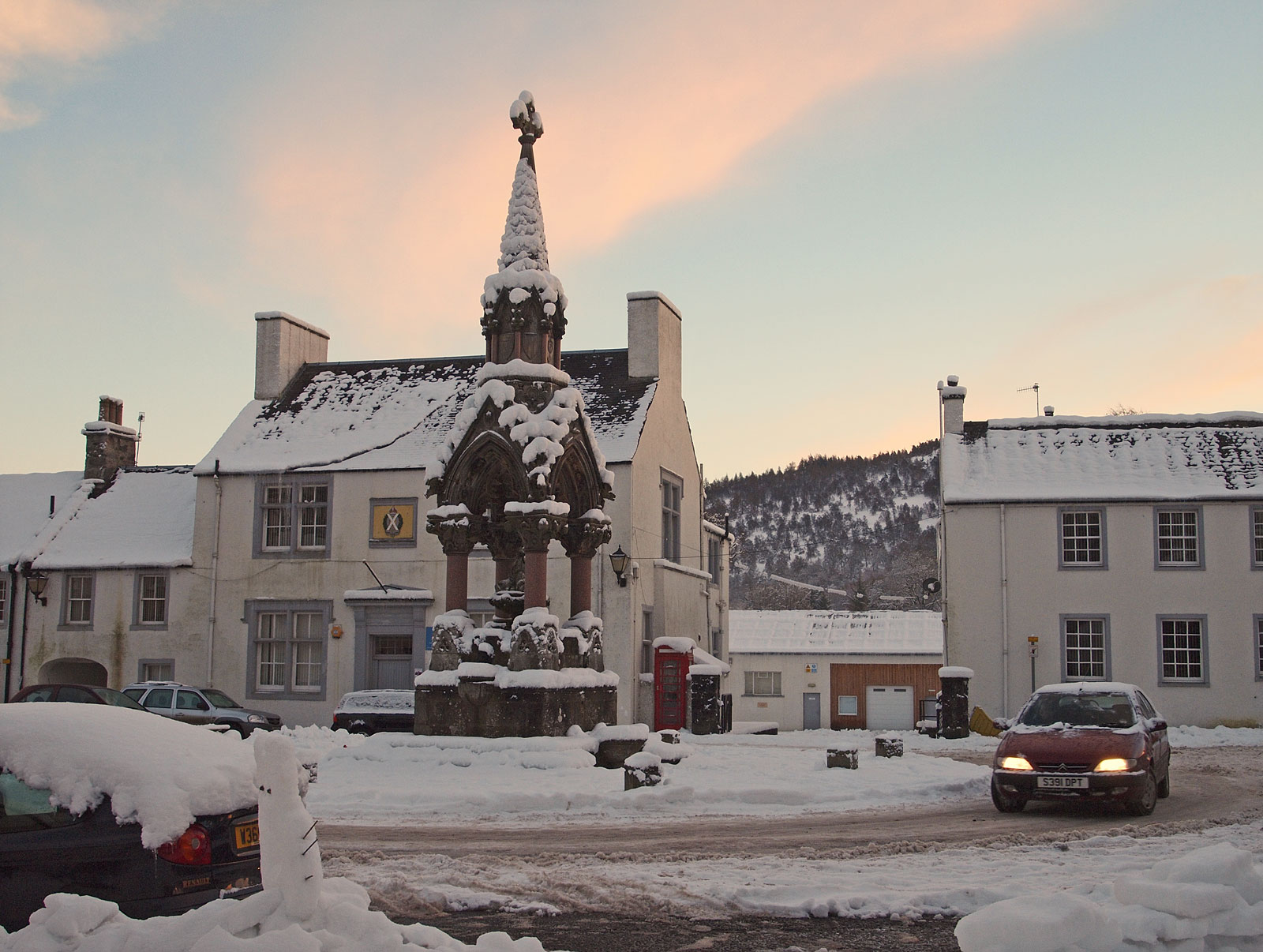
The Cross, looking south, with the Dunkeld Detachment of the Black Watch drill hall behind it

== See also ==
- List of listed buildings in Dunkeld And Dowally, Perth and Kinross
