= George Smyttan =

Scottish physician

Dr George Smyttan FRSE (1789–1863) was a 19th-century Scottish physician who helped to run the Medical Missionary Society in India.

== Life ==
He was born in Dunkeld on 17 June 1789. He was educated at Dunkeld Grammar School.

He studied medicine at St Andrews and Edinburgh but received his doctorate (MD) from Aberdeen University. He was licensed as a surgeon by the Royal College of Surgeons of Edinburgh. In 1808 (aged 19) he began work as a Surgeon for the East India Company based in Bombay in India rising to be Head of the Medical Board for the Bombay district. He returned to Scotland in 1839 and was elected a Fellow of the Royal Society of Edinburgh in 1841. His proposer was Robert Christison. In 1844 he was elected a member of the Harveian Society of Edinburgh.

In Edinburgh he lived and practised from 20 Melville Street in the West End of the city.

He appears to also have had property in Ross & Cromarty and was an elder of the Free Church of Scotland in Tain. He also retained property at Birnam near Dunkeld.

He had a seizure in September 1854 which left him paralysed. He died at Canaan Park (a villa he purchased in 1860) in south Edinburgh on Christmas Day 25 December 1863.

== Family ==
His wife (a Miss Hunt) is later referred to simply as Mrs Smyttan.

His sister Jane Smyttan married Dandeson Coates Bell

His son, Rev George Hunt Smyttan (1824-1870), married Frances Hardy Grey. He was the joint author with Francis Pott of the Lent hymn "Forty days and forty nights".
