= Dunkeld Bridge =

Bridge at Dunkeld, Perth and Kinross, Scotland

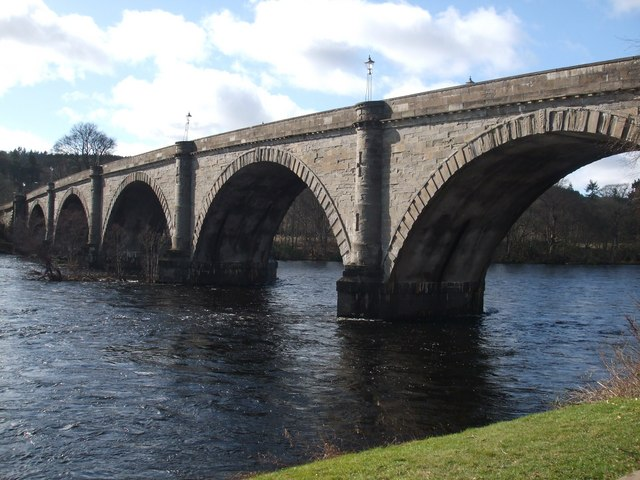
- The River Tay flowing beneath the bridge, looking south
- Coordinates: 56.5639°N 3.5853°W
- Carries: A923
- Crosses: River Tay
- Locale: Perth and Kinross

Characteristics
- Total length: 685 feet (209 m)
- Width: 26.5 feet (8 m)
- Height: 54 feet (16 m)

History
- Opened: 1809; 217 years ago

Listed Building – Category A
- Official name: Dunkeld Bridge Over River Tay
- Designated: 4 October 1971
- Reference no.: LB5620

Location
- Interactive map of Dunkeld Bridge

Dunkeld Bridge is a seven-arch bridge crossing the River Tay at Dunkeld, Perth and Kinross, Scotland. It carries the pedestrian and vehicle traffic of Bridge Street (the A923) and connects the parishes of Dunkeld and Dowally to the north and Little Dunkeld to the south. A Category A listed structure, it is 685 feet (209 m) long, 26.5 feet (8 m) wide and 54 feet (16 m) high. Its middle arch is 90 feet (27 m) wide, two others are 84 feet (26 m), two more are 74 feet (23 m) and the land-arches are 20 feet (6 m). The pontage was abolished in 1879.

The bridge was built between 1805 and 1809 by Thomas Telford. It cost £33,978.

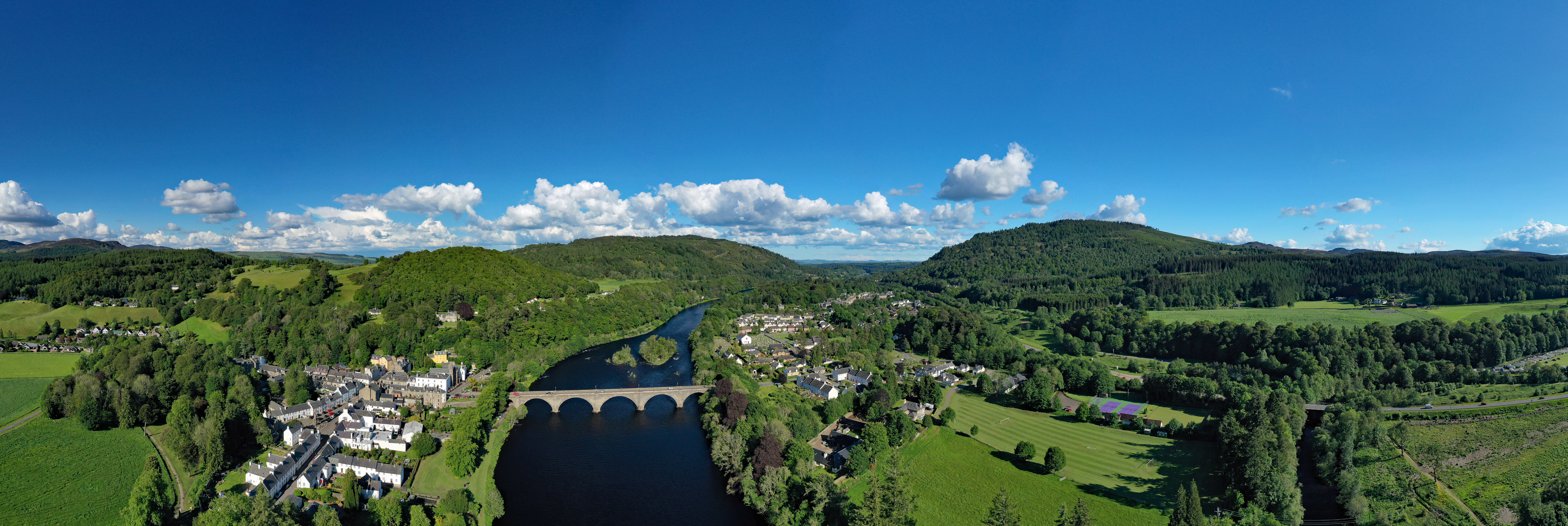
Aerial view of Dunkeld (left), the bridge and Little Dunkeld, looking east towards Meikleour

== Gallery ==
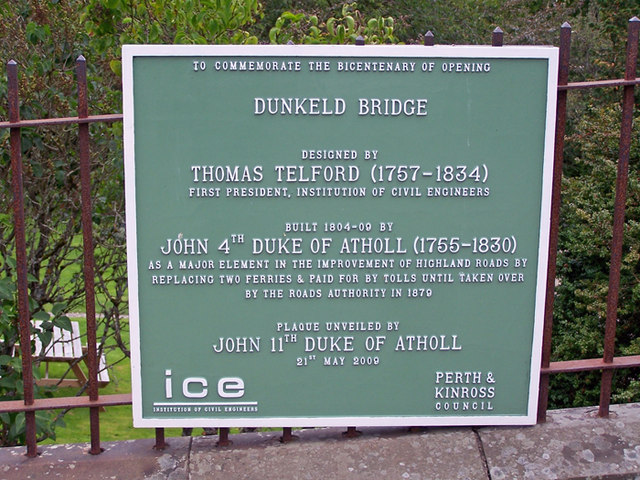
A commemorative plaque on the bridge marking the structure's bicentenary in 2009

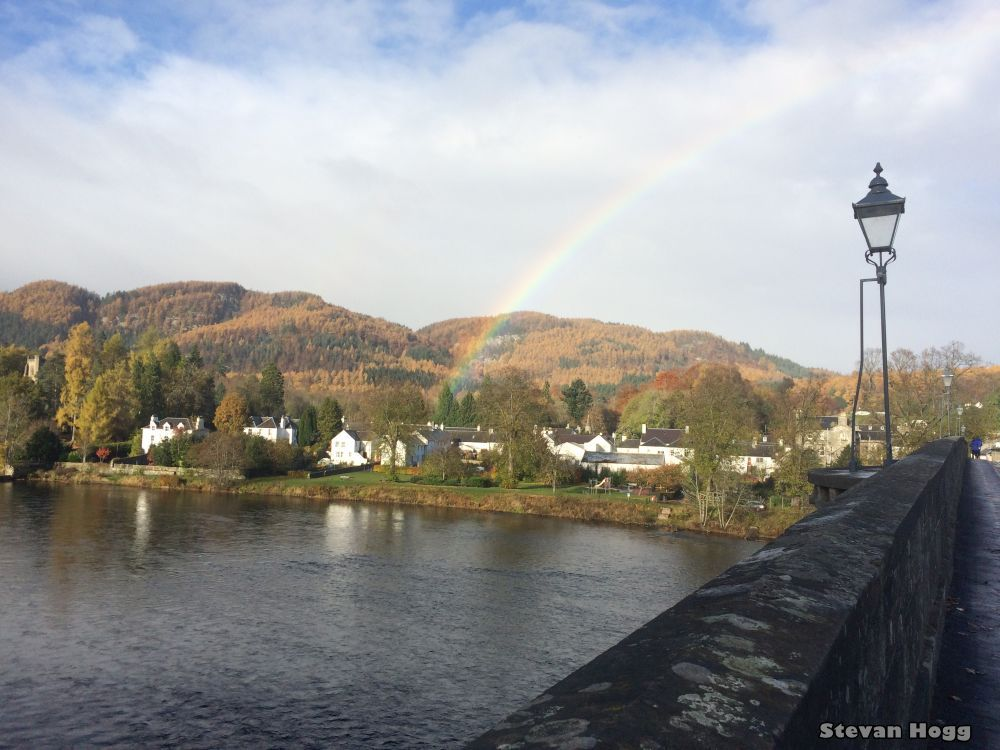
Dunkeld, and a lantern on the bridge

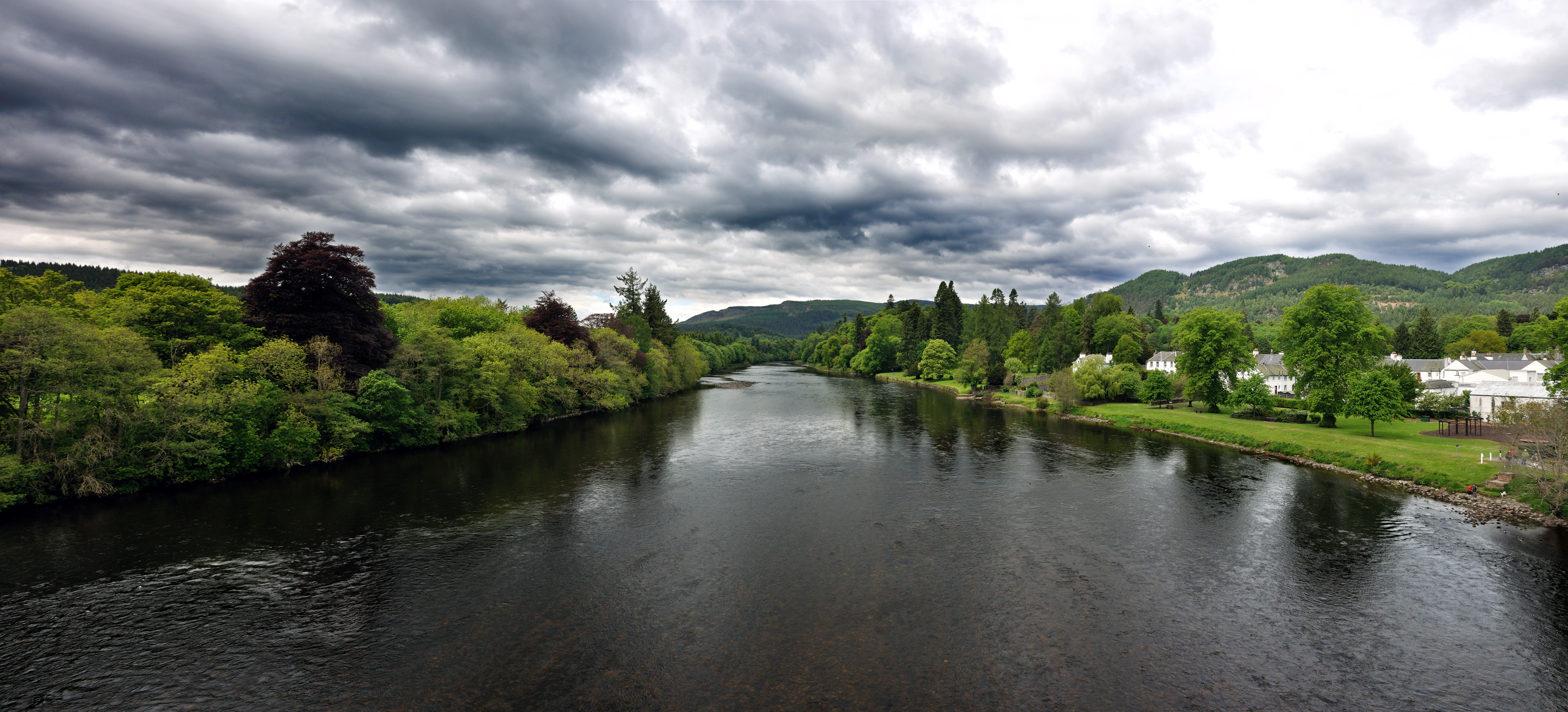
Western view

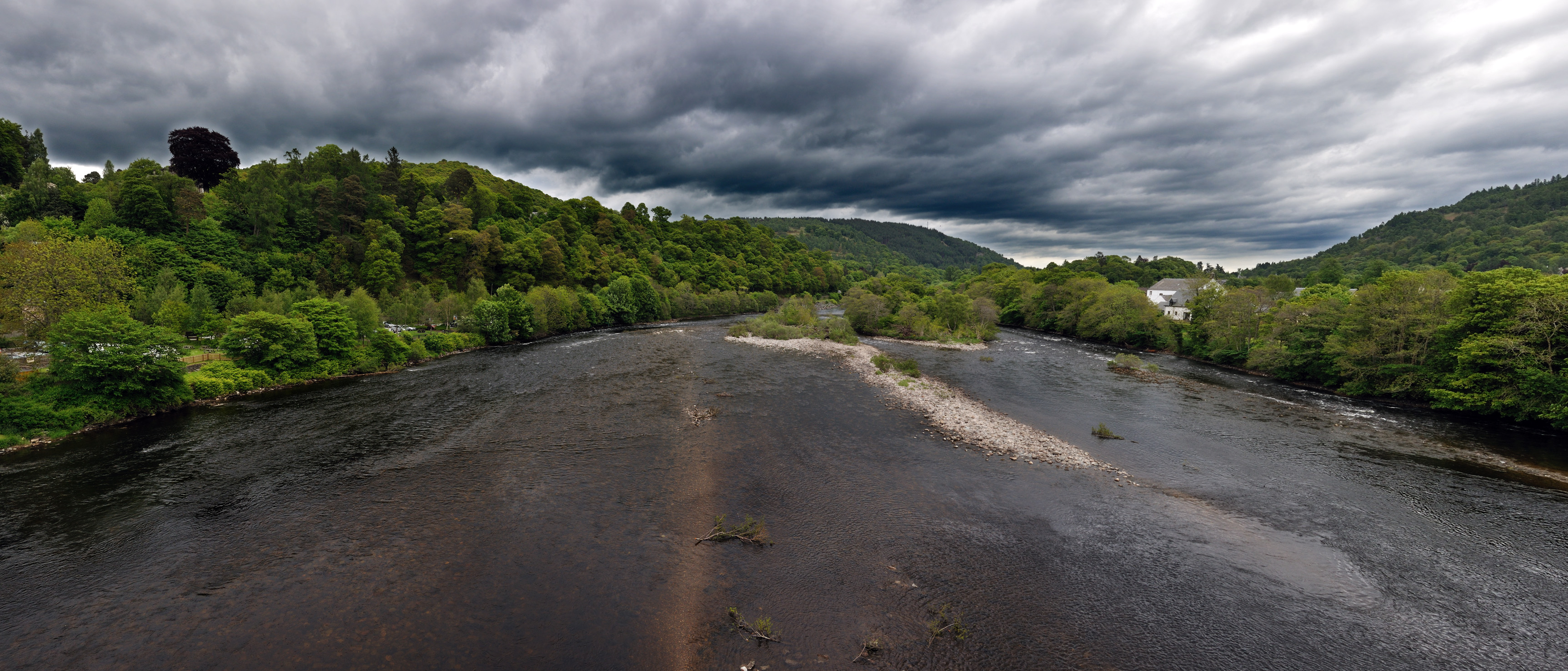
Eastern view

== See also ==
- List of listed buildings in Dunkeld And Dowally, Perth and Kinross
- List of bridges in Scotland
