= Cathedral Street, Dunkeld =

Street in Perth and Kinross, Scotland

Cathedral Street
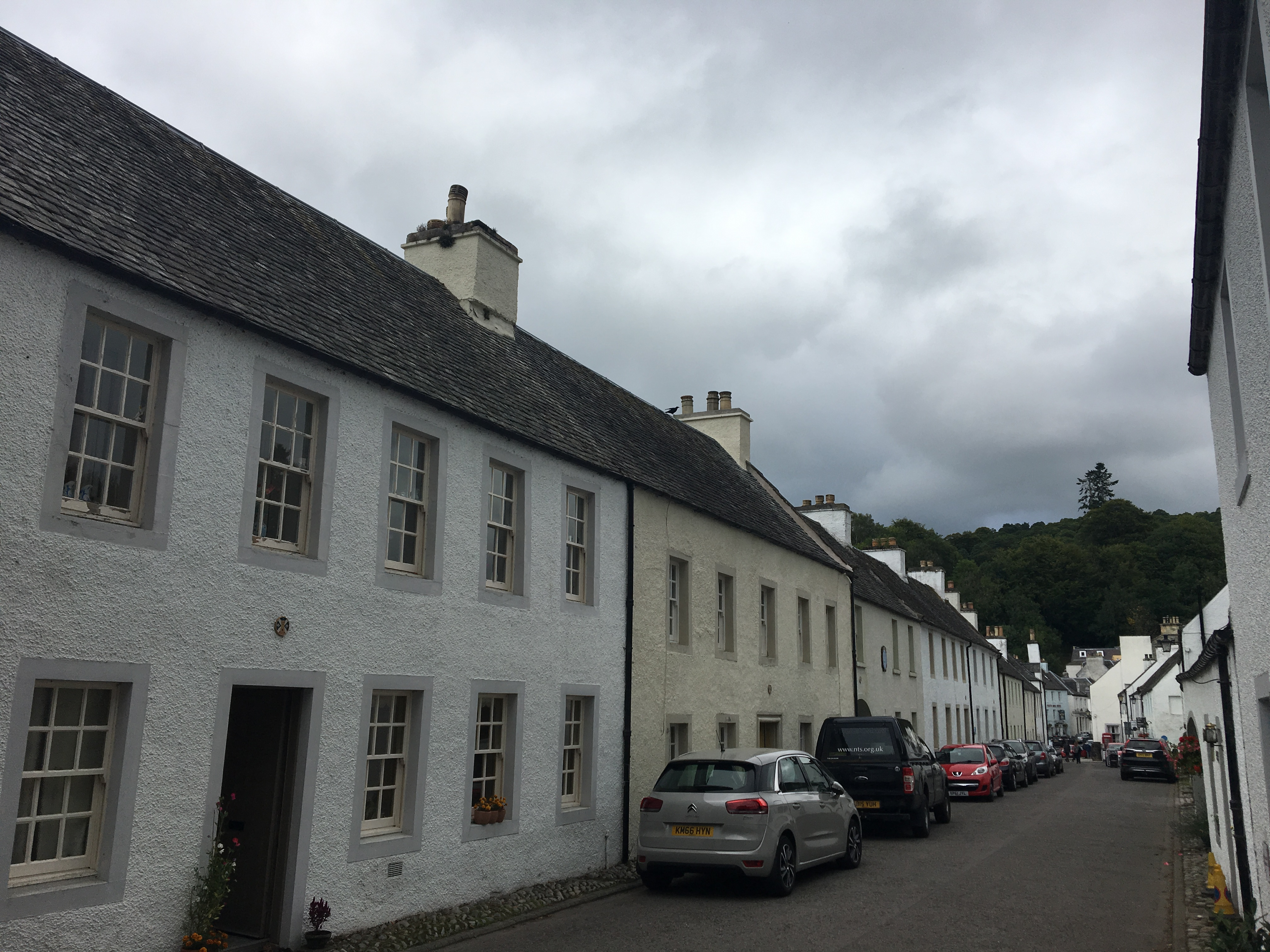
- Looking east to High Street and The Cross
- Interactive map of Cathedral Street
- Namesake: Dunkeld Cathedral
- Location: Dunkeld, Perth and Kinross, Scotland
- East end: The Cross and High Street

Cathedral Street is a historic street in Dunkeld, Perth and Kinross, Scotland. It connects High Street and The Cross, in the east, and Dunkeld Cathedral, in the west. Since 1954, the National Trust for Scotland has restored eleven of its properties dating to the 17th and 18th centuries. Several of the buildings are original, having survived the 1689 Battle of Dunkeld.

According to Parliamentary Papers of 1956, "these houses form a picturesque group on the approach to Dunkeld Cathedral and are of great interest as an example of street architecture of the early 18th century". Grants of £2,500 were made during 1954 and 1955.

Fourteen properties on the street are now Category B listed buildings or structures, including the gates to the cathedral. Number 19 was the home of poet and scholar Gavin Douglas (1474–1522). It was consecrated by the Bishop of Dunkeld in 1516. The house also survived an attack on Dunkeld by the New Model Army in 1654. Number 9, meanwhile, was formerly the home of Alexander Mackenzie (1822–1892), the first Liberal Prime Minister of Canada, who was born in Logierait. Rectory House (also known as Dean's House) was the original manse for the cathedral.

The monks of the Culdee Monastery, which formerly stood on the site of today's cathedral, in various forms, between the 6th and 13th centuries, brought supplies up the street from the adjacent River Tay via the perpendicular Water Wynd that still exists today.

== Listed properties ==
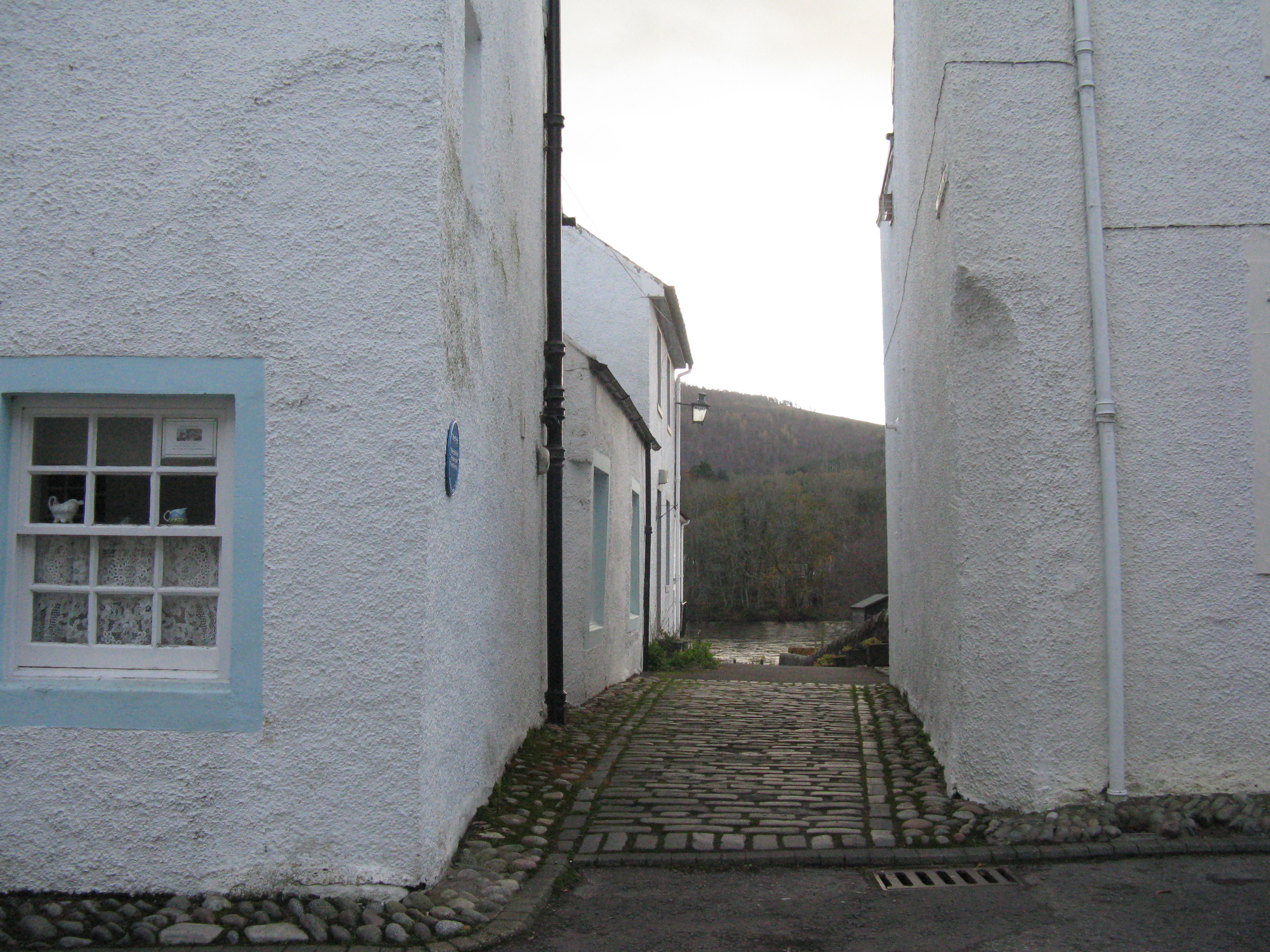
Water Wynd, between numbers 6 and 8, leading down to the River Tay

Northern side (east to west)

- 1 Cathedral Street
- 3 Cathedral Street
- 5–7 Cathedral Street
- 9–11 Cathedral Street
- 13–15 Cathedral Street
- 19 Cathedral Street
- 21–23 Cathedral Street
- Rectory House

Southern side (east to west)

- 2–4 Cathedral Street
- 6 Cathedral Street
- 8–10 Cathedral Street
- Dunkeld Cathedral Manse
- 18–20 Cathedral Street
