= List of listed buildings in Dunkeld And Dowally, Perth and Kinross =

This is a list of listed buildings in the parish of Dunkeld in Perth and Kinross, Scotland.

== List ==
Name	Location	Date listed	Geo-coordinates	Notes	Category	LB number	Image
Brae Street, Hillhead Of Dunkeld, Lodge With Gatepiers, Boundary Walls And Gates			56°33′55″N 3°34′53″W		C(S)	43482	Upload Photo
Manse, Cathedral Street			56°33′54″N 3°35′18″W		B	5644	Upload Photo
W.D. Mckenzie (Dunkeld P.O.) Jen Reid (Hairdressing Salon) And Others. Atholl St. (W.)			56°33′58″N 3°35′09″W		B	5591	Upload Photo
Tay House (Dr. T Hepburn), Boat Road			56°33′55″N 3°35′05″W		C(S)	5598	Upload another image
Taybank Hotel, Gazebo			56°33′55″N 3°35′04″W		C(S)	5600	Upload Photo
Dunkeld House (Now Hotel)			56°33′54″N 3°36′41″W		C(S)	5601	Upload another image See more images
Old Bakehouse, St Ninian's Wynd			56°33′59″N 3°35′12″W		B	5602	Upload Photo
Dunkeld House, Gazebo To N. Of Terraced Garden. ('The Fort')			56°33′55″N 3°36′16″W		C(S)	5609	Upload Photo
Perth Arms Hotel, High Street (N.), West Section			56°33′57″N 3°35′10″W		B	5613	Upload another image See more images
Bank Of Scotland, High Street (S.)			56°33′56″N 3°35′09″W		C(S)	5616	Upload Photo
Monument To 6th Duke Of Atholl, The Cross, High Street			56°33′56″N 3°35′13″W		B	5619	Upload another image See more images
F. Parnell, Brae St. (S.)			56°33′56″N 3°35′05″W		C(S)	5628	Upload Photo
21, 23 Cathedral Street (N.)			56°33′55″N 3°35′19″W		B	5639	Upload another image
11 The Cross, High Street (N.)			56°33′57″N 3°35′13″W		B	5648	Upload Photo
Gallowhill Lodge To Dunkeld House			56°34′15″N 3°35′35″W		B	5571	Upload Photo
Haughend, Farmhouse			56°33′51″N 3°34′05″W		B	5580	Upload Photo
Dunkeld Bridge Over River Tay			56°33′50″N 3°35′07″W		A	5620	Upload another image See more images
Dr. N. Morrison, Bridge Street (W.)			56°33′56″N 3°35′08″W		B	5623	Upload Photo
Atholl Arms Hotel, Bridge St., And Boat Road			56°33′55″N 3°35′07″W		B	5624	Upload another image See more images
18, 20 Cathedral Street			56°33′55″N 3°35′19″W		B	5645	Upload Photo
'The Ell House', The Cross, High Street (W.)			56°33′56″N 3°35′14″W		B	5646	Upload another image See more images
'Connacher' The Cross, High Street (W.)			56°33′56″N 3°35′14″W		B	5647	Upload Photo
Dunkeld House, West Grotto			56°33′56″N 3°36′57″W		B	5573	Upload another image See more images
Ledpettie, Bridge On Disused Section Of Drive To Dunkeld House			56°35′31″N 3°37′14″W		B	5574	Upload Photo
Dowally Church			56°36′48″N 3°37′43″W		B	5576	Upload Photo
Robert Menzies, Atholl St. (W.)			56°33′57″N 3°35′08″W		C(S)	5592	Upload Photo
The Smithy St Ninian's Wynd			56°33′59″N 3°35′10″W		B	5603	Upload Photo
Dunkeld House, Terraced Garden			56°33′53″N 3°36′17″W		C(S)	5608	Upload Photo
Dunkeld Cathedral Property, Brae Street (S)			56°33′56″N 3°35′06″W		C(S)	5626	Upload Photo
J.B. Robertson, Brae St. (S.)			56°33′56″N 3°35′05″W		C(S)	5627	Upload Photo
1 Cathedral Street (North Side)			56°33′56″N 3°35′14″W		B	5633	Upload Photo
3 Cathedral Street (N.)			56°33′56″N 3°35′15″W		B	5634	Upload Photo
9, 11 Cathedral Street (N.)			56°33′56″N 3°35′17″W		B	5636	Upload another image
13, 15 Cathedral Street (N.)			56°33′56″N 3°35′17″W		B	5637	Upload Photo
(Dunkeld Restaurant) And Others Atholl Street (W.)			56°33′57″N 3°35′09″W		B	5590	Upload Photo
Masonic Temple, United Lodge Of Dunkeld No. 14-152 (Former Free Church), Boat Road			56°33′55″N 3°35′06″W		C(S)	5597	Upload Photo
17, 19 High Street (S.)			56°33′56″N 3°35′11″W		B	83	Upload Photo
Guay			56°37′24″N 3°38′04″W		B	5579	Upload Photo
Deancross Old Tollhouse			56°33′15″N 3°33′31″W		B	5584	Upload Photo
Springwells, Brae St. (N.)			56°33′57″N 3°35′06″W		C(S)	5585	Upload Photo
T.I. Stanton To Scottish Gas Board, Atholl Street, (E.)			56°33′58″N 3°35′07″W		C(S)	5587	Upload Photo
Dunkeld House Gardens (Mr Fleming)			56°34′11″N 3°35′29″W		B	5606	Upload Photo
O.S. Mcwilliam & R.A. Gray, Bridge Street (W.)			56°33′54″N 3°35′08″W		C(S)	5621	Upload Photo
Sundial House, Burgess Brae, Off Brae Street			56°33′55″N 3°35′03″W		B	5630	Upload another image See more images
Dunkeld Cathedral Gates			56°33′55″N 3°35′20″W		B	5632	Upload another image
5, 7 Cathedral Street (N.)			56°33′56″N 3°35′16″W		B	5635	Upload Photo
19 Cathedral Street (N.)			56°33′55″N 3°35′18″W		B	5638	Upload Photo
8, 10 Cathedral Street			56°33′55″N 3°35′16″W		B	5643	Upload Photo
Lady Charlotte's Cave, Craig-Y-Barns (Marked As Duchess's On O.S. Maps)			56°34′35″N 3°35′56″W		B	5572	Upload Photo
Haughend, Steading			56°33′50″N 3°34′04″W		C(S)	5581	Upload Photo
Eastwood House			56°33′40″N 3°34′18″W		B	5583	Upload Photo
R. Menzies, Atholl St. (W.)			56°33′57″N 3°35′08″W		C(S)	5589	Upload Photo
Dunkeld House, East Grotto (The Mousetrap)			56°33′49″N 3°35′44″W		B	5607	Upload another image See more images
12, 12A The Cross, High St. (N.)			56°33′57″N 3°35′12″W		B	5610	Upload Photo
14 High Street (N.) (National Trust Property,			56°33′57″N 3°35′11″W		B	5611	Upload Photo
2 Properties, Burns, Booksellers And City Of Perth Co-Op Soc., Ltd., Bridge Street (W.)			56°33′55″N 3°35′08″W		C(S)	5622	Upload Photo
Brae Street, Hillhead Of Dunkeld, Stable Cottages With Stables, Gatepiers, Gates And Boundary Walls			56°33′56″N 3°34′50″W		C(S)	43483	Upload Photo
Dean's House (Now Rectory House), Cathedral Street (N.)			56°33′55″N 3°35′19″W		B	5640	Upload another image
Dowally Village, Smith			56°36′47″N 3°37′43″W		C(S)	5577	Upload Photo
Dowally Village, Calvor & Bisset			56°36′46″N 3°37′43″W		C(S)	5578	Upload Photo
Cardney House			56°35′22″N 3°32′52″W		B	5582	Upload Photo
Bruce & Macdonald's Property Atholl Street (W.)			56°33′59″N 3°35′09″W		C(S)	5593	Upload Photo
Former Atholl Inn, And Congregational Church Now Incorporated In Dunkeld Garage, Atholl Street W			56°34′01″N 3°35′09″W		B	5595	Upload Photo
Craigview, Dunkeld			56°34′04″N 3°35′08″W		B	5604	Upload Photo
Brae Street, Hillhead Of Dunkeld, Beechwood House With Terrace Wall And Steps			56°33′56″N 3°34′58″W		B	5605	Upload Photo
15 High Street (N.)			56°33′57″N 3°35′10″W		B	5612	Upload Photo
Duchess Anne Restaurant (Former Duchess Of Atholl Girl's Industrial School) Cross, Dunkeld			56°33′57″N 3°35′15″W		B	5617	Upload another image
Scottish Horse Museum, Eastern Part With Pend, High Street (S.)			56°33′56″N 3°35′12″W		C(S)	5618	Upload Photo
Old Post Office To Mckellar, Bridge Street And Mrs. I. Mackintosh, Brae Street (S)			56°33′55″N 3°35′07″W		C(S)	5625	Upload Photo
Ellis's Trustees, Brae St. (S)			56°33′56″N 3°35′05″W		C(S)	5629	Upload Photo
Dunkeld Cathedral			56°33′54″N 3°35′24″W		A	5631	Upload another image
2, 4 Cathedral Street			56°33′55″N 3°35′14″W		B	5641	Upload Photo
Evan Haxton's Property 6 Cathedral Street			56°33′55″N 3°35′15″W		B	5642	Upload Photo
Rotmell Farm			56°36′17″N 3°37′21″W		B	5575	Upload Photo
M. & M. Black, Atholl St. (E.)			56°33′58″N 3°35′07″W		B	5588	Upload Photo
Royal Hotel, Atholl St. (W.)			56°34′00″N 3°35′09″W		B	5594	Upload Photo
Dunkeld Lodge, Atholl Street			56°34′05″N 3°35′13″W		B	5596	Upload Photo
Taybank Hotel, Boat Road			56°33′58″N 3°35′04″W		C(S)	5599	Upload another image
Perth Arms Hotel, High Street (N.), East Section			56°33′57″N 3°35′09″W		B	5614	Upload another image See more images
K. Stanley & Sons, High Street (S.)			56°33′56″N 3°35′09″W		B	5615	Upload Photo
Martin And Others (Part Vacant 1963) Brae Street (N)			56°33′57″N 3°35′07″W		C(S)	84	Upload Photo

== Key ==
The scheme for classifying buildings in Scotland is:

- Category A: "buildings of national or international importance, either architectural or historic; or fine, little-altered examples of some particular period, style or building type."
- Category B: "buildings of regional or more than local importance; or major examples of some particular period, style or building type, which may have been altered."
- Category C: "buildings of local importance; lesser examples of any period, style, or building type, as originally constructed or moderately altered; and simple traditional buildings which group well with other listed buildings."

In March 2016 there were 47,288 listed buildings in Scotland. Of these, 8% were Category A, and 50% were Category B, with the remaining 42% being Category C.
