= Dunkeld & Birnam railway station =

Railway station in Perth and Kinross, Scotland

Dunkeld & Birnam Scottish Gaelic: Dùn Chailleann & Braonan
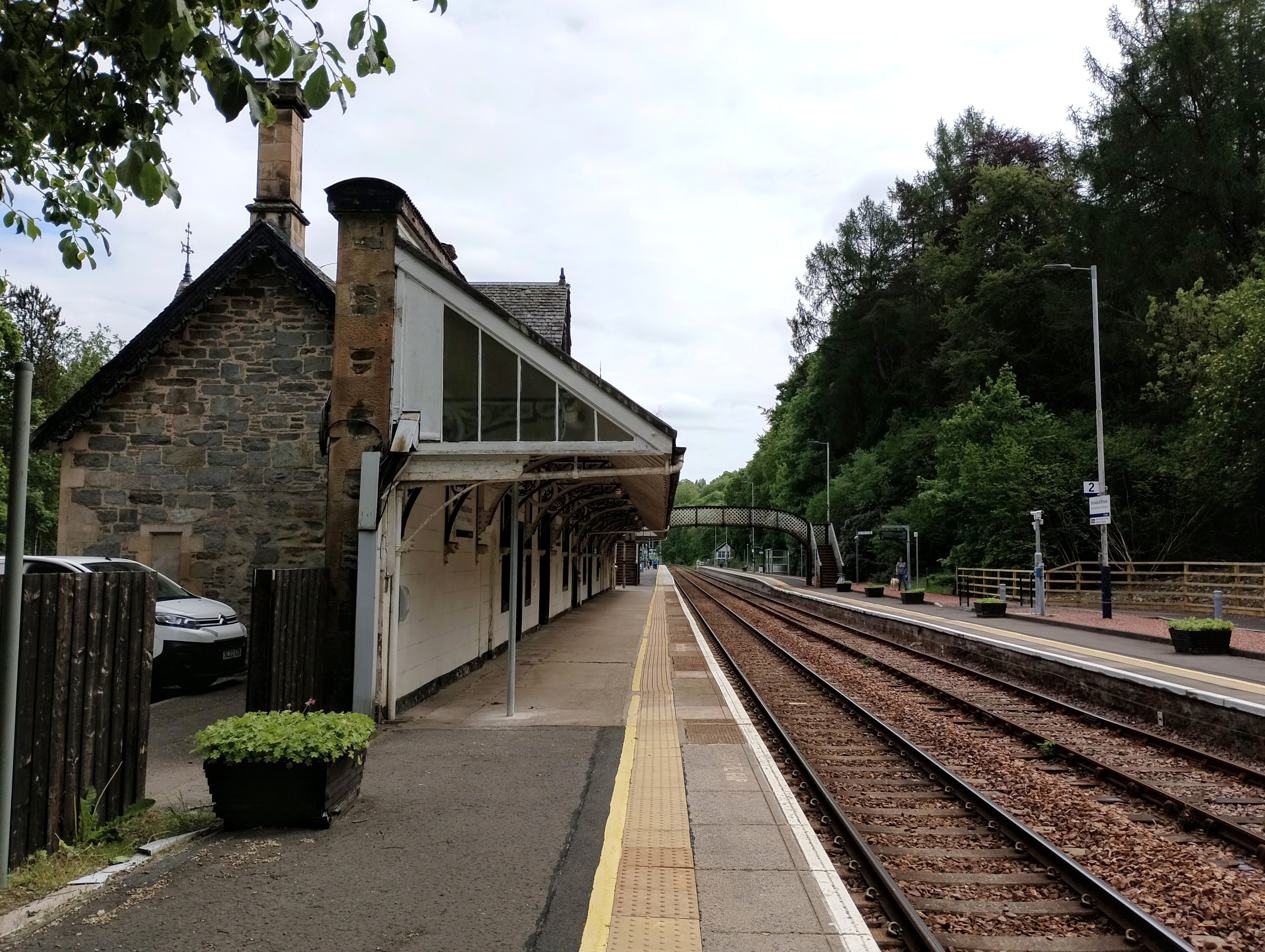
- View south towards Perth

General information
- Location: Dunkeld, Perth and Kinross; Scotland
- Coordinates: 56.5569°N 3.5783°W
- Grid reference: NO030416
- Manager: ScotRail
- Platforms: 2

Other information
- Station code: DKD

Key dates
- 7 April 1856: Opened

Passengers
- 2020/21: ▼7,740
- 2021/22: ▲27,444
- 2022/23: ▲38,416
- 2023/24: ▲51,290
- 2024/25: ▲61,270

Listed Building – Category A
- Designated: 5 October 1971
- Reference no.: LB11139
Location
Notes
- Passenger statistics from the Office of Rail and Road

Dunkeld & Birnam railway station (usually referred to as Dunkeld) serves the town of Dunkeld and village of Birnam in Perth and Kinross, Scotland. It is located on the Highland Main Line, 15 miles 31 chains (24.8 km) north of Perth and is the first stop on the line north of there, before Pitlochry.

== History ==
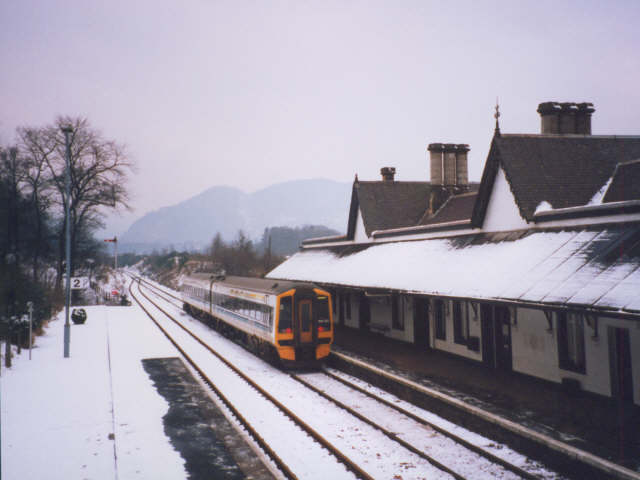
A Regional Railways Class 158 departs from the station in 1994

The station opened on 7 April 1856, as the terminus of the Perth and Dunkeld Railway from Stanley Junction (on the Scottish Midland Junction Railway). Seven years later, it became a through station when the Inverness and Perth Junction Railway opened its line to Inverness via Pitlochry and Forres (the I&PJR had taken over the Perth & Dunkeld company that year - prior to this, the SMJR had worked the line).

The station was host to a LMS caravan in 1935 and 1936 followed by two caravans from 1937 to 1939.

== Facilities ==
The station has a small car park (and some bike racks), which gives step-free access to platform 1, which has a bench and a waiting shelter. There is no step-free access (access is via a footbridge) – nor any facilities – on platform 2. As there are no facilities to purchase tickets, passengers must buy one in advance, or from the guard on the train.

== Platforms ==
The station has a passing loop 28 chains (560 m) long, flanked by two platforms. Platform 1 on the southbound line can accommodate trains having twelve coaches, but platform 2 on the northbound line can only hold ten. When no crossing is to be made, northbound trains are usually routed through platform 1 which is signalled for bi-directional running.

Although the trackbed has been raised following reballasting over the years, the platforms had not had similar treatment until recently, but now both platforms are of standard height, although not for the full length.

== Passenger volume ==
Passenger Volume at Dunkeld & Birnam
	2004–05	2005–06	2006–07	2007–08	2008–09	2009–10	2010–11	2011–12	2012–13	2013–14	2014–15	2015–16	2016–17	2017–18	2018–19	2019–20	2020–21	2021–22	2022–23	2023–24	2024–25
Entries and exits	18,810	19,339	21,897	20,856	23,578	25,436	26,178	26,506	27,862	29,924	31,050	32,022	32,878	37,982	36,930	36,608	7,740	27,444	38,416	51,290	61,270

The statistics cover twelve month periods that start in April.

== Services ==
As of May 2026, there are ten departures northbound to Inverness and southbound to Perth each weekday, with six trains going to Glasgow Queen Street and four to Edinburgh Waverley. On Sundays, there are 4 trains per day to Inverness (one of which extends to Elgin) and, southbound, four trains to Edinburgh Waverley (including the LNER Highland Chieftain service) and two to Glasgow Queen Street. In addition, the Caledonian Sleeper runs to London Euston six nights per week.

Preceding station	National Rail	Following station
Perth	London North Eastern Railway; Sunday, Southbound Only; East Coast Main Line	Pitlochry
Perth	ScotRail; Highland Line	Pitlochry
Perth	Caledonian Sleeper; Highland Caledonian Sleeper	Pitlochry
	Historical railways	
Rohallion; Line open; station closed	Highland Railway; Perth and Dunkeld Railway; Inverness and Perth Junction Railway	Dalguise; Line open; station closed

== See also ==
- Public transport in Perth and Kinross

== Bibliography ==
- Brailsford, Martyn, ed. (December 2017) [1987]. "Gaelic/English Station Index". Railway Track Diagrams 1: Scotland & Isle of Man (6th ed.). Frome: Trackmaps. ISBN 978-0-9549866-9-8.
- Grant, Donald J. (2017). Directory of the Railway Companies of Great Britain (1st ed.). Kibworth Beauchamp, Leicestershire: Troubador Publishing Ltd. ISBN 978-1-78803-768-6.
- McRae, Andrew (1997). British Railway Camping Coach Holidays: The 1930s & British Railways (London Midland Region). Vol. Scenes from the Past: 30 (Part One). Foxline. ISBN 1-870119-48-7.
- Quick, Michael (2022) [2001]. Railway passenger stations in Great Britain: a chronology (PDF). version 5.04. Railway & Canal Historical Society. Archived from the original (PDF) on 25 November 2022.
- Thomas, John; Turnock, David (1989). A Regional History of the Railways of Great Britain. Vol. 15 The North of Scotland (1st ed.). Newton Abbott, Devon: David & Charles. ISBN 0-946537-03-8.
