= Dunkeld =

Town in Perth and Kinross, Scotland

Coordinates: 56°33′56″N 3°35′10″W

Dunkeld: Scottish Gaelic: Dùn Chailleann; Scots: Dunkell
- Town
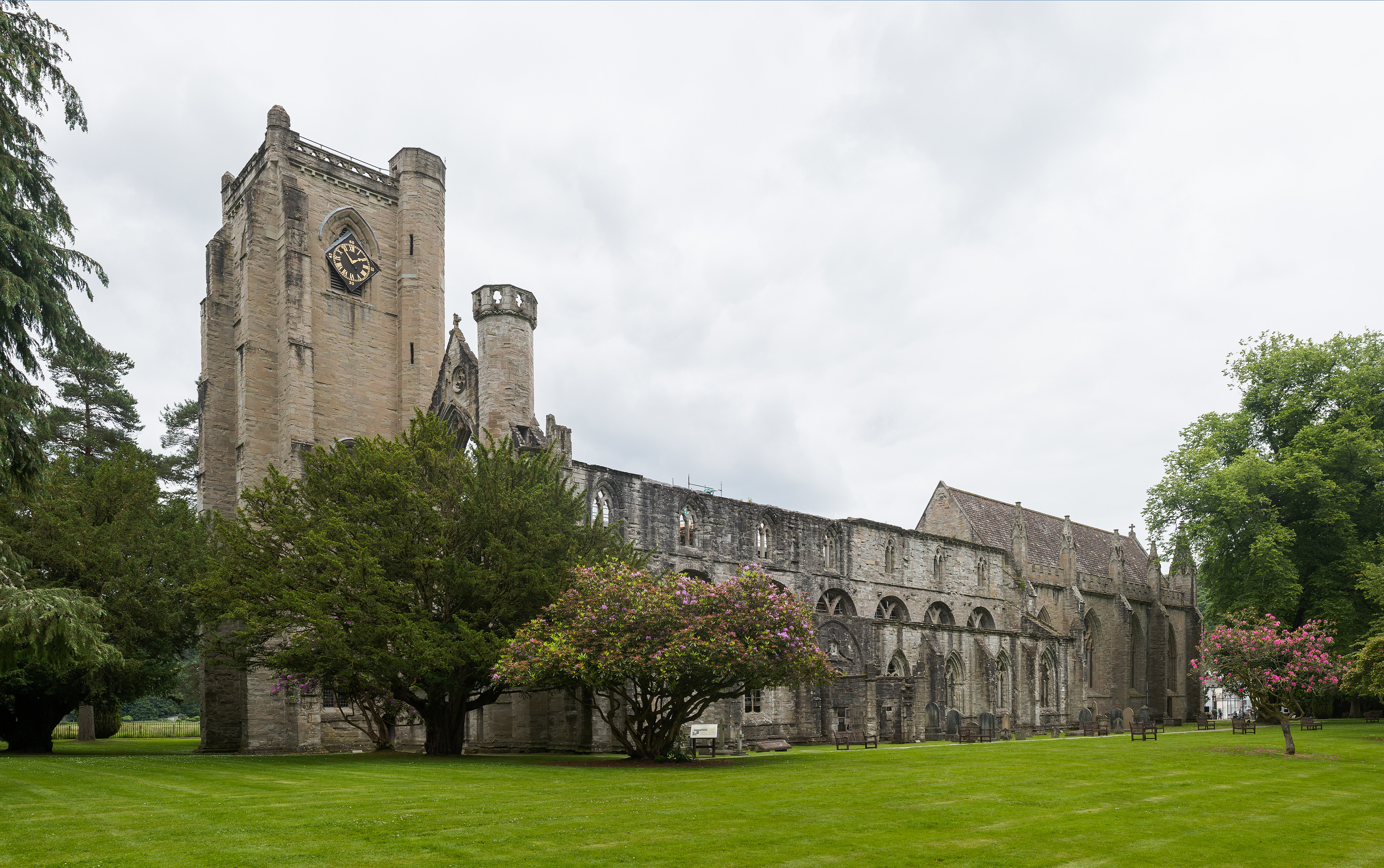
- Dunkeld Cathedral

- Location within Perth and Kinross
- Population: 1,194 (2022)
- OS grid reference: NO027425
  - Edinburgh: 45 mi (72 km)
  - London: 376 mi (605 km)
- Community council: Dunkeld and Birnam
- Council area: Perth and Kinross
- Lieutenancy area: Perth and Kinross
- Country: Scotland
- Sovereign state: United Kingdom
- Post town: DUNKELD
- Postcode district: PH8
- Dialling code: 01350
- Police: Scotland
- Fire: Scottish
- Ambulance: Scottish
- UK Parliament: Angus and Perthshire Glens
- Scottish Parliament: Perthshire North

Dunkeld (/dʌŋˈkɛl/, Scots: Dunkell, from Scottish Gaelic: Dùn Chailleann, "fort of the Caledonians") is a town in Perth and Kinross, Scotland. The location of a historic cathedral, it lies on the north bank of the River Tay, opposite Birnam. Dunkeld lies close to the geological Highland Boundary Fault, and is frequently described as the "Gateway to the Highlands" due to its position on the main road and rail lines north. Dunkeld has a railway station, Dunkeld & Birnam, on the Highland Main Line, and is about 25 kilometres (15 miles) north of Perth on what is now the A9 road. It had a population of 1,194 in 2022.

The main road formerly ran through the town, however following the modernisation of this road it now passes to the west of Dunkeld. It is the location of Dunkeld Cathedral, and is considered to be a remarkably well-preserved example of a Scottish burgh of the late seventeenth and early eighteenth centuries. Around twenty of the houses within Dunkeld have been restored by the National Trust for Scotland. The Hermitage, on the western side of the A9, is a countryside property that is also a National Trust for Scotland site.

Over the centuries there have been several bridges linking Dunkeld with neighbouring Birnam, and the current bridge, designed by Thomas Telford and financed by the 4th Duke of Atholl, was completed in 1809.

== History ==
=== Early history ===
The name Dùn Chailleann means Fort of the Caledonii or of the Caledonians. The 'fort' is presumably the hill fort on King's Seat, slightly north of the town (NO 009 430). Both these place-names imply an early importance for the area of the later town and bishop's seat, stretching back into the Iron Age.

Dunkeld (Duncalden and variants in early documents) is said to have been 'founded' or 'built' by Caustantín son of Fergus, king of the Picts (d. 820). This founding likely referred to one of an ecclesiastical nature on a site already of secular importance, and a Pictish monastery is known to have existed on the site. Kenneth I of Scotland (Cináed mac Ailpín) (843–58) is reputed to have brought relics of St Columba from Iona in 849, in order to preserve them from Viking raids, building a new church to replace the existing structures, which may have been constructed as a simple group of wattle huts. The relics were divided in Kenneth's time between Dunkeld and the Columban monastery at Kells, County Meath, Ireland, to preserve them from Viking raids.

The 'Apostles' Stone', an elaborate but badly worn cross-slab preserved in the cathedral museum, may date to this time. A well-preserved bronze 'Celtic' hand bell, formerly kept in the church of the parish of Little Dunkeld on the south bank of the River Tay opposite Dunkeld, may also survive from the early monastery: a replica is kept in the cathedral museum.

The dedication of the later medieval cathedral was to St Columba. This early church was for a time the chief ecclesiastical site of eastern Scotland (a status yielded in the 10th century to St Andrews). An entry in the Annals of Ulster for 865 refers to the death of Tuathal, son of Artgus, primepscop (Old Irish 'chief bishop') of Fortriu and Abbot of Dunkeld. The monastery was raided in 903 by Danish Vikings sailing up the River Tay, but continued to flourish into the 11th century. At that time, its abbot, Crínán of Dunkeld (d. 1045), married one of the daughters of Máel Coluim mac Cináeda (1005–34) and became the ancestor of later Kings of Scots through their son Donnchad (Duncan I) (1034–40).

=== Middle Ages ===
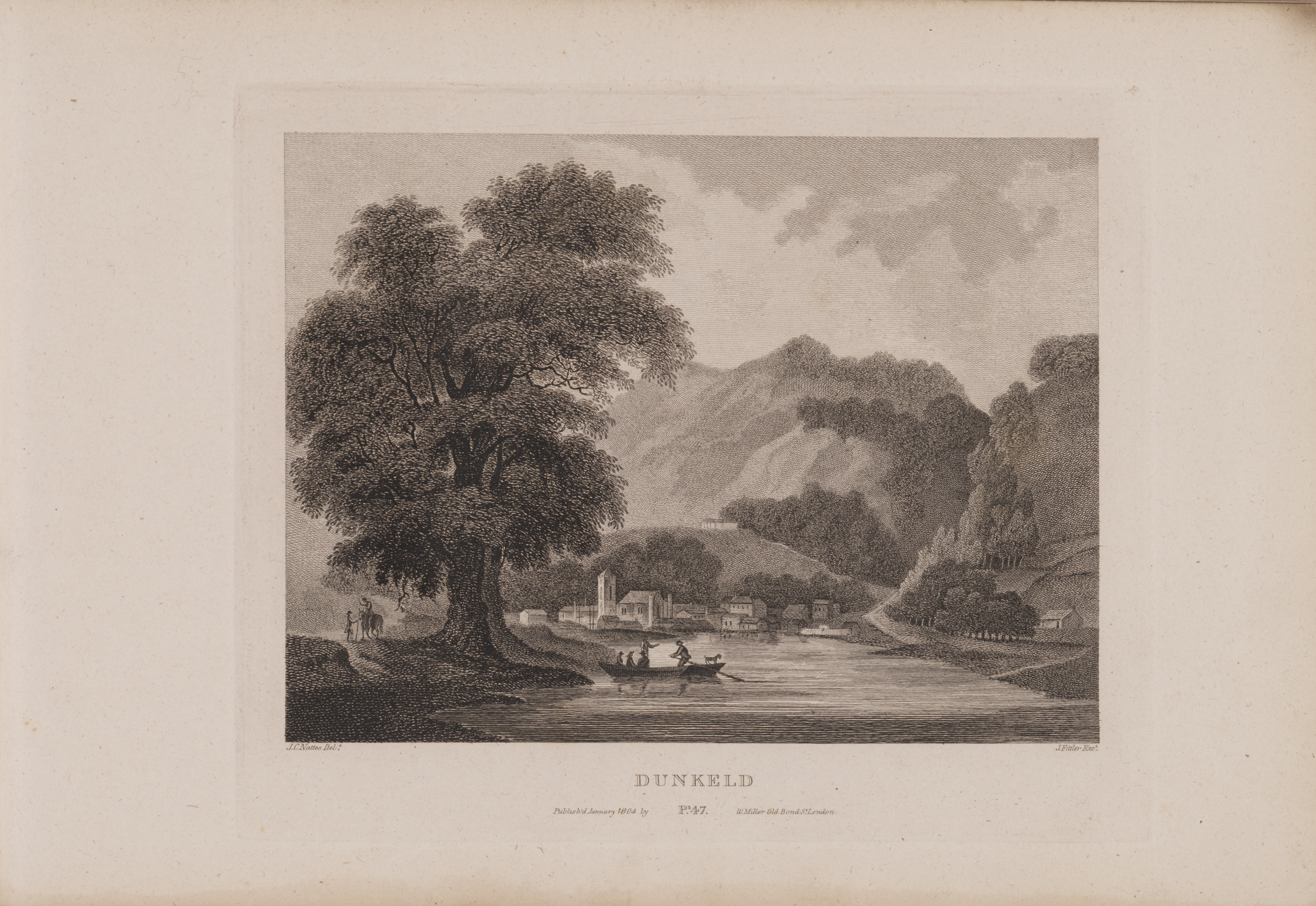
Engraving of Dunkeld by James Fittler in Scotia Depicta, published 1804

The see of Dunkeld was revived by Alexander I (1107–24). Between 1183 and 1189 the newly formed diocese of Argyll was separated from that of Dunkeld, which originally extended to the west coast of Scotland. By 1300 the Bishops of Dunkeld administered a diocese comprising sixty parish churches, a number of them oddly scattered within the sees of St Andrews and Dunblane.

The much-restored cathedral choir, still in use as the parish church, is unaisled and dates to the 13th and 14th centuries. The aisled nave was erected from the early 15th century. The western tower, south porch and chapter house (which houses the cathedral museum) were added between 1450 and 1475. The cathedral was stripped of its rich furnishings after the mid-16th century Reformation and its iconoclasm. The nave and porch have been roofless since the early 17th century. They and the tower in the 21st century are in the care of Historic Environment Scotland.

Below the ceiling vault of the tower ground floor are remnants of pre-Reformation murals showing biblical scenes (c. 1490), one of very few such survivals in Scotland. The clearest to survive is a representation of the Judgement of Solomon. This reflects the medieval use of this space as the Bishop's Court. Within the tower are preserved fragments of stonework associated with the cathedral and the surrounding area, including a Pictish carving of a horseman with a spear and drinking-horn, and a number of medieval grave-monuments.

The cathedral museum is housed in the former chapter house and sacristy, on the north side of the choir. After the Reformation this chamber was used as a burial aisle by the Earls, Marquises and Dukes of Atholl, and contains a number of elaborate monuments of the 17th-early 19th centuries.

=== Battle of Dunkeld (1689) ===
Most of the original town was destroyed during the Battle of Dunkeld when, on 21 August 1689, the 26th Foot (Cameronian Regiment), under Lieutenant William Cleland (who died in the clash), successfully fought the Jacobites shortly after the latter's victory at the Battle of Killiecrankie. Holes made by musket-ball strikes during the battle can still be seen in the east gable of the cathedral.

=== Later history ===
Dr George Smyttan FRSE HEIC (1789-1863) was born and raised in Dunkeld and retained links to Birnam all his life.

Dunkeld was partly in the parish of Caputh until 1891.

The High Street drill hall in Dunkeld was completed in 1900.

The alignment of the town was radically altered in 1809 by the building of a new stone bridge — Dunkeld Bridge — over the River Tay by Thomas Telford at the east end of the town, and the laying out of a new street (Bridge Street–Atholl Street) at right angles to the old alignment.

== Governance ==
Dunkeld is in the Perth and Kinross council area, and in the Community Council area of Dunkeld and Birnam, which also includes Amulree, Butterstone, Dalguise, Kindallachan, Loch Ordie, and Strathbraan.

It is in the Perthshire North constituency for the Scottish Parliament where as of 2024 has been represented since 2011 by John Swinney for the SNP. It is in the Angus and Perthshire Glens constituency for the UK Parliament, where as of 2024 it is represented by Dave Doogan for the SNP.

== Townscape ==
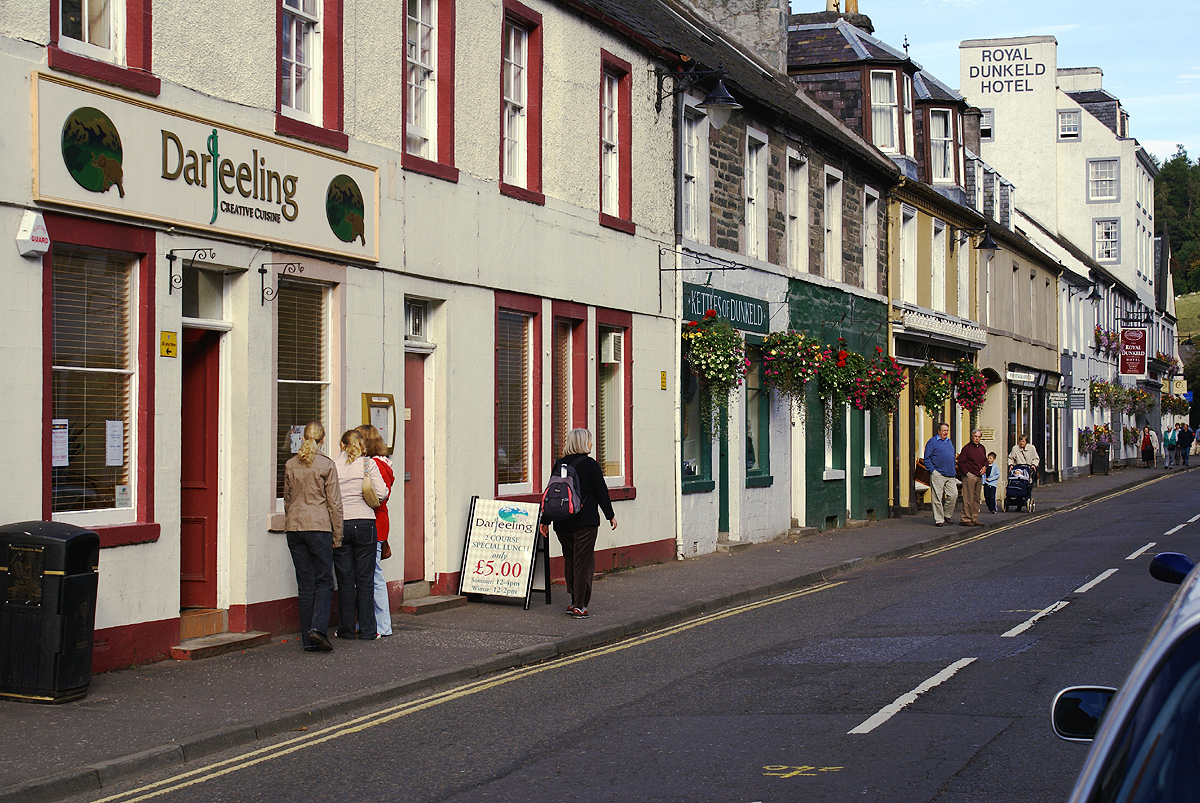
Atholl Street, the main street of Dunkeld

The rebuilt town of Dunkeld is one of the most complete 18th-century country towns in Scotland. Many of the harled (rough-cast) vernacular buildings have been restored by the National Trust for Scotland (NTS). The present street layout of the older part of town consists of a 'Y-shaped' arrangement, parallel with the River Tay, comprising a single street (Brae Street/High Street) sloping down from the east into the long 'V' of the market place, known as The Cross. Closes (lanes) leading off this main street give access to the backlands of the houses (a traditional arrangement in Scottish towns). On the site of the traditional mercat cross, the fanciful neo-Gothic Atholl Memorial Fountain was built in 1866, as a monument to George Murray, 6th Duke of Atholl (1814–64). The Fountain is notable for its heraldry and Masonic symbolism, the 6th Duke having been Grand Master of the Grand Lodge of Scotland, 1843–64.

At the west end of The Cross is The Ell Shop (NTS), built 1757, which takes its name from the iron ell (weaver's measure) fixed against one corner. This building is said to have been built on the site of the town's medieval hospital, dedicated to St George. At the north-west corner of the same row is the Duchess of Atholl Girls' School, erected 1853 in neo-Gothic style, designed by R & R Dickson. It is generally known as the Duchess Anne after its founder Anne Home-Drummond (1814–97), spouse of the 6th Duke of Atholl and Mistress of the Robes to Queen Victoria. The building is used for exhibition and other purposes, notably the popular annual Dunkeld Art Exhibition in summer.

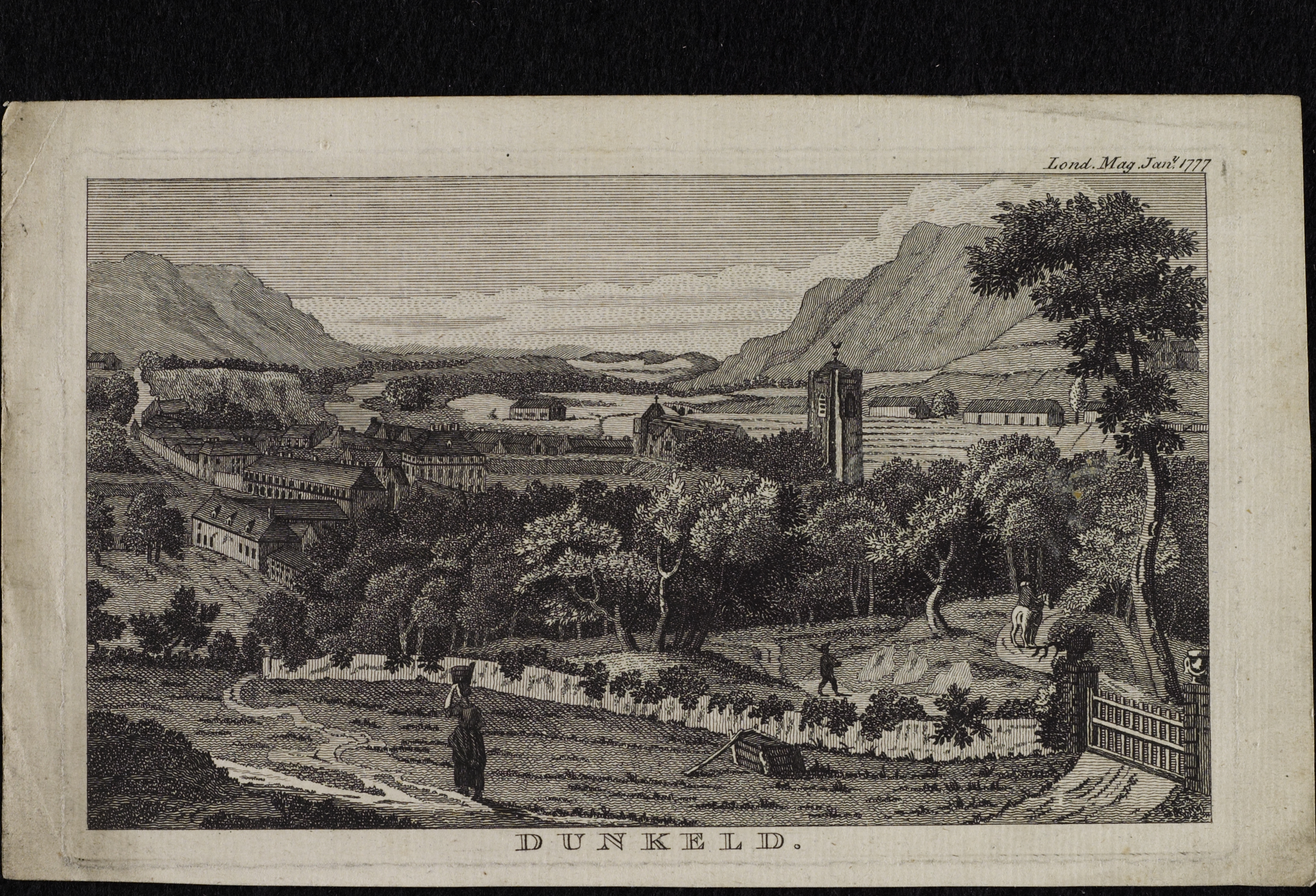
Historic view of Dunkeld from The London Magazine, January 1777

The left arm of the 'Y' leads along Cathedral Street to the medieval cathedral, and the right arm (now largely blocked off) originally led to Dunkeld House, built by Sir William Bruce in 1676-84 for the 1st Marquis of Atholl. Demolished in 1827, this was one of Scotland's major 17th-century mansions. A neo-Gothic replacement was begun on the same site but never completed (no visible remains). The area around the cathedral was the original focus of settlement in Dunkeld in medieval (and doubtless earlier) times. Here stood the manses of the Cathedral clergy, with the Bishop's Palace to the west of the church.

== Surrounding countryside ==
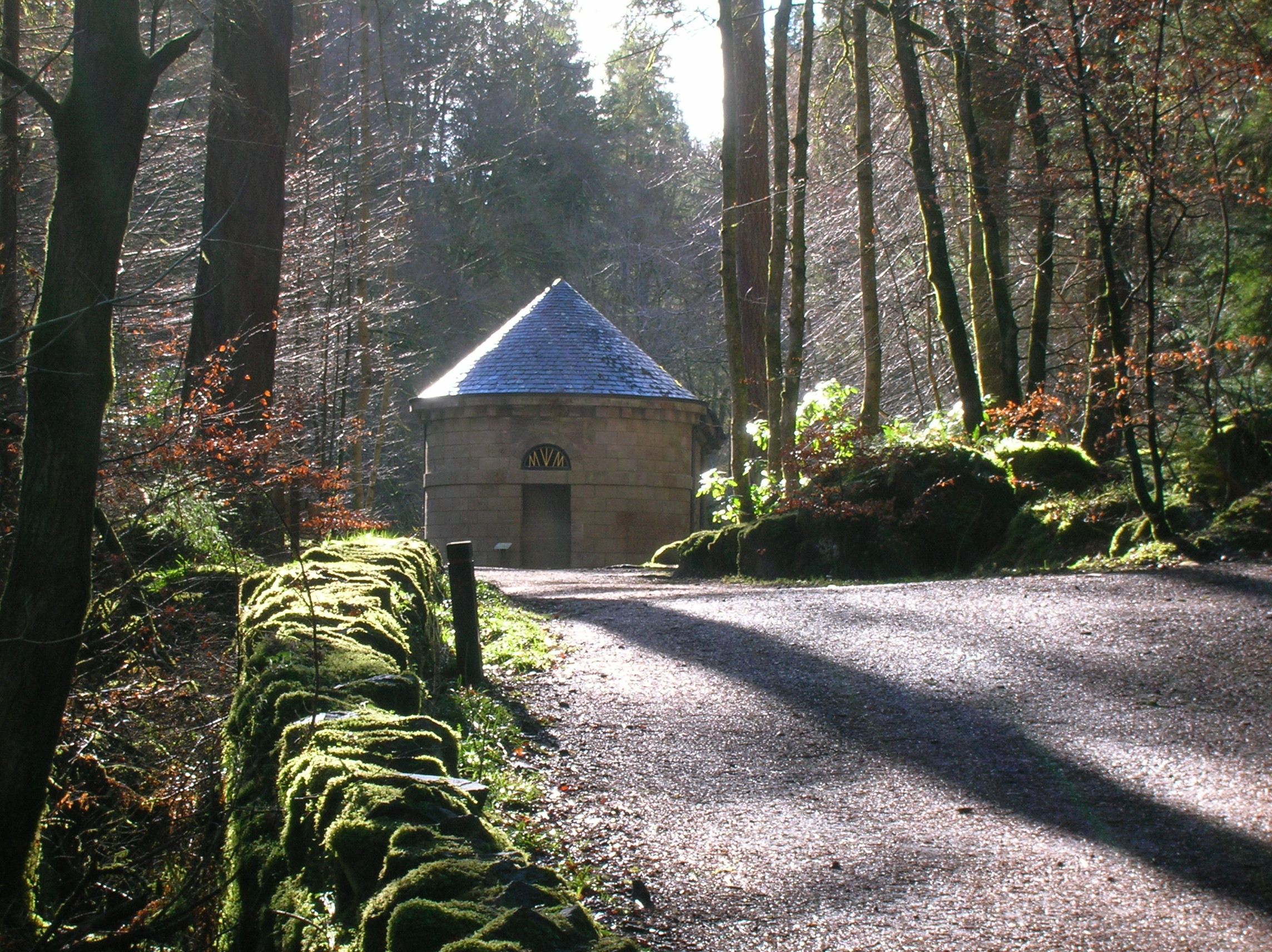
Ossian's Hall of Mirrors stands in the Craigvinean Forest near Dunkeld

Dunkeld is situated in an area of Scotland marketed as Big Tree Country. The area is heavily wooded, and has some notable trees, including the Birnam Oak, believed to be the only remaining tree from the Birnam Wood named by Shakespeare in his play Macbeth:

MACBETH: I will not be afraid of death and bane, till Birnam forest come to Dunsinane.

— Shakespeare, Macbeth, Act 5, scene 3.

Other significant trees in the area include Niel Gow's Oak, the tree under which Niel Gow, a fiddler under contract to three of the Dukes of Atholl, composed many of Scotland's famous strathspeys and reels. It stands near Gow's home at Inver. The Parent Larch near Dunkeld cathedral is the sole survivor from a group of larches collected from the mountains of the Tyrol mountains in 1738, and which were the seed source for large-scale larch plantings in the local area.

Much of the countryside surrounding the town is designated as a national scenic area (NSA), one of 40 such areas in Scotland, which are defined so as to identify areas of exceptional scenery and to ensure its protection by restricting certain forms of development. The River Tay (Dunkeld) NSA covers 5,708 hectares (14,100 acres). Parts of the area also form part of the Tay Forest Park, a network of forests managed by Forestry and Land Scotland that are spread across the Highland parts of Perthshire. About 2 miles (3 kilometres) northeast of the town is the Loch of the Lowes nature reserve, managed by the Scottish Wildlife Trust.

There are many walks in the area. The 1,324 feet (404 m) summit of Birnam Hill (on Murthly Estate) lies 1 mile (2 km) south of the railway station and is easily ascended from there, or from a car park to the east. Newtyle (996 feet (304 m)) and Craigiebarns (900 feet (270 m)) are in the immediate vicinity, while Craig Vinean (1,247 feet (380 m)) is on the opposite side of the river, along with Birnam Hill.

Ossian's Hall of Mirrors is a folly on the pleasure grounds known as The Hermitage, close to Dunkeld. The site is owned by the National Trust for Scotland, and has walks in the wooded scenery surrounding the River Braan.

== Tourism and culture ==
Its location on the middle section of the River Tay makes it a hub for salmon and trout angling. A few miles downstream at Caputh, Georgina Ballantine landed the largest salmon ever recorded in Britain.

Dunkeld & Birnam Golf Club is located to the north of Dunkeld and overlooks Loch of the Lowes.

Across the Telford Bridge, the Birnam Highland games take place annually in Little Dunkeld.

== Transport ==
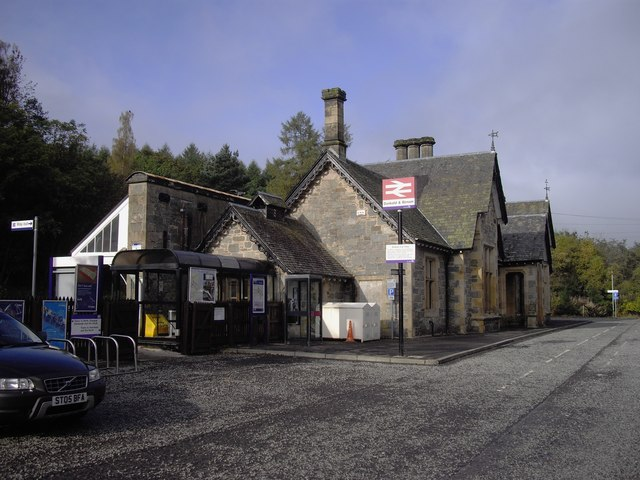
Dunkeld and Birnam Railway Station

The A9 through Dunkeld was bypassed by a new section of road in 1977. The town is now approximately one hour from Glasgow and Edinburgh, and two hours from Inverness, by car. There are regular bus and coach services to Birnam and Dunkeld along the A9, with long-distance coaches operated by Scottish Citylink. There is access by rail at Dunkeld & Birnam railway station on the Highland Main Line route between Perth and Inverness. Most services on the route extend to either Edinburgh Waverley or Glasgow Queen Street; on Sundays only a southbound train operated by the East Coast Main Line operator extends to London King's Cross via Edinburgh, although there is no corresponding northbound service from London. A daily (except Saturday) London service is offered by the overnight Caledonian Sleeper trains to and from London Euston.

== Twin town ==
Dunkeld is twinned with Asheville, North Carolina, United States.

== See also ==
- Guay railway station
- House of Dunkeld
