= Flora of Scotland =

Plants native to Scotland

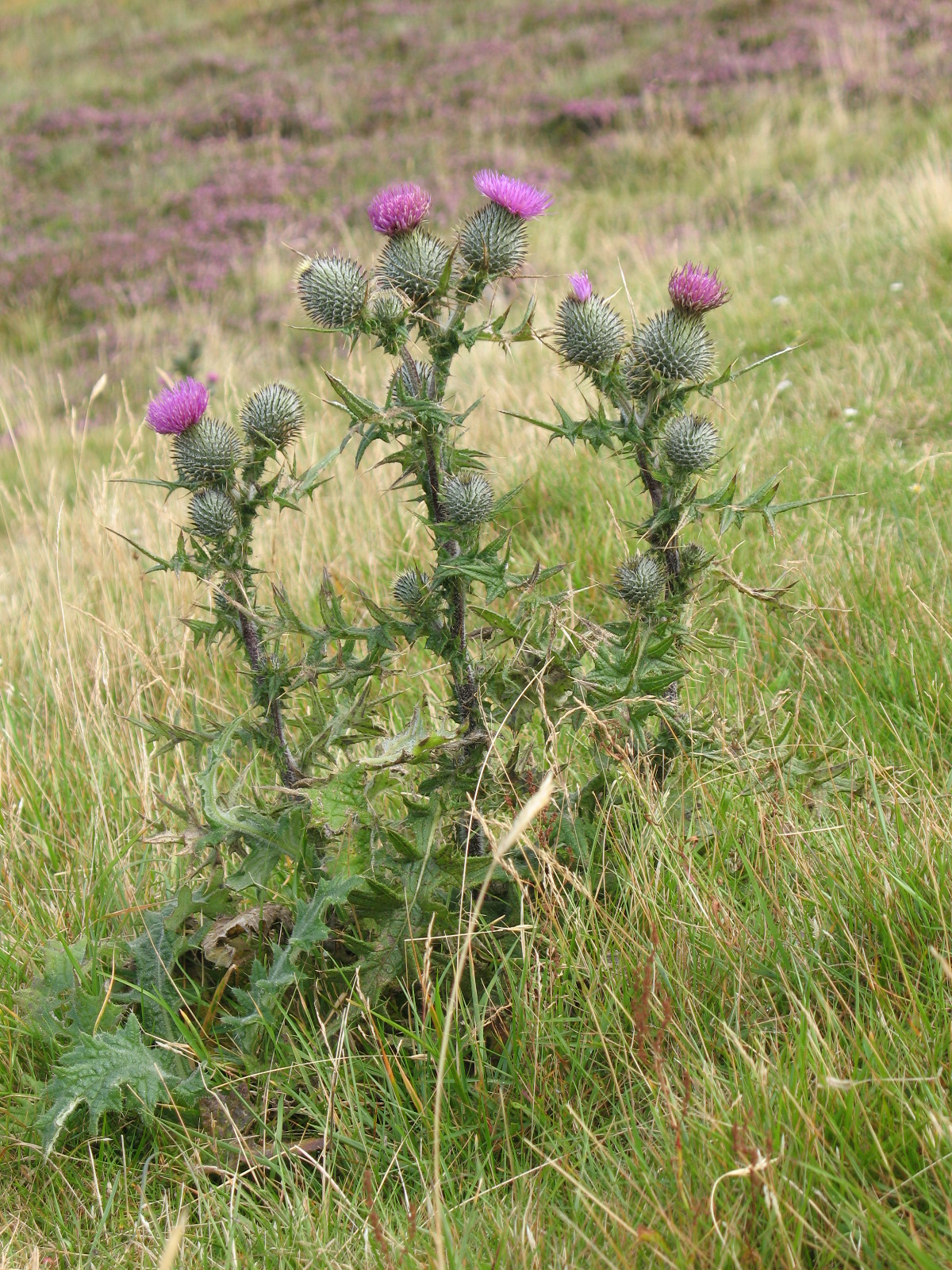
Spear Thistle

The flora of Scotland is an assemblage of native plant species including over 1,600 vascular plants, more than 1,500 lichens and nearly 1,000 bryophytes. The total number of vascular species is low by world standards but lichens and bryophytes are abundant and the latter form a population of global importance. Various populations of rare fern exist, although the impact of 19th-century collectors threatened the existence of several species. The flora is generally typical of the north-west European part of the Palearctic realm and prominent features of the Scottish flora include boreal Caledonian forest (much reduced from its natural extent), heather moorland and coastal machair. In addition to the native species of vascular plants there are numerous non-native introductions, now believed to make up some 43% of the species in the country.

There are a variety of important tree species and specimens; in particular, the Fortingall Yew may be the oldest tree in Europe. The Arran whitebeams, Shetland mouse-ear and Scottish primrose are endemic flowering plants and there are a variety of endemic mosses and lichens. Conservation of the natural environment is well developed and various organisations play an important role in the stewardship of the country's flora. Numerous references to the country's flora appear in folklore, song and poetry.

== Habitats ==
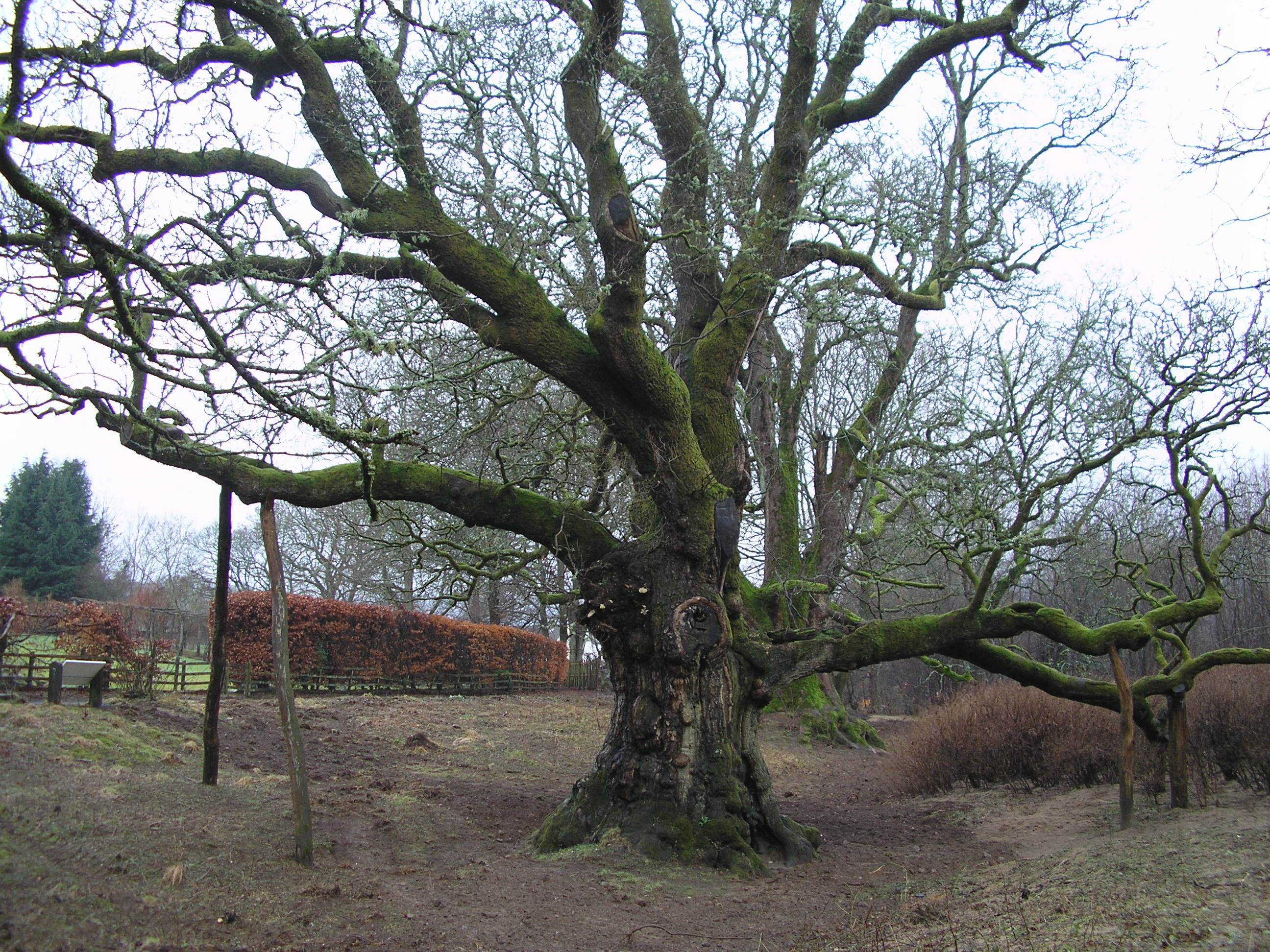
The Birnam Oak in Strathtay

Map of Scotland's land cover

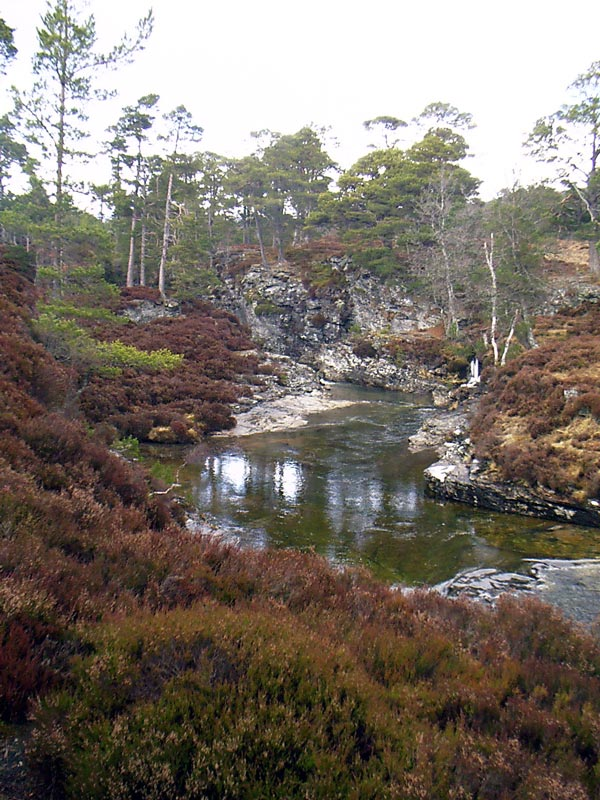
Typical upland scenery with Scots Pine (Pinus sylvestris), Silver Birch (Betula pendula) and Heather (Calluna vulgaris)

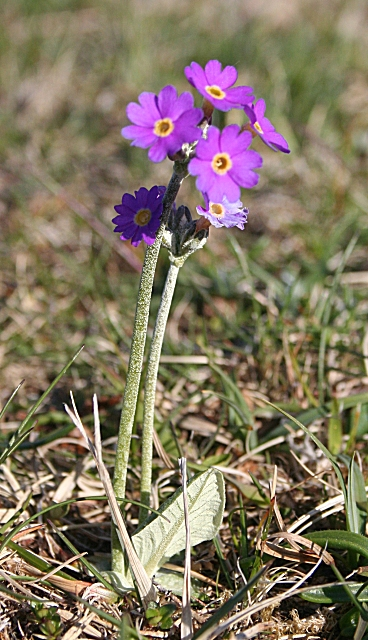
A Scottish Primrose (Primula scotica) growing near Durness

Scotland enjoys a diversity of temperate ecologies, incorporating both deciduous and coniferous woodlands, and moorland, montane, estuarine, freshwater, oceanic, and tundra landscapes. Approximately 19% of Scotland is wooded, 14.5% of which is non-native forestry plantation, but prior to human clearing there were much larger areas of boreal Caledonian and broad-leaved forest. Although reduced significantly (some estimates are as high as 98%), significant remnants of the native Scots Pine woodlands can be found in places. Some 21 to 31% of Scotland is covered by heather moorland, while over 20% of Scotland is covered by peatland. Caithness and Sutherland have some of the largest and most intact areas of blanket bog in the world, supporting a distinctive wildlife community. 75% of Scotland's land is classed as agricultural (including some of its moorland) with urban areas accounting for around 3% of the total. The number of islands with terrestrial vegetation is nearly 800, about 600 of them lying off the west coast. Scotland has more than 90% of the volume and 70% of the total surface area of fresh water in the United Kingdom. There are more than 30,000 freshwater lochs and 6,600 river systems.

Below the tree line there are several zones of climax forest. Birch dominates to the west and north, Scots pine with birch and oak in the eastern Highlands and oak (both Quercus robur and Q. petrea) with birch in the Central Lowlands and Borders. The Scottish coastline includes machair, a fertile grassy duneland formed as the land rose after the last ice age. Machairs have received considerable ecological and conservational attention.

== Flowering plants and shrubs ==
The total number of vascular species is low by world standards, partly due to the effects of Pleistocene glaciations (which eliminated all or nearly all species) and the subsequent creation of the North Sea (which created a barrier to re-colonisation). Nonetheless, there are a variety of important species and assemblages. Heather moor containing ling, bell heather, cross-leaved heath, bog myrtle and fescues is generally abundant and contains various smaller flowering species such as cloudberry and alpine ladies-mantle. Cliffs and mountains host a diversity of arctic and alpine plants including alpine pearlwort, mossy cyphel, mountain avens and fir clubmoss. On the Hebridean islands of the west coast, there are Plantago pastures, which grow well in locations exposed to sea spray and include red fescue, sea plantain and sea pink. The machair landscapes include rare species such as Irish lady's tresses, yellow rattle and numerous orchids along with more common species such as marram grass and meadow buttercup, ragwort, bird's-foot trefoil and ribwort plantain. Scots lovage (Ligusticum scoticum) first recorded in 1684 by Robert Sibbald, and the oyster plant are uncommon plants of the coasts.

=== Aquatic species ===
Bogbean and water lobelia are common plants of moorland pools and lochans. The least (Nuphar pumila), yellow and white water-lilies are also widespread. Pipewort has generated some botanical controversy regarding its discovery, classification and distribution. It was found growing on Skye in the 18th century, although there was subsequent confusion as to both the discoverer and the correct scientific name – now agreed to be Eriocaulon aquaticum. The European range of this plant is confined to Scotland and western Ireland and it is one of only a small number of species which is common in North America, but very restricted in Europe. There are a few localised examples of the rigid hornwort (Ceratophyllum demersum).

=== Grasses and sedges ===
Grasses and sedges are common everywhere except dune systems (where marram grass may be locally abundant) and stony mountain tops and plateaux. The total number of species is large; 84 have been recorded on the verges of a single road in West Lothian. Smooth meadow-grass and rough meadow-grass are widespread in damp lowland conditions, wood sedge (Carex sylvatica) in woodlands, and oval sedge and early hair-grass on upland moors. In damp conditions Phragmites reeds and several species of Juncus are found abundantly including jointed rush, soft rush and toad rush, and less commonly the introduced species slender rush. Common cottongrass is a familiar site on marshy land, but saltmarsh sedge (Carex salina) was only discovered for the first time in 2004 at the head of Loch Duich.

=== Endemic species ===
Shetland mouse-ear (Cerastium nigrescens) is an endemic plant found in Shetland. It was first recorded in 1837 by Shetland botanist Thomas Edmondston. Although reported from two other sites in the 19th century, it currently grows only on two serpentine hills on the island of Unst. The Scottish primrose (Primula scotica), is endemic to the north coast including Caithness and Orkney. It is closely related to the Arctic species Primula stricta and Primula scandinavica.

Endemic species of the Hieracium, Rubus and Taraxacum apomictic complexes occur in Scotland, such as the St Kilda dandelion (Taraxacum pankhurstianum), endemic to the island of Hirta, identified in 2012, the orange-flowered hawkweed (Hieracium fulvocaesium), endemic to Strathnaver, the Shetland Hawkweed (Hieracium zetlandicum), endemic to the Shetland Islands, and Rubus longiflorus, endemic to coastal Angus and Kincardine.

=== Rare species ===
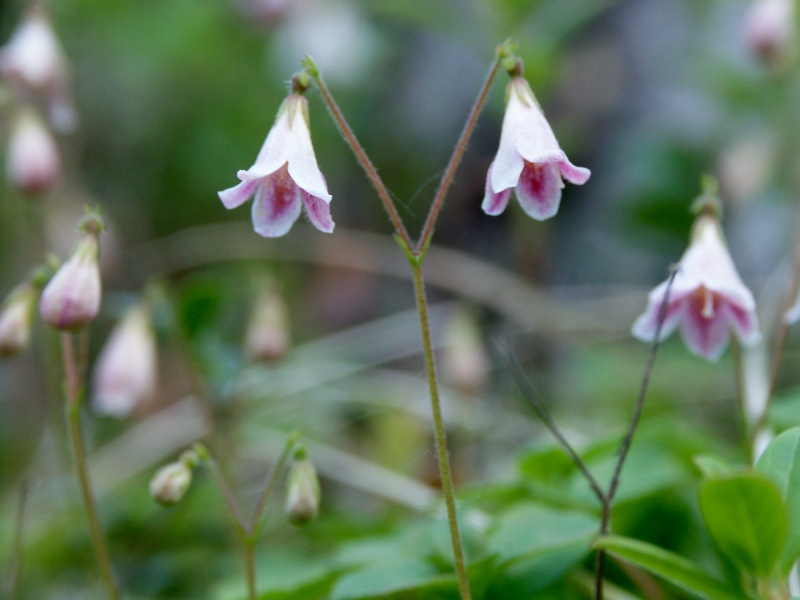
Twinflower (Linnaea borealis)

Some of Scotland's flowering plants have extremely restricted ranges in the country. These include Diapensia lapponica, found only on the slopes of Sgurr an Utha, Argyll and Mountain bearberry, recorded at only a few mainland locations, and on Skye and Orkney. The pinewoods of Strathspey contain rare species such as creeping lady's tresses, twinflower and the one-flowered wintergreen. Plans to protect the Intermediate wintergreen, also found here, were introduced in 2008. Other nationally rare species include tufted saxifrage, alpine catchfly, sword-leaved helleborine, norwegian sandwort, dark-red helleborine, Iceland purslane, small cow-wheat and yellow oxytropis. Young's helleborine (Epipactis helleborine var. youngiana) is a rare endemic orchid principally found on bings created by the coal-mining industry in the Central Lowlands and classified as endangered.

=== Invasive plants ===
Some non-native, invasive species have been identified as a threat to native biodiversity; Giant hogweed, Japanese knotweed, Himalayan balsam and Rhododendron ponticum are generally regarded as the 'big 4'. In May 2008 it was announced that psyllid lice from Japan, which feed on the knotweed, may be introduced to the UK to bring the plant under control. This would be the first time that an alien species has been used in Britain in this way. Scientists at the Commonwealth Agricultural Bureaux International did not believe the lice would cause any environmental damage. Over-grazing caused by the large numbers of red deer and sheep has also resulted in the impoverishment of moorland and upland habitats and a loss of native woodland. In 2012, the Scottish Government published a "Code of Practice on Non-Native Species" to help people understand their responsibilities and provide guidance as to which public body has responsibility for the various habitats involved.

== Naturalised plants ==
Among naturalised plants within the British Isles, some, such as Magellan ragwort and pig fern are restricted to Scotland.

== Deciduous trees ==
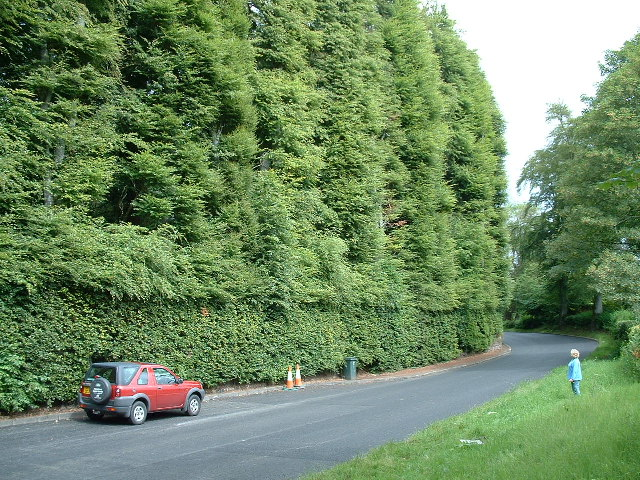
The Meikleour Beech hedge (Fagus sylvatica)

Only 31 species of deciduous tree and shrub are native to Scotland, including 10 willows, four whitebeams and three birch and cherry species.

The Meikleour beech hedges located in Perth and Kinross were planted in the autumn of 1745 by Jean Mercer and her husband, Robert Murray Nairne. This European beech hedge, which is 530 metres (0.33 mi) in length, reaches 30 metres (98 ft) in height and is noted in the Guinness World Records as the tallest and longest hedge on Earth.

The Arran whitebeams are species unique to the Isle of Arran. The Arran whitebeam (Sorbus arranensis) and the cut-leaved whitebeam (S. pseudofennica) are amongst the most endangered tree species in the world if rarity is measured by numbers alone. Only 236 S. pseudofennica and 283 S. arranensis were recorded as mature trees in 1980. The trees developed in a highly complex fashion involving the rock whitebeam (S. rupicola), which is found on nearby Holy Isle but not Arran, interbreeding with the rowan (S. aucuparia) to produce the new species. In 2007 it was announced that two specimens of a third new hybrid, the Catacol whitebeam (S. pseudomeinichii) had been discovered by researchers on Arran. This tree is a cross between the native rowan and S. pseudofennica.

Shakespeare makes reference to Birnam Wood being used as camouflage for Malcolm Canmore's army before the battle at Dunsinane with MacBeth. There is an ancient tree, the Birnam Oak, standing a few hundred metres from the centre of Birnam. It may well have been part of Birnam Wood at the time of the battle 900 years ago, and remains part of the legend.

Research into the possible commercial use of sea buckthorn was undertaken by Moray College commencing in 2006. The orange berries can be processed into jams, liquors and ointments and the hardy species grows well even on exposed west coasts.

== Conifers ==
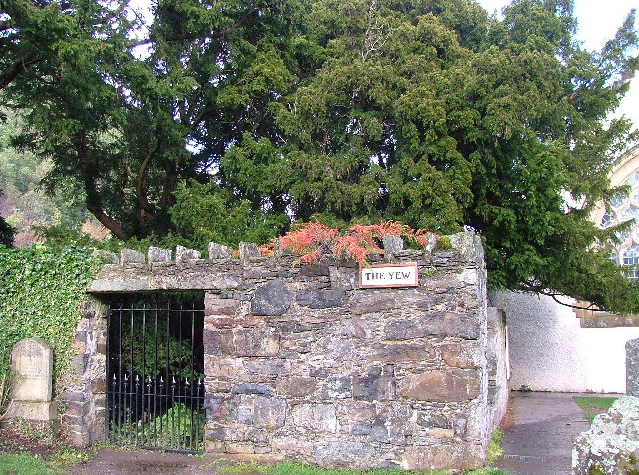
The Fortingall Yew (Taxus baccata)

The Scots pine and Common Juniper are the only coniferous trees definitely native to Scotland, though Yew is also likely native.

The Fortingall Yew is an ancient tree in the churchyard of the village of Fortingall in Perthshire. Various estimates have put its age at between 2,000 and 5,000 years; research into yew tree ages suggests that it is likely to be nearer the lower limit of 2,000 years. This still makes it the oldest tree in Europe, although there is a clonal colony of Norway spruce in Sweden that may be older.

== Ferns ==
Bracken is very common in upland areas, beech fern in woods and other shaded locations and scaly male fern in wooded or open areas. Wilsons filmy-fern is an uncommon upland variety in the Highlands, along with the Tunbridge filmy-fern, Alpine lady-fern and the rarer stunted form Newman's lady-fern (Athyrium distentifolium var. flexile) which is endemic to Scotland. The Killarney fern, once found on Arran was thought to be extinct in Scotland, but has been discovered on Skye in its gametophyte form.

Scotland's populations of alpine woodsia and oblong woodsia are on the edge of their natural ranges. The UK distribution of the former is confined to Angus, Perthshire, Argyll and north Wales, and of the latter to Angus, the Moffat Hills, north Wales and two locations in England. The plants were first identified as separate species by John Bolton in 1785 and came under severe threat from Victorian fern collectors in the mid 19th century. Cystopteris dickieana, first discovered in a sea cave in Kincardineshire, is a rare fern in a UK context whose distribution is confined to Scotland, although recent research suggests that it may be a variant of C. fragilis rather than a species in its own right.

== Non-vascular plants ==
Scotland provides ideal growing conditions for many bryophyte species, due to the damp climate, absence of lengthy droughts and winters without protracted hard frosts. In addition, the country's diverse geology, numerous exposed rocky crags and screes and deep, damp ravines coupled with a relatively pollution-free atmosphere enables a diversity of species to exist. This unique assemblage is in marked contrast to the relative impoverishment of the native vascular plants. There are about 920 species of moss and liverwort in Scotland, with 87% of UK and 60% of European bryophytes represented. Scotland's bryophyte flora is globally important and this small country may host as many as 5% of the world's species (in 0.05% of the Earth's land area, similar in size to South Carolina or Assam). The mountains of the North-west Highlands host a unique bryophyte community called the "Northern Hepatic Mat", which is dominated by a variety of rare liverworts, such as Pleurozia purpurea and Anastrophyllum alpinum.

Scotland has played an important part in the development of the understanding of bryology, with pioneers such as Archibald Menzies and Sir William Hooker commencing explorations at the end of the eighteenth century. Tetrodontium brownianum is named after Robert Brown who first discovered the plant growing at Roslin near Edinburgh and several other species such as Plagiochila atlantica and Anastrepta orcadensis were also first discovered in the country.

=== Mosses ===
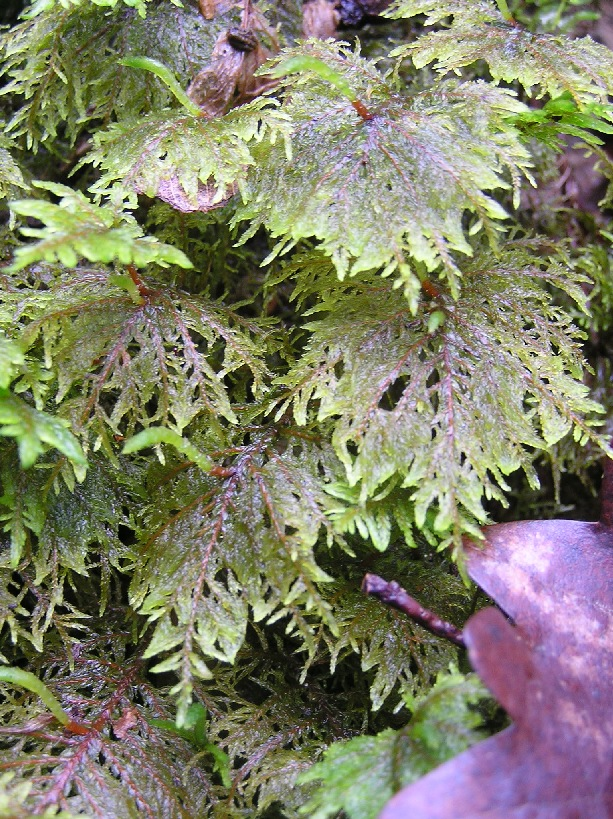
Glittering Wood-moss (Hylocomium splendens)

Sphagnum is common and harvested commercially for use in hanging baskets and wreaths and for medical purposes. glittering wood-moss, woolly hair-moss (Racomitrium lanuginosum) and bristly haircap (Polytrichum piliferum) are amongst many other abundant natives. Endemic species include the Scottish thread-moss, Dixon's thread moss and Scottish beard-moss. In the Cairngorms there are small stands of snow brook-moss and alpine thyme-moss, and an abundance of icy rock-moss, the latter's UK population being found only here and at one site in England. The west coast is rich in oceanic mosses such as Cyclodictyon laetevirens and the Ben Lawers range also provides habitats for various rare species such as tongue-leaved gland moss. Perthshire beard-moss is a European endemic, occurring at only four European sites outside Scotland and it is classified as "Critically Endangered".

=== Liverworts and hornworts ===
There are numerous common liverworts such as Conocephalum conicum and Marchantia polymorpha. Autumn flapwort (Jamesoniella autumnali), a nationally scarce species most commonly found in the sessile oak woods of western Scotland, was discovered at a site on Ben Lomond in 2008. The species is named after the Scottish botanist, William Jameson. Northern prongwort is an endemic liverwort found only in the Beinn Eighe nature reserve. The high Cairngorms provide sites for a variety of other unusual liverworts including Marsupella arctica, the European distribution of which is confined to two sites here and Svalbard.

Hornworts are scarce in Scotland, Carolina hornwort (Phaeoceros carolinianus) for example, having been found only in Lauderdale.

== Conservation ==
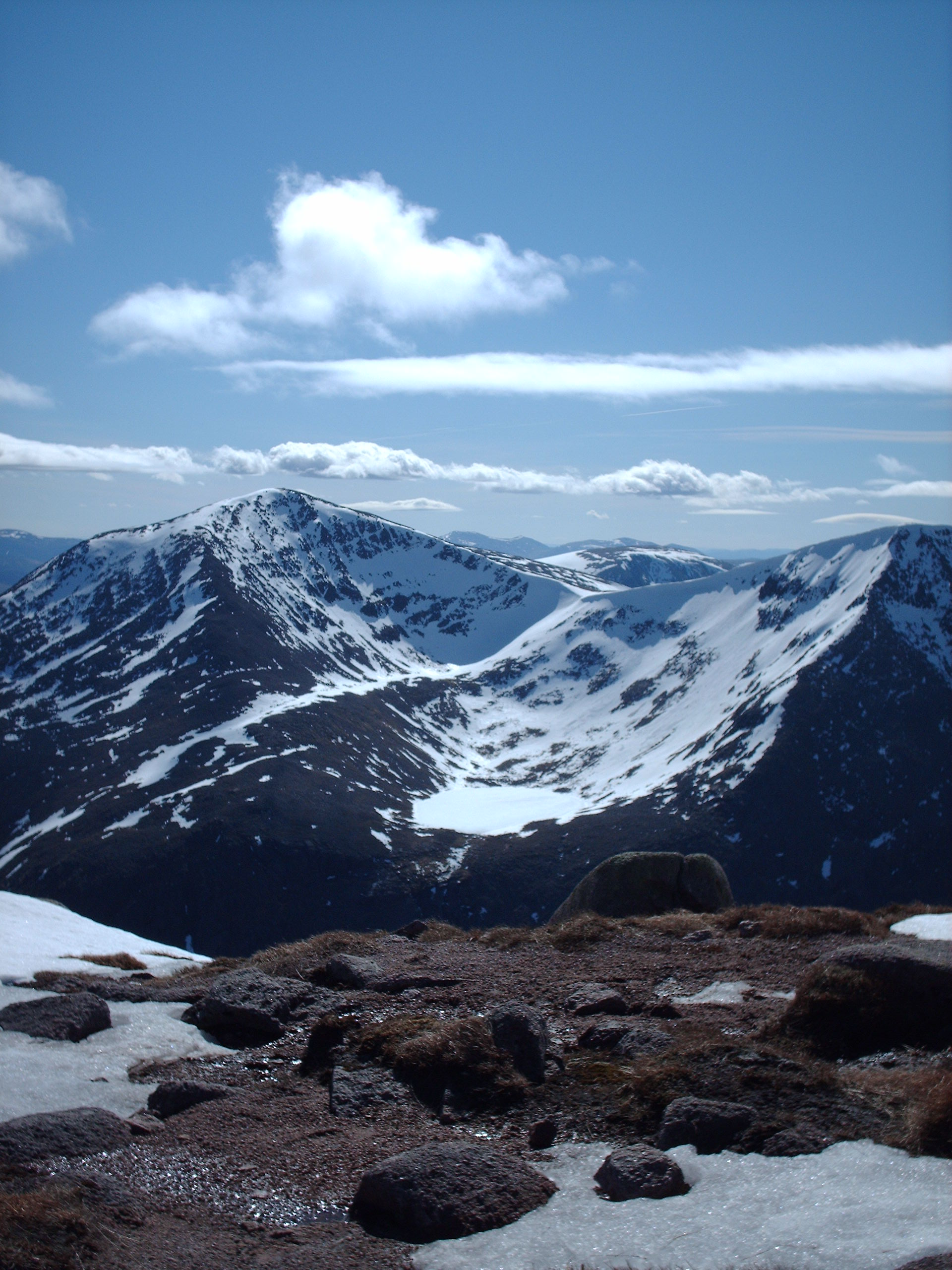
Cairn Toul and The Angel's Peak, Cairngorms National Park

Conservation of the natural environment is well-developed in the United Kingdom. There are various public sector organisations with an important role in the stewardship of the country's flora. NatureScot is the statutory body responsible for natural heritage management in Scotland. One of their duties is to establish National Nature Reserves. Until 2004 there were 73, but a review carried out in that year resulted in a significant number of sites losing their NNR status, and as of 2022 there are 43. Forestry and Land Scotland serves as the forestry department of the Scottish Government and is one of the country's largest landowners. The Joint Nature Conservation Committee is the statutory adviser on conservation to Government on all four nations of the UK including Scotland.

The country has two national parks. Cairngorms National Park includes the largest area of arctic mountain landscape in the UK. Sites designated as of importance to natural heritage take up 39% of the land area, two-thirds of which are of Europe-wide importance. Loch Lomond and the Trossachs National Park includes Britain's largest body of freshwater, the mountains of Breadalbane and the sea lochs of Argyll.

Numerous charitable and voluntary organisations play important roles. The BSBI and Plantlife are examples of plant-specific bodies which operate in Scotland. The National Trust for Scotland is the conservation charity that protects and promotes Scotland's natural and cultural heritage. The Royal Society for the Protection of Birds promotes conservation of birds and other wildlife through the protection and re-creation of habitats. The John Muir Trust is a charity whose main role is as a guardian of wild land and wildlife, through the ownership of land and the promotion of education and conservation. The trust owns and manages estates in various locations, including Knoydart, Assynt, and on the isle of Skye. Trees for Life is a charity that aims to restore a "wild forest" in the Northwest Highlands and Grampian Mountains.

The Wildlife and Countryside Act 1981 prohibits the uprooting of plants without a landowner's permission and the collection of any part of the most threatened species, which are listed in Schedule 8.

In 2024, the traditional practice of muirburn, the intentional burning of moorland, was banned, if carried out without a licence, by the Scottish parliament.

== Flora in Scottish culture ==
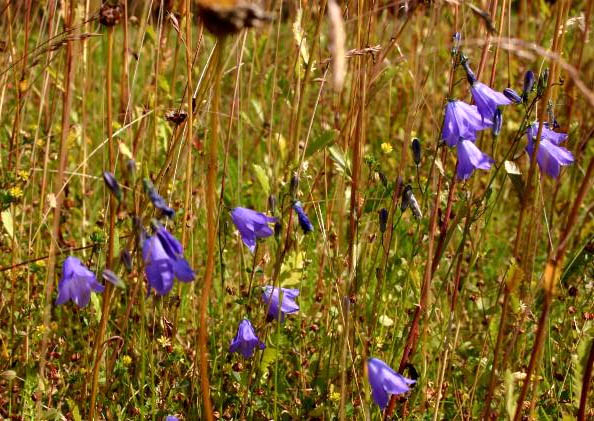
Campanula rotundifolia, the Scottish Bluebell

Plants feature heavily in Gaelic and Scottish folklore, song and poetry.

The thistle has been one of the national emblems of the Scots nation since the reign of Alexander III (1249–1286) and was used on silver coins issued by James III in 1470. Today, it forms part of the emblem of the Scottish Rugby Union. As legend has it, an invading army had attempted to sneak up at night on the Scots. One, perhaps barefooted, unwelcome foreign soldier stumbled upon a Scots Thistle, and cried out in pain, thus alerting Scots to their presence. Some sources suggest the specific occasion was the Battle of Largs, which marked the beginning of the departure of the Viking monarch Haakon IV of Norway, who had harried the coast for some years.

Numerous plants are referred to in Scottish song and verse. These include Robert Burns' A Red, Red Rose, Hugh MacDiarmid's A Drunk Man Looks at the Thistle, Sorley MacLean's Hallaig, Harry Lauder's I Love A Lassie and in the 21st century, Runrig's And The Accordions Played. The last two lyrics include a reference to the bluebell. The Scottish bluebell is Campanula rotundifolia, (known elsewhere as the harebell) rather than Hyacinthoides non-scripta, the common bluebell.

Trees held an important place in Gaelic culture from the earliest times. Particularly large trees were venerated, and the most valuable such as oak, hazel and apple were classed as "nobles". The less important alder, hawthorn and gean were classed as "commoners", and there were "lower orders" and "slaves" such as aspen and juniper. The alphabet was learned as a mnemonic using tree names. Rowan was regularly planted close to Highland houses as a protection from witchcraft.

Various plants are said to have apotropaic qualities, notably rowan. Henbane (Hyoscyamus niger) may have been used as a hallucinogen as long ago as the Neolithic period.

== See also ==
- Botanical Society of Scotland
- Gardens in Scotland
- Category:Scottish botanists
- List of Scottish plants
- Category:Lists of vascular plants of the British Isles
- List of the mosses of Britain and Ireland
- Fauna of Scotland
- Traditional dyes of the Scottish Highlands, many of which use plants
- Forestry in Scotland
