= Birnam Wood (disambiguation) =

Birnam Wood is a town in Scotland.

Birnam Wood or Birnamwood may also refer to:

- Birnamwood, Wisconsin
- Birnamwood (town), Wisconsin
- Birnam Wood (novel), a novel by Eleanor Catton

== See also ==
- Birnam Oak, an Oak tree in Birnam Wood, Scotland
