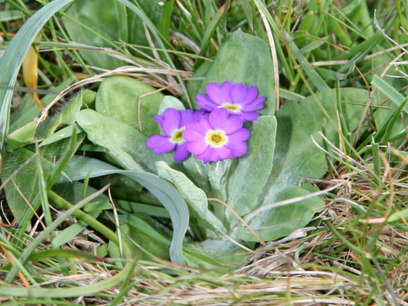

Scientific classification
- Kingdom: Plantae
- Clade: Tracheophytes
- Clade: Angiosperms
- Clade: Eudicots
- Clade: Asterids
- Order: Ericales
- Family: Primulaceae
- Genus: Primula
- Species: P. scotica

Binomial name
- Primula scotica Hook.
- The range of Primula scotica.

Synonyms
- Aleuritia scotica (Hook.) J. Sojak

= Primula scotica =

Species of flowering plant

Primula scotica, commonly known as Scottish primrose, is a species of flowering plant in the family, Primulaceae, the primroses and their relatives. It was first described by James Smith, and is endemic to the northern coast of Scotland.

== Description ==
Primula scotica is a low perennial or sometimes biennial plant only a few centimetres tall, even when in full bloom, with mealy stems and leaves. The leaves are broadest at the middle and are not toothed and form a low rosette. It has small, purple flowers around 8 millimetres (0.31 in) in diameter with five heart-shaped purple petals and a bright yellow eye in the centre. The sepals are rounded and rather blunt.

== Distribution ==
Primula scotica is endemic to northern Scotland where it is found along the northern, Pentland Firth, coast of the mainland in the Highland in the former counties of Caithness and Sutherland and on the other side of the Pentland Firth in the Orkney Islands. A survey in 2008 found the Scottish primrose to be present at 194 sites from Durness in Sutherland to Dunbeath in north eastern Caithness.

== Habitat and biology ==
Primula scotica grows in coastal heaths and grassland. The majority of the sites where this species occurs are within a few hundred metres of the sea and there is normally a mosaic of heath, grassland and rocky outcrops.

P. scotica can only reproduce from seed. It comes into flower twice each year, the first flowering takes place in the early spring and the second in the summer; however, some plants do not flower. Reproduction is normally through self-fertilisation but when the plants are cross-pollinated by insects this can lead to longer-lived more vigorous plants. This species requires short vegetation to survive and can often be a coloniser of small areas of bare soil, for example in the slots made by the hoofs of ungulates. Scottish primroses are perennial and once they are mature they can persist at a site long after it has become unsuitable for germination. Severe winters can lead to high mortality of young plants.

== Taxonomy ==
Primula scotica is most closely related to Primula scandinavica which occurs in Norway and north-west Sweden, and more distantly to the Arctic species Primula stricta.

== Threats and conservation ==
Primula scotica requires short vegetation and its habitat can become unsuitable if grazing is too light, similarly too heavy grazing can also have a deleterious effect on the quality of habitat, especially if the plants are consumed by the herbivores. There has also been a loss of habitat to agricultural intensification and to tree planting. Climate change is also a threat to this species which is sensitive to extremes of climate. Conservation of a few sites with appropriate management, such as grazing, should secure this rare plant which has low genetic diversity.

== Culture ==
Primula scotica is the county flower of Caithness and was the original symbol of the Scottish Wildlife Trust.
