= Protected areas of Scotland =

Designated area for protection in Scotland

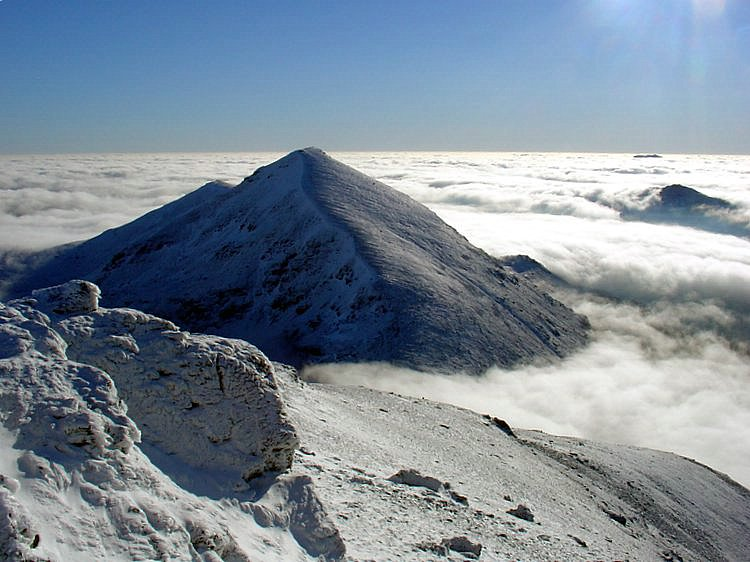
The mountain of Stob Binnein lies in the Loch Lomond and The Trossachs National Park.

Many parts of Scotland are protected in accordance with a number of national and international designations because of their environmental, historical or cultural value. Protected areas can be divided according to the type of resource which each seeks to protect. NatureScot has various roles in the delivery of many environmental designations in Scotland, i.e. those aimed at protecting flora and fauna, scenic qualities and geological features. Historic Environment Scotland is responsible for designations that protect sites of historic and cultural importance. Some international designations, such as World Heritage Sites, can cover both categories of site.

The various designations overlap considerably with many protected areas being covered by multiple designations with different boundaries.

== National environmental designations ==
=== National parks ===
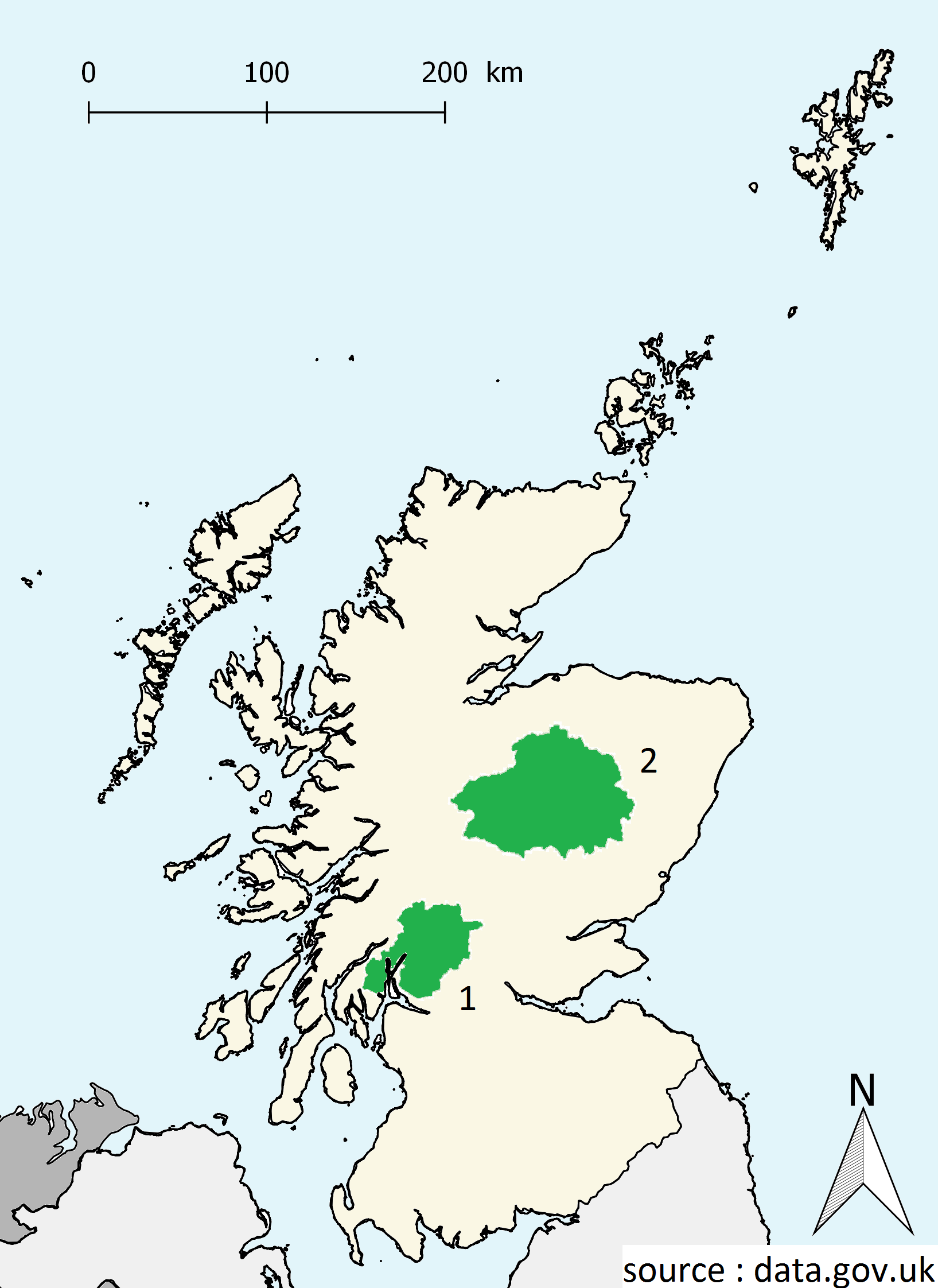
Map of the national parks of Scotland

The national parks of Scotland are managed areas of outstanding landscape where some forms of development are restricted to preserve the landscape and natural environment. At present, Scotland has two national parks: Loch Lomond and The Trossachs National Park, created in 2002, and the Cairngorms National Park, created in 2003.

Unlike the national parks of many other countries, the national parks of Scotland are not areas of uninhabited land owned by the state. The majority of the land is in the ownership of private landowners (including conservation bodies such as the National Trust for Scotland), and people continue to live and work in the parks. Although the landscapes often appear "wild" in character, the land is not wilderness, as it has been worked by humans for thousands of years. Like their English and Welsh counterparts the national parks of Scotland are effectively "managed landscapes", and are classified as IUCN Category V Protected Landscapes because of this.

=== National nature reserves ===
National nature reserves (NNRs) are areas of land or water designated under the Wildlife and Countryside Act 1981 to contain habitats and species of national importance. NNRs can be owned by public, private, community or voluntary organisations but must be managed to conserve their important habitats and species, as well as providing opportunities for the public to enjoy and engage with nature. There are currently 43 NNRs in Scotland, which cover less than 1.5% of the land area of Scotland. Many of these reserves are IUCN Category II (national park) areas, such as Glen Affric, Rùm, Abernethy Forest and The Great Trossachs Forest. There are 19 NNRs with IUCN Category II status in Scotland. There are none with this status in England, Wales or NI. This is mainly due to Scotland’s natural habitats being more intact than in the rest of the UK.

NatureScot is responsible for declaring NNRs in Scotland, having taken advice from the NNR Partnership comprising representatives of the NNR managing and community and land-owning organisations. The majority of NNRs are directly managed by NatureScot; however, some are managed by, or in co-operation with other bodies such as Forestry and Land Scotland, the National Trust for Scotland and RSPB Scotland. Most NNRs in Scotland overlap Sites of Special Scientific Interest; many are also Special Areas of Conservation and/or Special Protection Areas.

=== National scenic areas ===
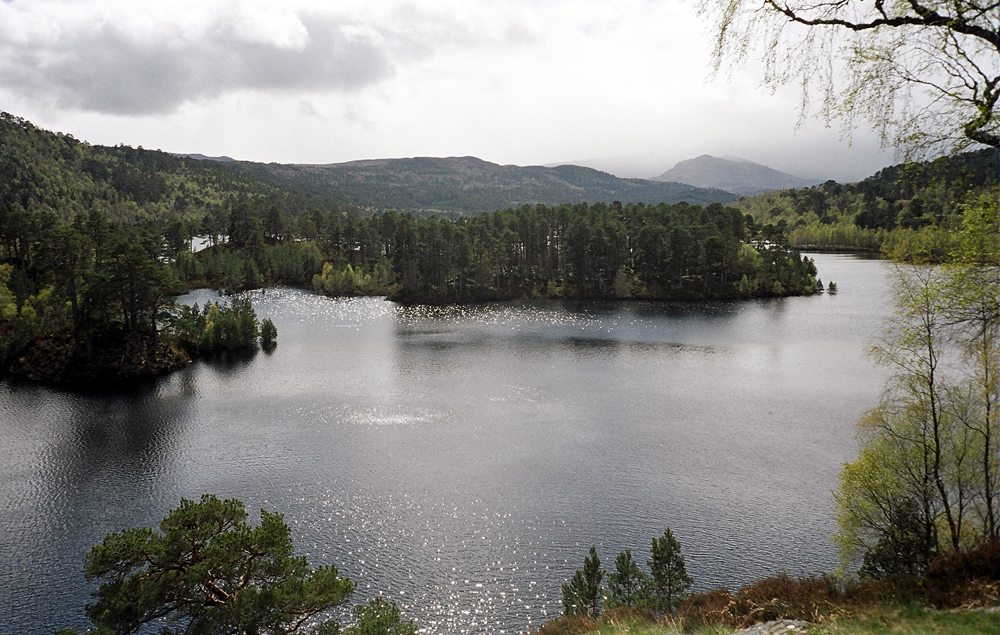
Glen Affric is designated as both a NSA and NNR.

There are 40 national scenic areas (NSAs) in Scotland, covering 13% of the land area of Scotland. The 40 NSAs were originally identified by the Countryside Commission for Scotland in 1978 as areas of "national scenic significance... of unsurpassed attractiveness which must be conserved as part of our national heritage".

=== Sites of Special Scientific Interest ===
There are 1,422 Sites of Special Scientific Interest (SSSI) in Scotland, in total covering around 10,110 square kilometres (3,900 sq mi), or about 12.6% of the country's total land area. They cover sites that are considered worthy of protection due to their flora, fauna, geology or geomorphology. Sites notified for their flora or fauna are known as Biological SSSIs, whilst those notified for geological or geomorphological interest are Earth Science SSSIs; sites may be notified under both categories. SSSIs are considered to form the basic building block of site-based nature conservation in Great Britain, and most other legal nature/earth science conservation designations, including national nature reserves, Ramsar sites, Special Protection Areas, and Special Areas of Conservation are based upon them. Most SSSIs are in private ownership, and NatureScot works with the owners and managers to ensure the special features are preserved. Each SSSI has a site management statement produced by NatureScot which describes these features and details the actions and restrictions required to conserve them.

The SSSI designation was originally introduced across Great Britain by the National Parks and Access to the Countryside Act 1949 (the similar Areas of Special Scientific Interest (ASSI) operates in Northern Ireland). SSSIs in Scotland now fall under the remit of the Scottish Parliament and Government, and are designated by NatureScot under the Nature Conservation (Scotland) Act 2004. The Register of Sites of Special Scientific Interest is held and maintained by the Registers of Scotland.

=== Marine protected areas ===
Scotland's network of Marine protected areas (MPAs) consists of more than 230 designated areas, covered by various designations including Special Areas of Conservation, Special Protection Areas and Sites of Special Scientific Interest. In order to strengthen the protection of marine areas seventeen Nature Conservation Marine Protected Areas (NCMPAs) were designated within Scotland's territorial waters (i.e. within 12 nautical miles (22 km)). A further thirteen protected areas are beyond the 12 mile limit and are therefore designated by the Joint Nature Conservation Committee rather than NatureScot.

== National designations for historic and cultural sites ==
=== Scheduled ancient monuments ===
A scheduled monument is a "nationally important" archaeological site or historic building, given protection against unauthorised change. The protection provided to scheduled monuments is given under the Ancient Monuments and Archaeological Areas Act 1979, which is a different law from that used for listed buildings (see below). According to the 1979 Act, a monument cannot be a structure which is occupied as a dwelling, used as a place of worship or protected under the Protection of Wrecks Act 1973. As a rule of thumb, a protected historic asset that is occupied would be designated as a listed building.

=== Listed buildings ===
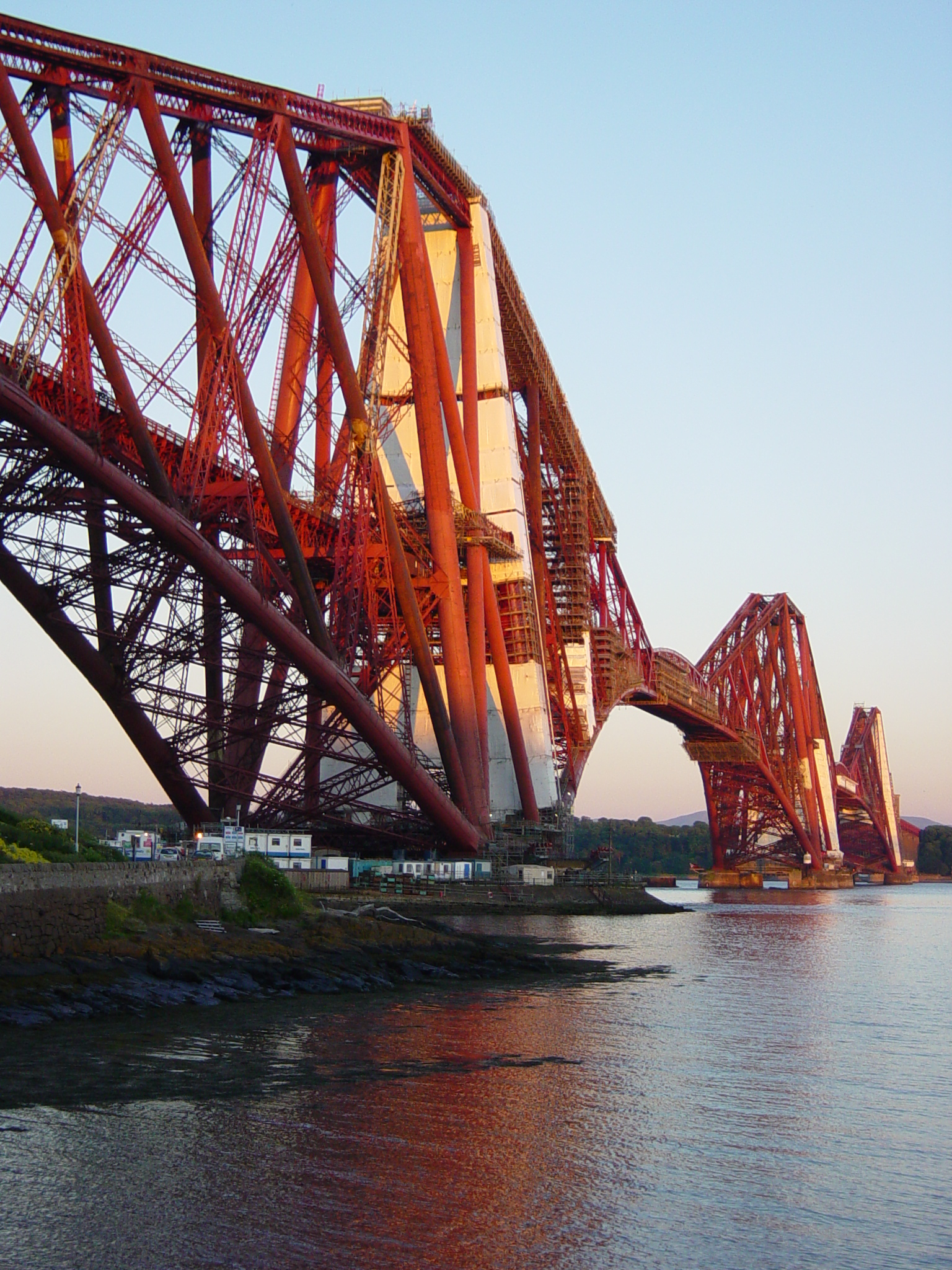
The Forth Bridge is designated as both a Category A listed building and a World Heritage Site.

A listed building or listed structure is one that has been placed on the statutory list maintained by Historic Environment Scotland. A listed building may not be demolished, extended, or altered without special permission from the local planning authority, which typically consults the relevant central government agency, particularly for significant alterations to the more notable listed buildings. The degree of protection depends on whether a building is classified as Category A, B or C, Category A denoting the highest level of protection.

There are about 47,400 listed buildings in Scotland. Of these, around 8 percent (some 3,800) are Category A, and 50 percent are Category B, with the rest listed at Category C.

=== Inventory of Gardens and Designed Landscapes in Scotland ===
The Inventory of Gardens and Designed Landscapes in Scotland is a listing of gardens and designed landscapes of national artistic and/or historical significance, in Scotland. The inventory was originally compiled in 1987, and now covers sites dating from the medieval period through to the 20th century. From 1991 the inventory, which is a continually evolving list, was maintained by Historic Scotland and Scottish Natural Heritage, and it is now updated by a dedicated team within Historic Environment Scotland. As of 2019 the inventory included over 300 sites across Scotland, ranging in size from one hectare to well over 1000 hectares.

=== Inventory of Historic Battlefields ===
The Inventory of Historic Battlefields in Scotland lists nationally significant battlefields. It was first published for consultation in December 2010 by Historic Scotland, and formally launched in May 2011. As of 2019 the inventory, which is now maintained by Historic Environment Scotland (successor body to Historic Scotland), lists 40 battlefields on the inventory, the most recent addition being the Battle of Sark which was listed in 2016.

== International designations ==
=== World Heritage Sites ===
World Heritage Sites are locations that have been included in the UNESCO World Heritage Programme list of sites of outstanding cultural or natural importance to the common heritage of humankind. Historic Environment Scotland is responsible for cultural sites, whilst the Scottish Government's Environment & Forestry Directorate is responsible for natural sites. As of 2025 there are 7 sites in the country.

=== Ramsar sites ===
Ramsar sites are internationally recognised wetland sites, protected under the terms of the Ramsar Convention on Wetlands, which was developed and adopted by participating nations at a meeting in Ramsar, Iran, on 2 February 1971. At the end of 2010, 160 states were contracting parties to the Convention, and the worldwide total of sites was 1,920. The United Kingdom was one of 18 original signatories to the Convention, and has since designated 168 Ramsar sites. 51 of these sites are within Scotland, including one site, the Upper Solway Flats and Marshes, which covers parts of both Scotland and England in the Solway Firth. The total area of all Ramsar sites in Scotland is approximately 313,500 hectares (775,000 acres). All of Scotland's Ramsar sites form part of the European Natura 2000 network as either Special Protection Areas or Special Areas of Conservation, and many sites are further protected as Sites of Special Scientific Interest.

=== Natura 2000 ===
Natura 2000 is a network of nature protection areas in the territory of the European Union. It is made up of Special Areas of Conservation (SACs) and Special Protection Areas (SPAs) designated under the Habitats Directive and Birds Directive respectively. The network includes both terrestrial and marine sites (Marine Protected Areas (MPAs)).

==== Special Areas of Conservation ====
A Special Area of Conservation (SAC) is defined in the European Union's Habitats Directive (92/43/EEC), also known as the Directive on the Conservation of Natural Habitats and of Wild Fauna and Flora. They are to protect the 220 habitats and approximately 1000 species listed in annex I and II of the directive which are considered to be of European interest following criteria given in the directive. They must be chosen from the Sites of Community Importance by the State Members and designated SAC by an act assuring the conservation measures of the natural habitat.

==== Special Protection Areas ====
A Special Protection Area (SPA) is a designation under the European Union Directive on the Conservation of Wild Birds. Under the Directive, Member States of the European Union (EU) have a duty to safeguard the habitats of migratory birds and certain particularly threatened birds.

== Local designations ==
=== Local nature reserves ===
Local nature reserves, of which there are 74, are designated by local authorities, and are usually close to towns and cities. The land is usually owned or leased by the local authority: where another person or body is the owner, the owner must formally agree to the designation.

=== Conservation areas ===
A conservation area is an area considered worthy of preservation or enhancement because of its special architectural or historic interest. In conservation areas, it is the protection of the quality and special interest of the neighbourhood or area as a whole that is intended, rather than specific buildings, which are protected by having listed status. Conservation areas are used to protect features such as groups of buildings, open spaces, street patterns, trees, and historic gardens. Scotland has around 600 conservation areas, which are controlled by local authorities.

=== Regional parks ===
Regional parks are defined to co-ordinate the management of areas of attractive countryside that are of importance for recreation due to their proximity to population centres. The parks have been defined and are managed by local authorities. Currently Scotland has three regional parks:

- Clyde Muirshiel Regional Park
- Lomond Hills Regional Park
- Pentland Hills Regional Park

== Non-statutory protected areas ==
In addition to statutory designations, many areas are protected by virtue of being owned by a conservation organisation. Such areas may also have legal protection, however there are many areas that are protected despite having no statutory designation. Examples of bodies owning land and property for conservation purposes in Scotland include:

- John Muir Trust
- National Trust for Scotland
- Scottish Wildlife Trust
- Royal Society for the Protection of Birds
- Woodland Trust

=== Forest parks ===
Forest parks are areas of forest managed by Forestry and Land Scotland (FLS) that are managed for multiple benefits, with an emphasis on recreation facilities for visitors. There are currently six forest parks in Scotland.

== See also ==
- List of biosphere reserves in Scotland
