= Coleophora concolorella =

Scientific classification
- Kingdom: Animalia
- Phylum: Arthropoda
- Clade: Pancrustacea
- Class: Insecta
- Order: Lepidoptera
- Family: Coleophoridae
- Genus: Coleophora
- Species: C. concolorella

Binomial name
- Coleophora concolorella Clemens, 1863

Synonyms
- Coleophora unicolorella Chambers, 1874

Species of moth

Coleophora concolorella is a moth of the family Coleophoridae. It is found in North America, including Ontario and Pennsylvania.

The larvae feed on the seeds of Juncus tenuis and Juncus compactus. They create a trivalved, tubular silken case.
