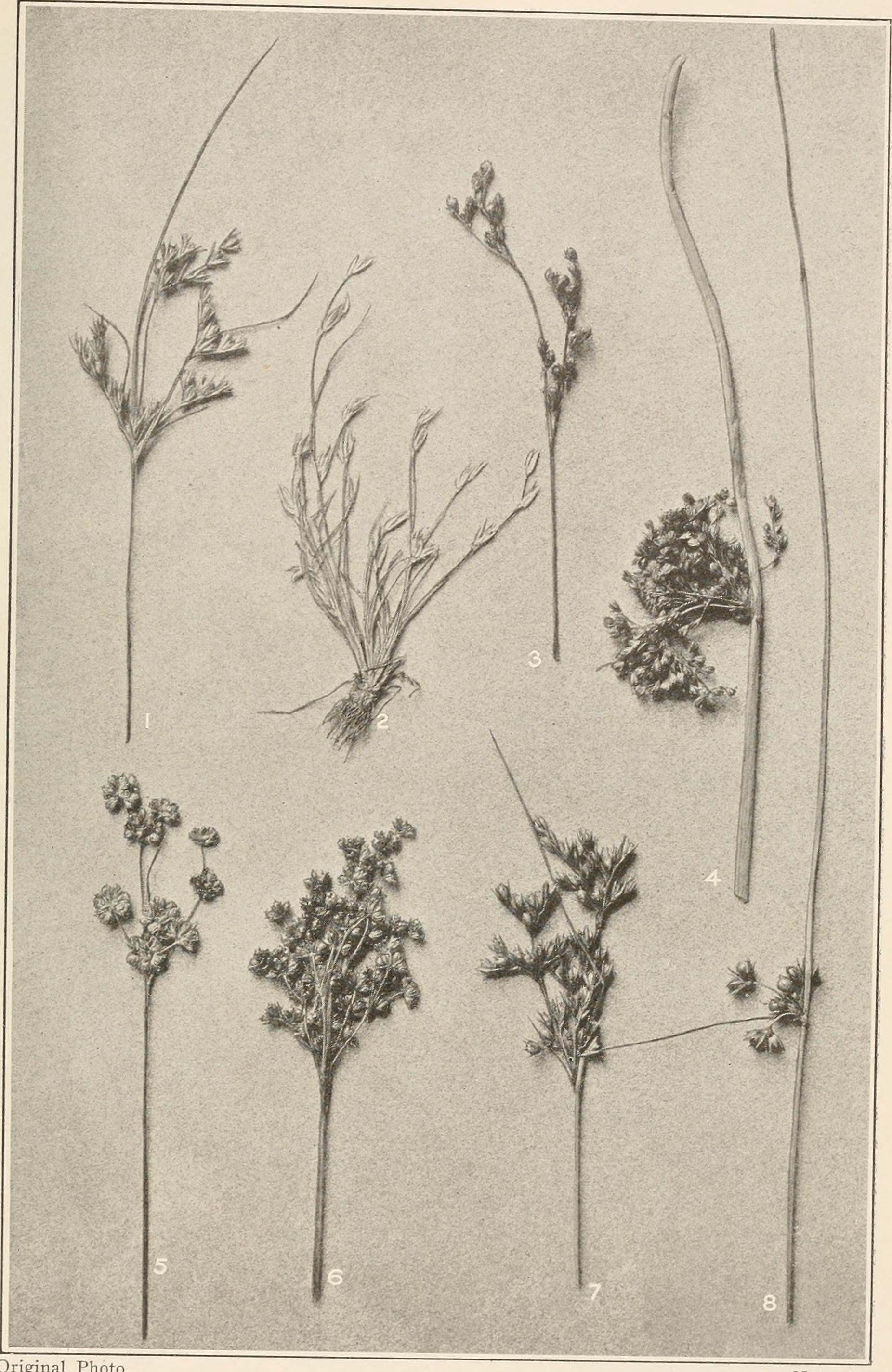

Scientific classification
- Kingdom: Plantae
- Clade: Embryophytes
- Clade: Tracheophytes
- Clade: Angiosperms
- Clade: Monocots
- Clade: Commelinids
- Order: Poales
- Family: Juncaceae
- Genus: Juncus
- Species: J. dichotomus

Binomial name
- Juncus dichotomus Elliott

Synonyms
- Juncus albicans Fernald; Juncus cognatus Kunth; Juncus platyphyllus (Wiegand) Fernald

= Juncus dichotomus =

Species of grass

Juncus dichotomus (commonly known as forked rush) is a monocot in the Juncaceae family of rushes. The plant is native to the Americas in temperate zones but has been introduced to other parts of the world. Juncus dichotomus often is found in very moist areas and where rainfall is a common occurrence. It is often most recognizable in the spring and summer months due to its conspicuous flowers and infructescence.

The species can be difficult to identify and is often confused with other Juncus species due to morphological similarity. Often Juncus dichotomus is overlooked because it is inconspicuous in the field. It is sometimes considered a weed.

== Description ==
Juncus dichotomus is a perennial herb, with stems (10–)15–40 cm tall and usually reddish at the base. Its rhizomes are densely branched to short-creeping. It has 2–3 basal or sub-basal leaves which are nearly terete, channeled or flat, 10–25(–40) cm long and about 0.7 mm wide; its auricles are very short, 0.2–0.5 mm in length, with a scarious to leathery texture and white to faint purple color. Its inflorescences are terminal with (5–)10–85(–100) flowers, which are often congested but more rarely somewhat loose. Flowers are bracteoles with green tepals. Capsules are tan to brown, and are ellipsoid to wide in shape. Seeds are brownish to amber, ellipsoid to lunate in shape, about 0.3–0.4 mm in size.

J. dichotomus is a graminoid, i.e., a grass-like plant. It belongs to the monocot group in which it is a member of a Juncaceae family, otherwise known as the rushes. This species of rush is not tall and lacks many distinctive features, making it especially hard to identify by non-specialists. In North America, Juncus dichotomus is most frequently observed in July through August. It can be found in dry sites, but it thrives best in damp soils, such as roadside ditches where runoff is frequent.

== Habitat and distribution ==
Juncus dichotomus is native and distributed widely in the Americas in temperate zones but has been reported as introduced in other temperate climate zones around the world. The species is common throughout the southeastern United States, and in some northeastern regions.

Juncus dichotomus is a more specialized species, found in temporarily wet habitats: riverbanks, pond margins, depressions in heaths, sometimes near rice fields. It usually grows in sandy soils, or any habitat that holds sufficient groundwater with stable temperate temperatures.

Flowering and fruiting occur in late spring–summer in ditches, shores, clearings, and other typically open areas, usually in sandy, well-drained (but frequently wet) soil.

== Uses ==
The uses for Juncus dichotomus are limited. Since the plant is often found near water sources, it can play a role in preventing erosion.

== Management ==
It is clear that Juncus dichotomus has increased its range substantially due to human aided dispersal. However, the biogeographic history of the species is somewhat unclear due in part to its similarities with other graminoid species.

Juncus dichotomus, a native of the Americas, is also now being reported as invasive in Europe. Juncus dichotomous has been confused with Juncus tenuis, a related plant widespread in Europe which may have contributed to its spread there. Management of this species as an invasive in Europe is unclear, although water regime is important and may be manipulated to control the plant, in addition to herbicides.

Systemic rusts and smuts have a major effect on individual plants and populations, as these fungi affect growth and survival; diseased plants may become distorted, stunted, or elongated, although the results are variable. More work on the life history of J. dichotomus is required to better understand how it responds to disease and other abiotic factors.
