= James Smith (Scottish botanist) =

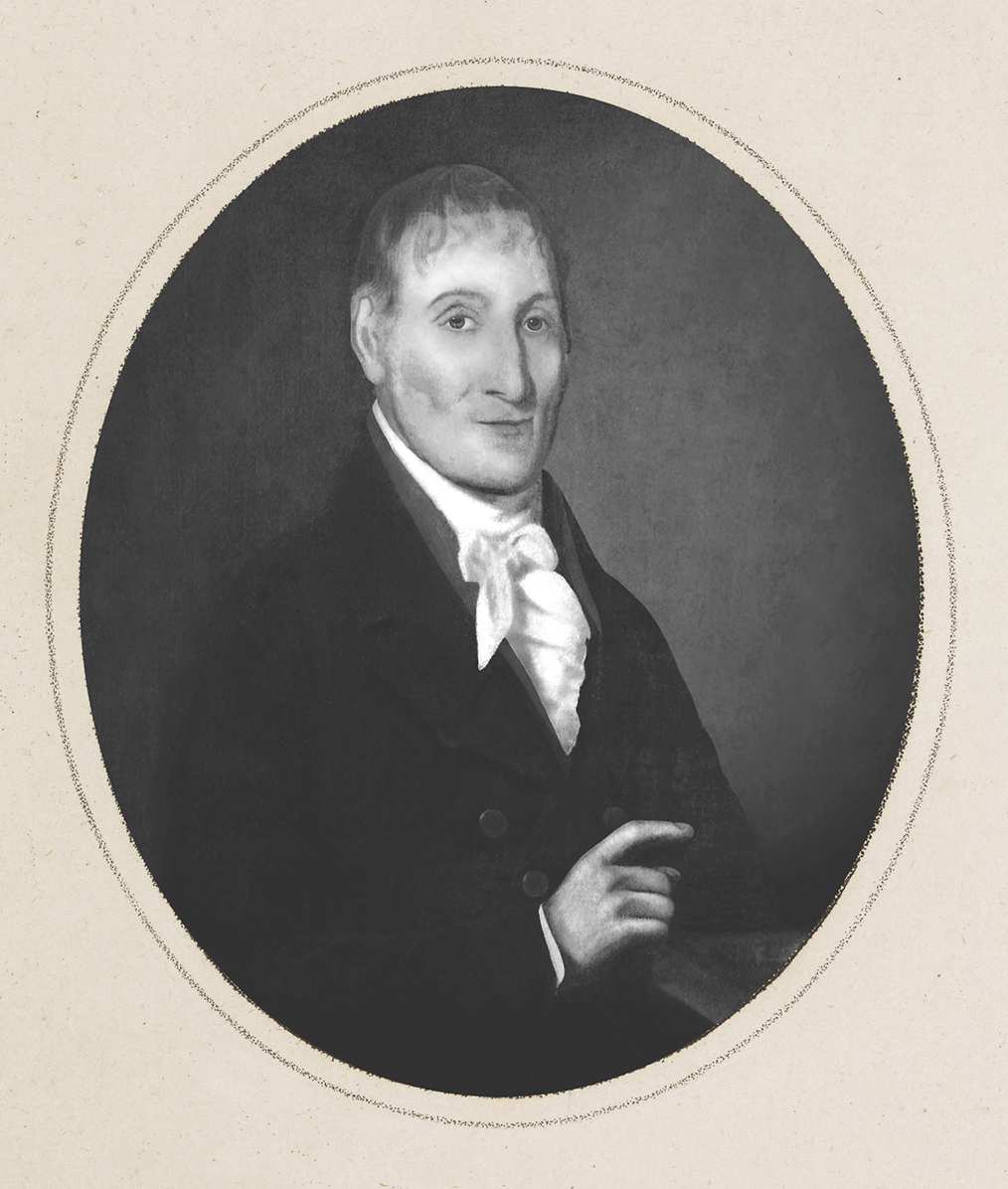
Portrait of James Smith

James Smith (1760 – 1 January 1848) was a Scottish botanist and nurseryman. He founded the Monkwood Botanic Garden in Maybole Parish which included several thousand species of exotic and native British plants. A regular consultant of his English contemporaries, he is credited with the discovery of Primula scotica, Salix caprea pendula and several other species of plants native to Scotland. Owing to this particular interest in the flora of Scotland, Smith has been described as the "father of Scottish botany."

== Biography ==
Smith was born in 1760 in Ochiltree, Scotland. In his earlier years, he had been a student of Joseph Banks, and worked in the gardens of Stowe House and Syon House. He later became the superintendent of the London Botanic Garden of William Curtis. In 1784, Smith returned to Scotland with a variety of plants donated by Curtis and others to establish what his obituary in The Ayr Advertiser referred to as the "first private collection [of plants] in Scotland" classified using the Linnaean system.

Upon his return, Smith initially made use of a garden that was later absorbed into the burying ground of the Auld Kirk of Ayr, before establishing a nursery at his home on the Monkwood estate near Minishant in Maybole Parish. This eventually became the Monkwood Botanic Garden which, according to John Loudon’s Encyclopaedia of Gardening, included over thirty-five hundred different species of both "exotic and indigenous varieties" by 1825. It was at Monkwood where Smith employed and mentored his future son-in-law, the botanist John Goldie, for whom Dyopteris goldieana is named. Passing through Monkwood on one occasion, the poet Hew Ainslie wrote in his A Pilgrimage in the Land of Burns (1820) that Smith's garden was "paradisiacal", where plants "of all nations were seated most brotherly together, drinking of the same dews, and dancing to the piping of the same breeze".

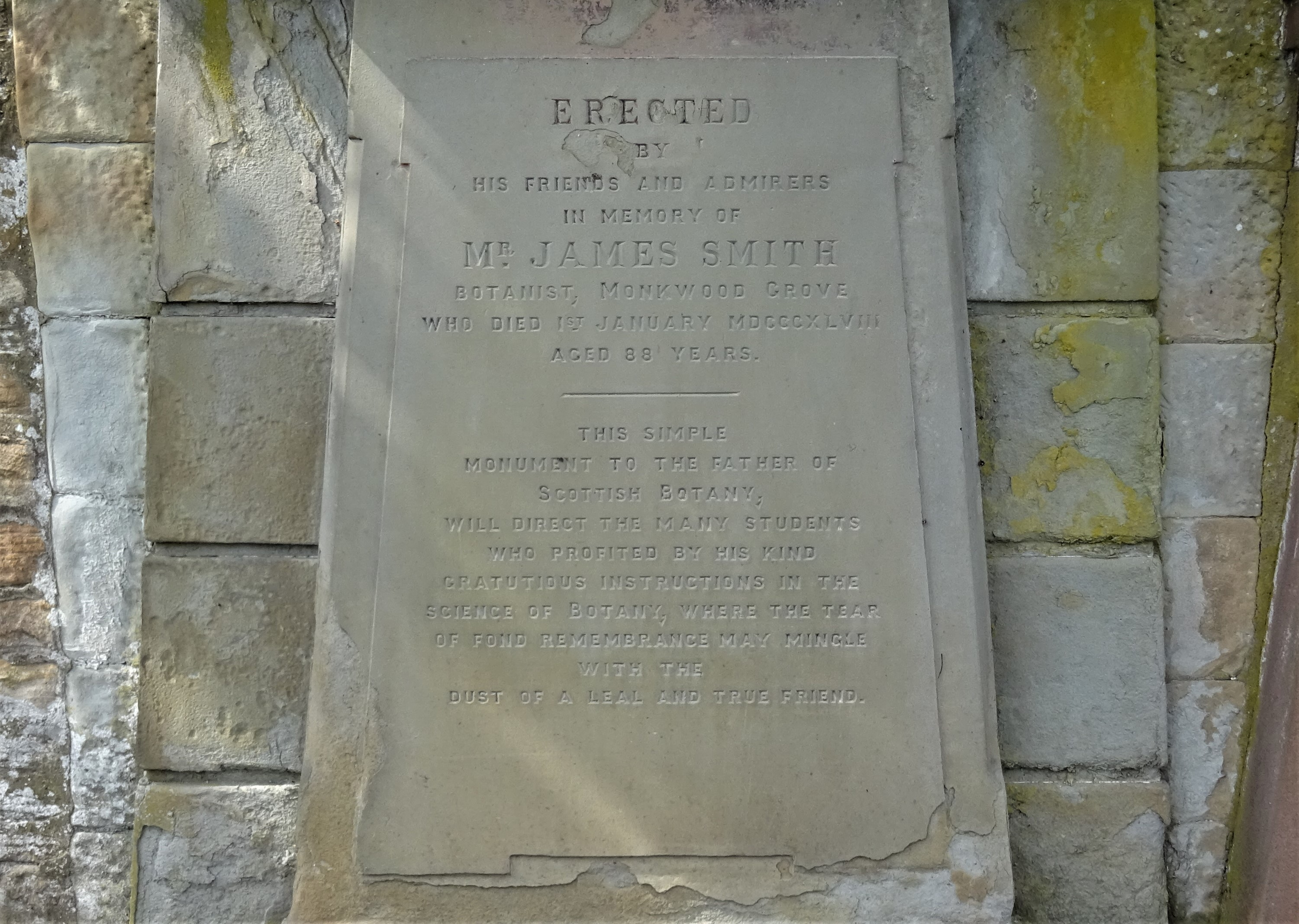
Smith's grave at the Auld Kirkyard in Ayr

Owing to his botanical knowledge and extensive collection of plants, Smith was regularly consulted by such contemporary English botanists as William Jackson Hooker and James Edward Smith who included his information on botanical subjects in their works. As mentioned in Hooker's Flora Scotica (1821), Smith is credited with the discovery of Primula scotica, Veronica hirsuta and the Kilmarnock Weeping Willow (Salix caprea pendula).

Smith died on 1 January 1848, aged 84. His gravestone in the Ayr Auld Kirkyard (where Smith had his first garden) describes him as the "father of Scottish botany," a title derived from his particular interest in the flora of Scotland. By the end of the nineteenth century, both the house and garden at Monkwood had gone, however many of Smith's rare plants remain on the grounds.
