= Glen Birnam =

Painting by John Everett Millais

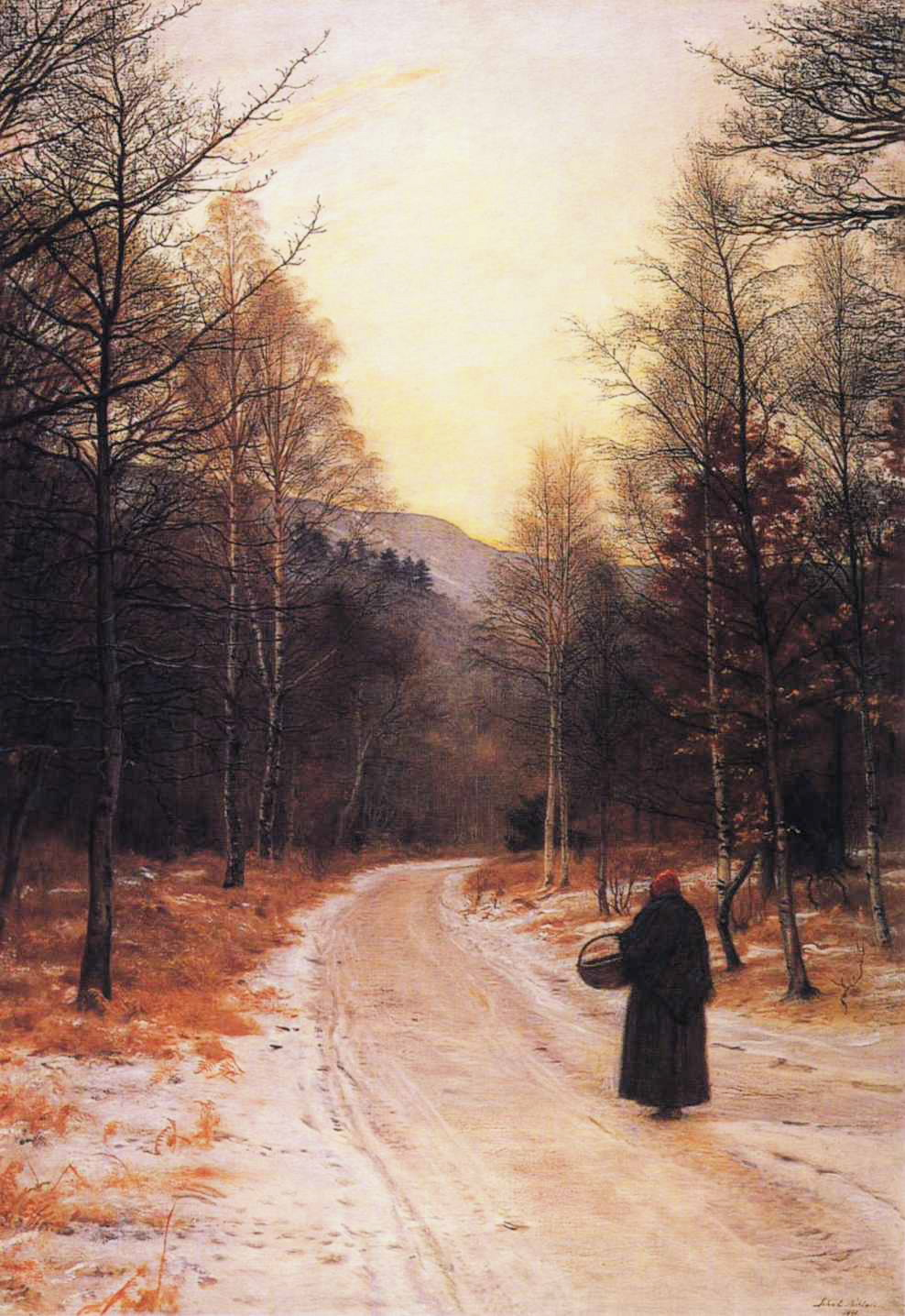
- Artist: John Everett Millais
- Year: 1891
- Type: Oil on canvas, landscape painting
- Dimensions: 145.2 cm × 101.1 cm (57.2 in × 39.8 in)
- Location: Manchester Art Gallery, Manchester

Glen Birnam is an 1891 landscape painting by the British artist John Everett Millais. It depicts a woman walking alone along a snow-covered track through the woods near the village of Birnam in Perthshire. Millais often visited the area and produced this landscape late in his career. The painting is now in the Manchester Art Gallery, having been acquired in 1908.

== See also ==
- List of paintings by John Everett Millais

== Bibliography ==
- Barlow, Paul. Time Present and Time Past: The Art of John Everett Millais. Routledge, 2017.
- Lewington, Ann. Birch. Reaktion Books, 2018.
- Riding, Christine. John Everett Millais. Harry N. Abrams, 2006.
- Treuherz, Julian. Pre-Raphaelite Paintings from the Manchester City Art Gallery. Lund Humphries, 1980.
