= Birnam, Perth and Kinross =

Coordinates: 56.557°N 3.576°W

Birnam: Scottish Gaelic: Braonan
- Location within Perth and Kinross
- OS grid reference: NO032417
- Council area: Perth and Kinross
- Lieutenancy area: Perth and Kinross
- Country: Scotland
- Sovereign state: United Kingdom
- Post town: DUNKELD
- Postcode district: PH8
- Dialling code: 01350
- Police: Scotland
- Fire: Scottish
- Ambulance: Scottish
- UK Parliament: Angus and Perthshire Glens
- Scottish Parliament: Perthshire North; Mid Scotland and Fife

Birnam (Scottish Gaelic: Braonan) is a village in Perth and Kinross, Scotland. It is located 12 miles (19 km) north of Perth on the A9 road, the main tourist route through Perthshire, in an area of Scotland marketed as Big Tree Country. The village originated from the Victorian era with the coming of the railway in 1856, although the place and name is well known because William Shakespeare mentioned Birnam Wood in Macbeth:

MACBETH: Till Birnam wood remove to Dunsinane/ I cannot taint with fear.

— Shakespeare, Macbeth, Act 5, scene 3.

Prior to the construction of the railway, the only substantial building on the site of the present village was the church of Little Dunkeld parish, which still stands in its ancient position within a graveyard within the village. Dunkeld, to whose monastery Kenneth MacAlpin, the first King of Scotland, moved the bones of St. Columba around the middle of the ninth century, and which is notable for its cathedral, lies on the opposite bank of the river.

== Governance ==
Birnam is in the Perth and Kinross council area, and in the Community Council area of Dunkeld and Birnam, which also includes Amulree, Butterstone, Dalguise, Kindallachan, Loch Ordie, and Strathbraan.

It is in the Perthshire North constituency for the Scottish Parliament where as of 2024 has been represented since 2011 by John Swinney for the SNP. It is in the Angus and Perthshire Glens constituency for the UK Parliament, where as of 2024 it is represented by Dave Doogan for the SNP.

== Transport ==
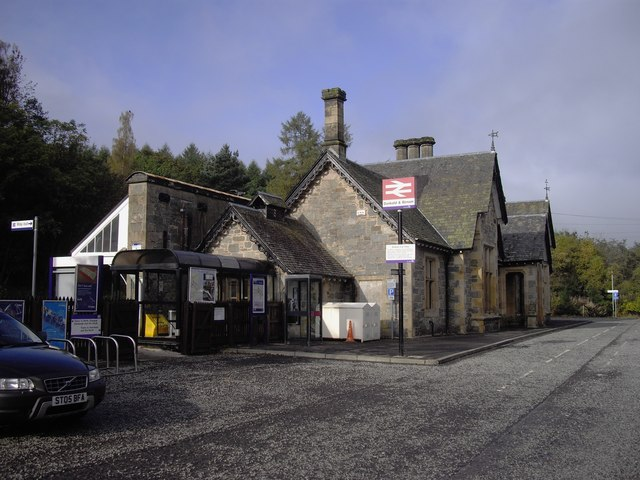
Dunkeld and Birnam Railway Station

In 1977, Birnam, along with neighbouring Dunkeld and Little Dunkeld, was bypassed by A9. The village is now approximately one hour from Glasgow and Edinburgh, and two hours from Inverness, by car. There are regular bus and coach services to Birnam and Dunkeld along the A9, with long-distance coaches operated by Scottish Citylink. There is access by rail at Dunkeld & Birnam railway station on the Highland Main Line route between Perth and Inverness. Most services on the route extend to either Edinburgh Waverley or Glasgow Queen Street; on Sundays only a southbound train operated by the East Coast Main Line operator extends to London King's Cross via Edinburgh, although there is no corresponding northbound service from London. A daily (except Saturday) London service is offered by the overnight Caledonian Sleeper trains to and from London Euston.

== Notable people ==
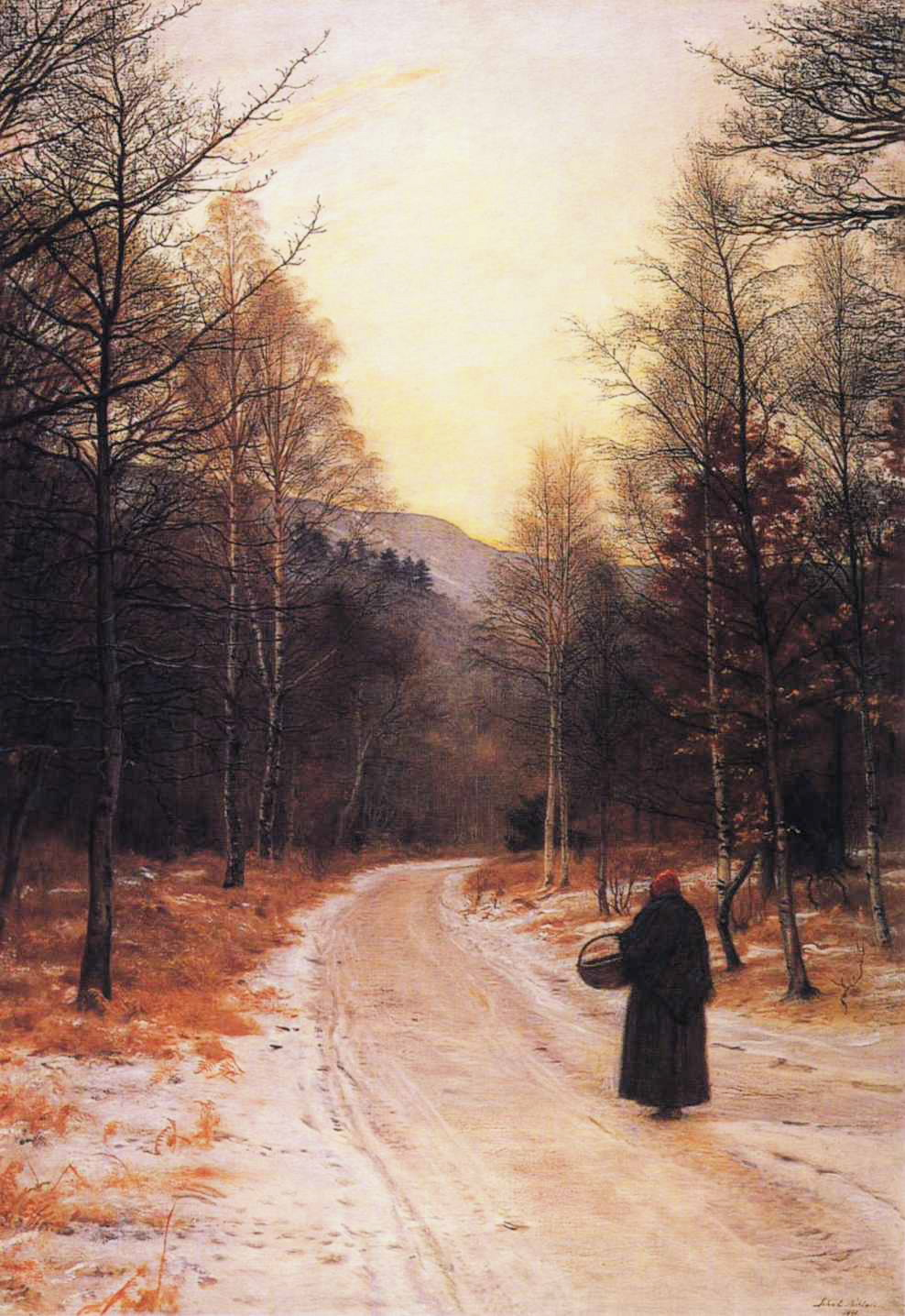
Glen Birnam by John Everett Millais, 1890

John Everett Millais, who painted many local landscapes, and Beatrix Potter, with her family, often visited Birnam. Potter drafted her first book, The Tale of Peter Rabbit, at Eastwood House whilst writing a story and picture letter to child friend Noel Moore on 4 September 1893. There is an exhibition and garden dedicated to Potter and her characters in Birnam.

Dr George Smyttan FRSE HEIC (1789-1863) was born and raised in Dunkeld, and retained links to Birnam all his life.

== Attractions ==
There is an ancient tree, the Birnam Oak, standing a few hundred metres from the centre of Birnam on Murthly Estate. Traditionally, it was known as "The Hangman's Tree". The Birnam Oak is believed to be the only remaining tree from the Birnam Wood of Macbeth.

In addition to The Beatrix Potter Exhibition and Garden, Birnam also has a community-run arts and performance centre and library, Birnam Arts and Conference Centre.

The Birnam Highland Games is the location of the World Haggis Eating Championships.

== Gallery ==
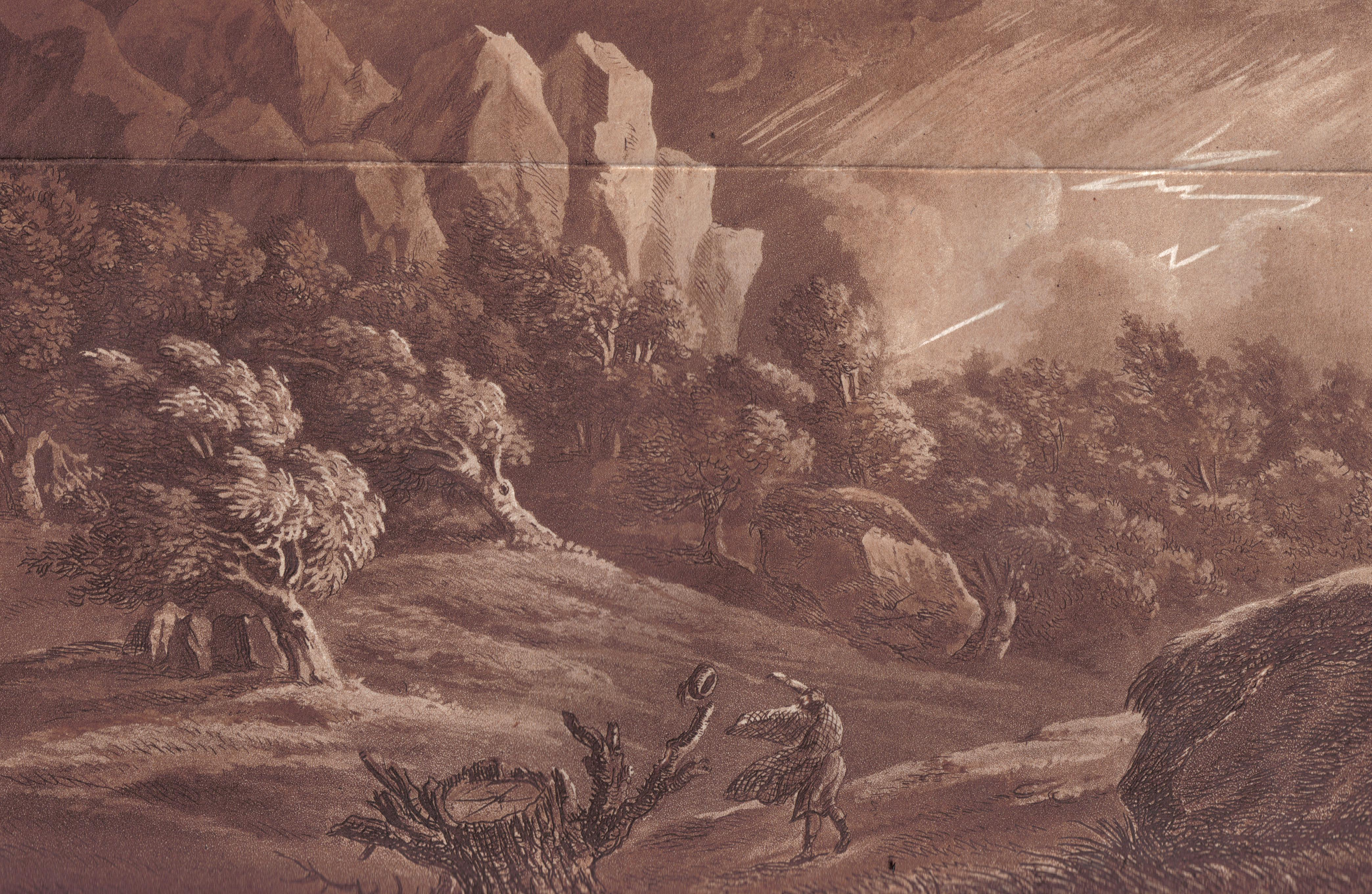
Birnam Wood in 1800

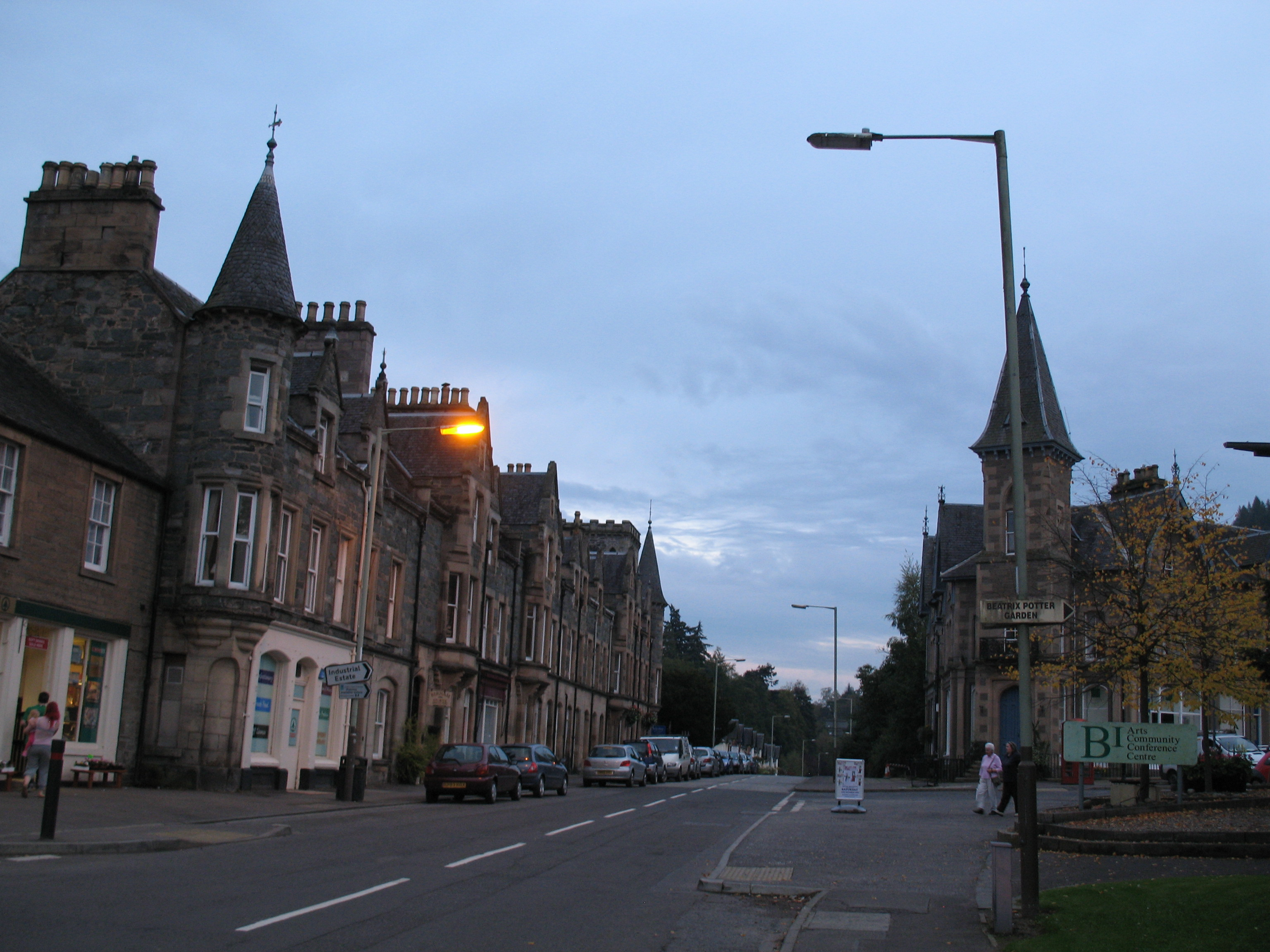
Main Street, Birnam

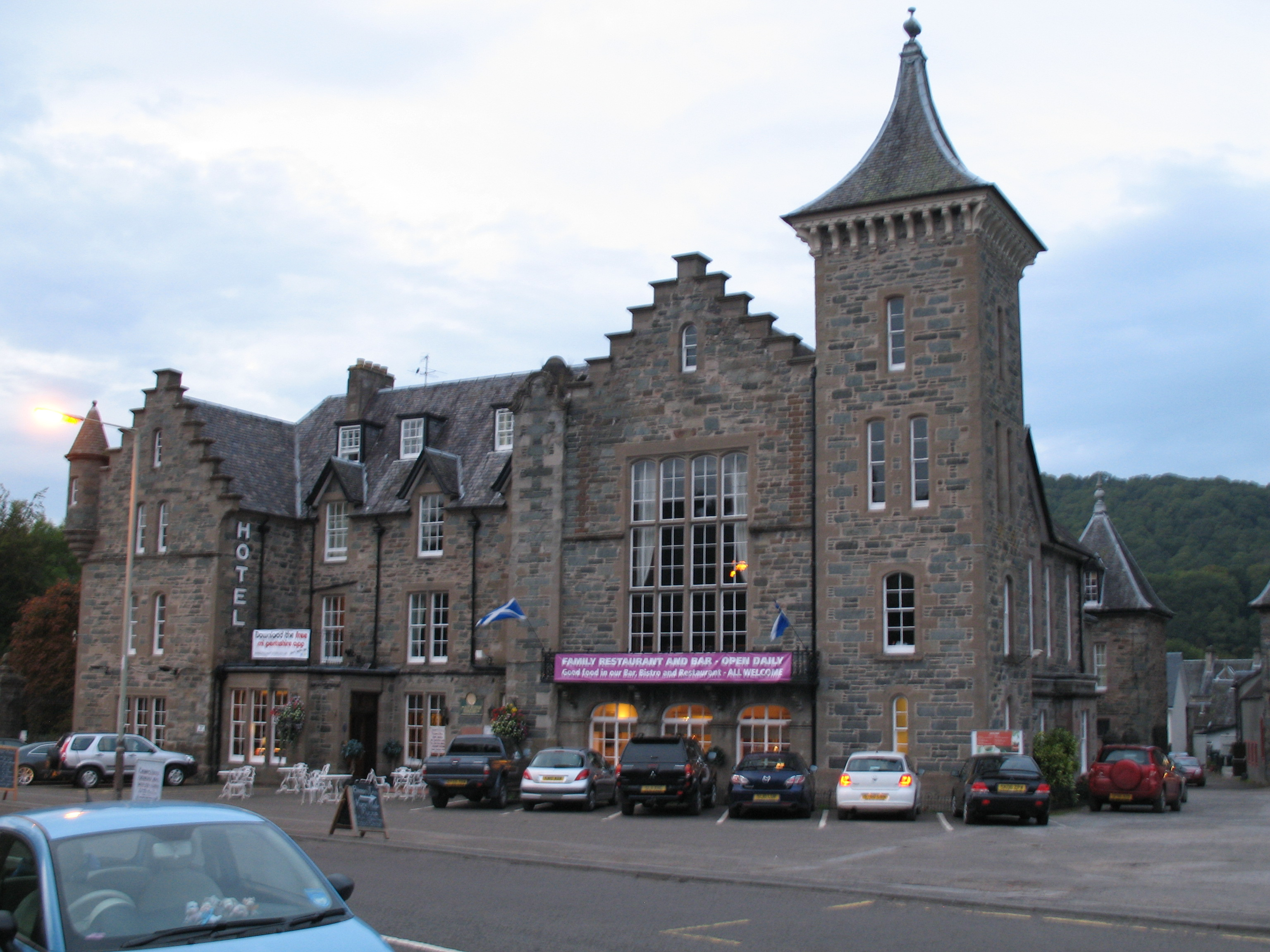
The Birnam Hotel

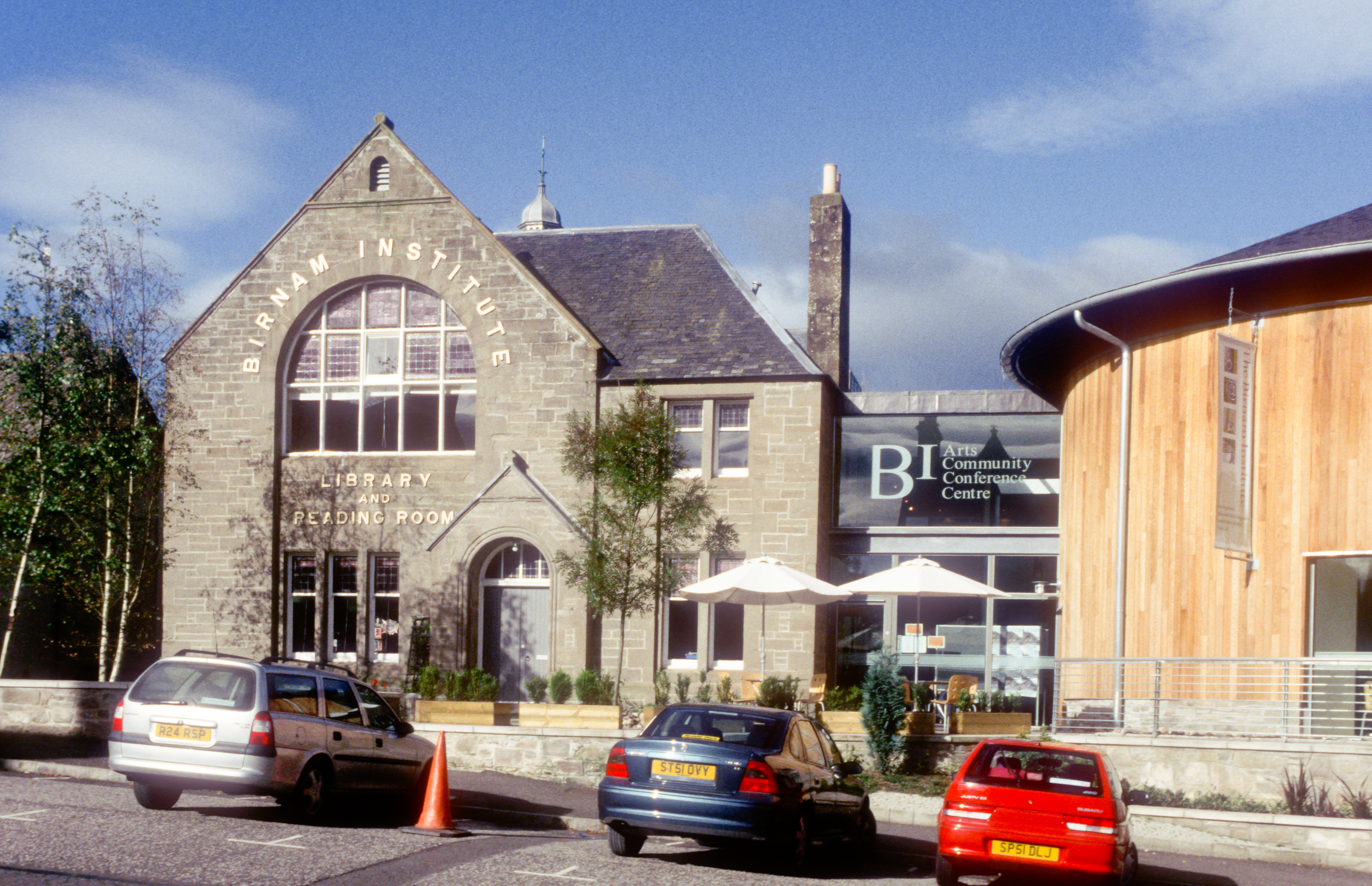
The Birnam Arts and Conference Centre

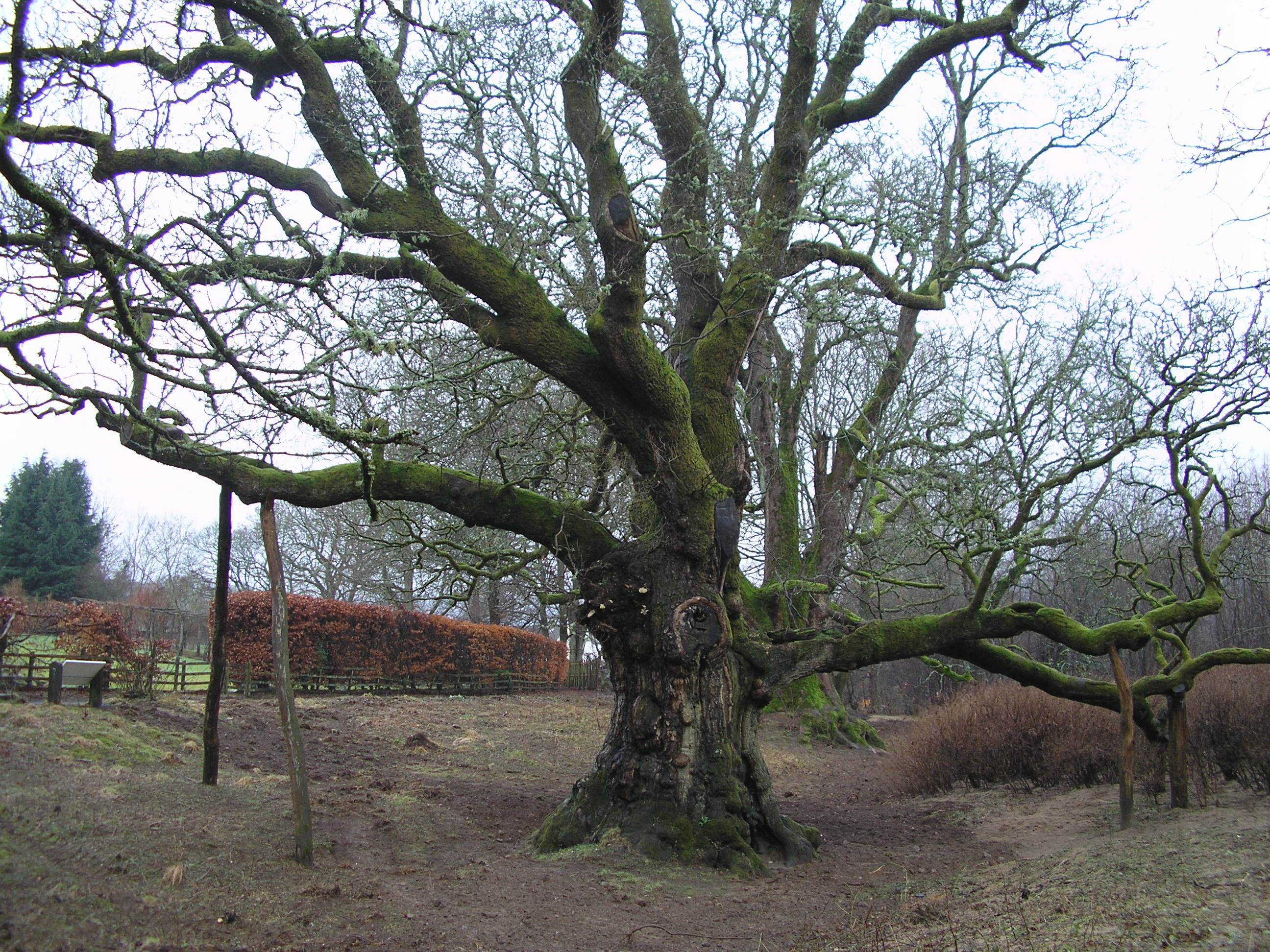
The Birnam Oak
