= Loch Ordie =

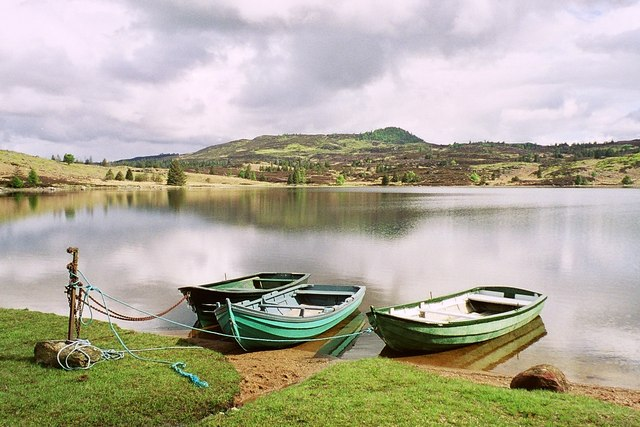
- Early morning at Loch Ordie.

- Location within Perth and Kinross
- Location: NO033500
- Coordinates: 56.632300°N 3.5771°W
- Type: freshwater loch
- Max. length: 1.06 km (0.66 mi)
- Max. width: 0.8 km (0.50 mi)
- Surface area: 43.7 ha (108 acres)
- Average depth: 26.3 ft (8.0 m)
- Max. depth: 69 ft (21 m)
- Water volume: 133,110,000 ft^{3} (3,769,000 m^{3})
- Shore length^{1}: 3 km (1.9 mi)
- Surface elevation: 288 m (945 ft)
- Max. temperature: 57.6 °F (14.2 °C)
- Min. temperature: 45.4 °F (7.4 °C)
- Islands: 0
- ^{1} Shore length is not a well-defined measure.

Loch Ordie is a classic freshwater hill loch east of the River Tay, and surrounded by wooded hills, in the Forest of Clunie.

== Fly Fishing ==
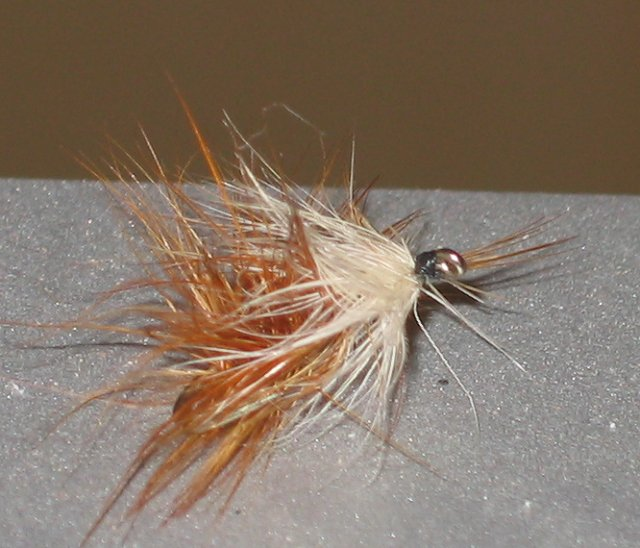
No mention of Loch Ordie would be complete without the legendary trout fly named after the loch. A simple and unusual design, just hackles

Loch Ordie gives its name to one of the Scotland most useful and famous trout flies, Loch Ordie. The fly is either fished as a dapping fly or on the bob of a three wet fly cash.

== Royal visit ==
On 9 October 1865, Queen Victoria with her daughter Princess Helena accompanied by the Marchioness of Ely, travelled to the farm at Pitearmich in Strathardle and were met by General Charles Grey with their ponies, and also by the Duchess of Atholl and Miss MacGregor. Mounting their ponies, the group rode across the hill along a sheep track, in a driving rain, with a thick mist covering the hills. When they reached the party at Atholl Estate, the whole group rode through the Larch woods for two and a half hours to reach Loch Ordie. While there, they royal party visited a Loch Ordie Lodge, and partook in tea and whisky.
