= Hygrohypnum styriacum =

Snow brook-moss

Scientific classification
- Kingdom: Plantae
- Division: Bryophyta
- Class: Bryopsida
- Subclass: Bryidae
- Order: Hypnales
- Family: Amblystegiaceae
- Genus: Hygrohypnum
- Species: H. styriacum

Binomial name
- Hygrohypnum styriacum (Limpr.) Broth.

Species of moss

Hygrohypnum styriacum, commonly known as snow brook-moss or hygrohypnum moss is a species of moss found in the Northern Hemisphere.

It is present in Greenland Iceland, Norway, Poland, Slovakia, Sweden, Scotland and Spain (Andalusia, Sierra Nevada). The Scottish population is restricted to Coire an t-Sneachda in the Cairngorm mountains where it was first discovered in 1989.

The species occupies Arctic and alpine habitats. It is classified as "Imperiled" in British Columbia and in Britain is considered to be "Critically Endangered".
