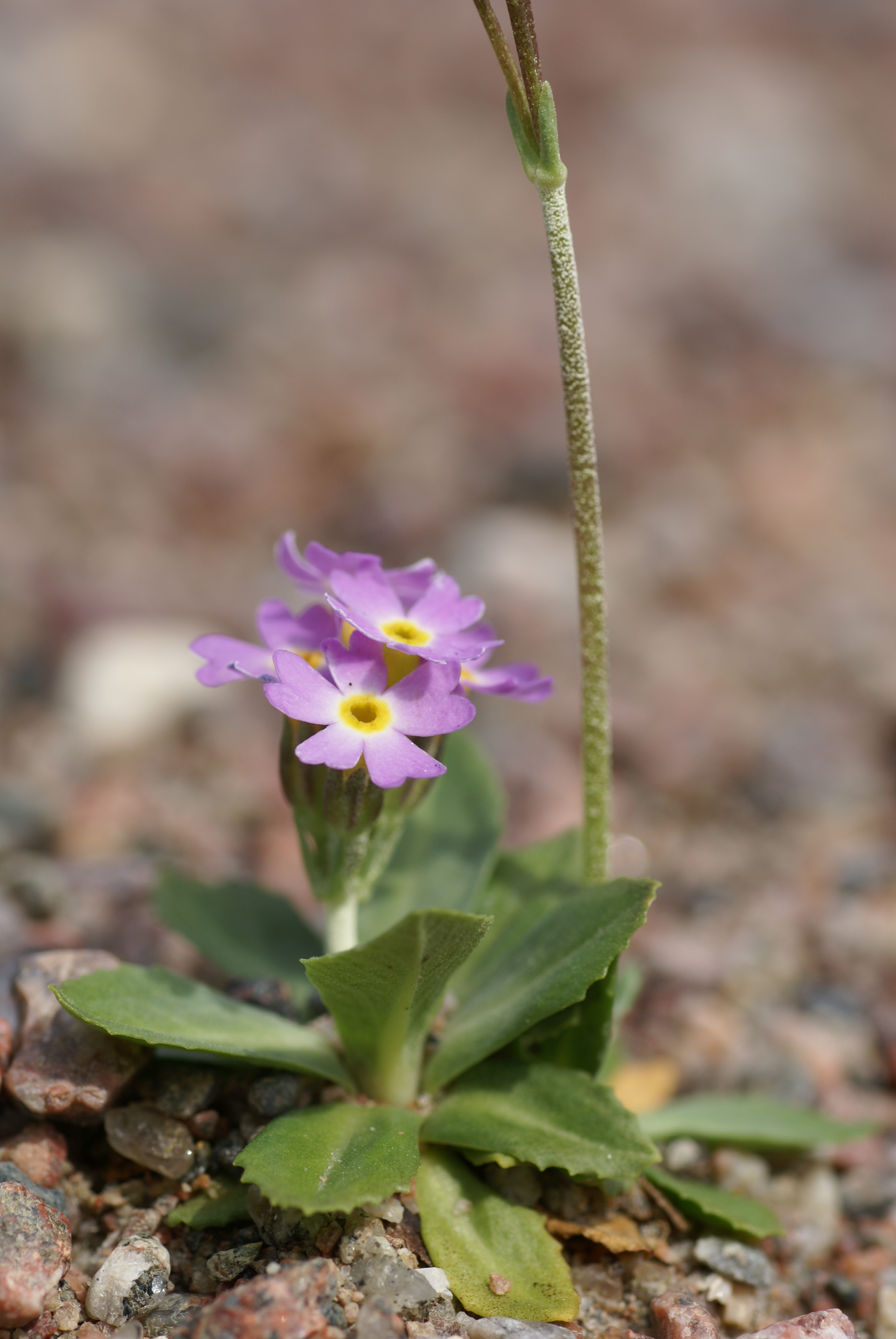

Conservation status
- Least Concern (IUCN 3.1)

Scientific classification
- Kingdom: Plantae
- Clade: Tracheophytes
- Clade: Angiosperms
- Clade: Eudicots
- Clade: Asterids
- Order: Ericales
- Family: Primulaceae
- Genus: Primula
- Species: P. stricta

Binomial name
- Primula stricta Hornem.

Synonyms
- Aleuritia stricta (Hornem.) Soják; Androsace stricta Hartm. ex Duby; Primula hornemanniana Lehm.; Primula stricta var. glabrescens F.Nyl. ex Nyl. & Saell.

= Primula stricta =

Species of flowering plant

Primula stricta, also known as the strict primrose, is a species of flowering plant in the family Primulaceae.

== Description ==
Primula stricta is a perennial plant growing from 5–20 cm (2.0–7.9 in) tall. The species has basal rosette of leaves, which possess glandular hairs on their underside. Flowers stand on straight leafless stems, usually there are five flowers per stem. The petals are pink, however yellow and white is also present towards the centre of the flower.

== Distribution ==
The native range of P. stricta is confined to the northern hemisphere where it possesses a Circumboreal distribution. It is a native to the countries of Finland, Greenland, Iceland, Norway, Sweden, Siberia (Western) and Russia (Northern European). It can also be found throughout many of the following Canadian provinces: Labrador, Manitoba, Newfoundland, Northwest Territories, Ontario, Nunavut, and Québec.

== Habitat ==
Primula stricta inhabits coastal and exposed habitats such as rocky outcrops, shingle shores, saltmarshes, sand dunes and beach ridges. It can also be found less commonly growing near to bodies of freshwater such as rivers, lakes and streams in poor quality soils. This species is found at altitudes ranging from 0 - 300m above sea level.
