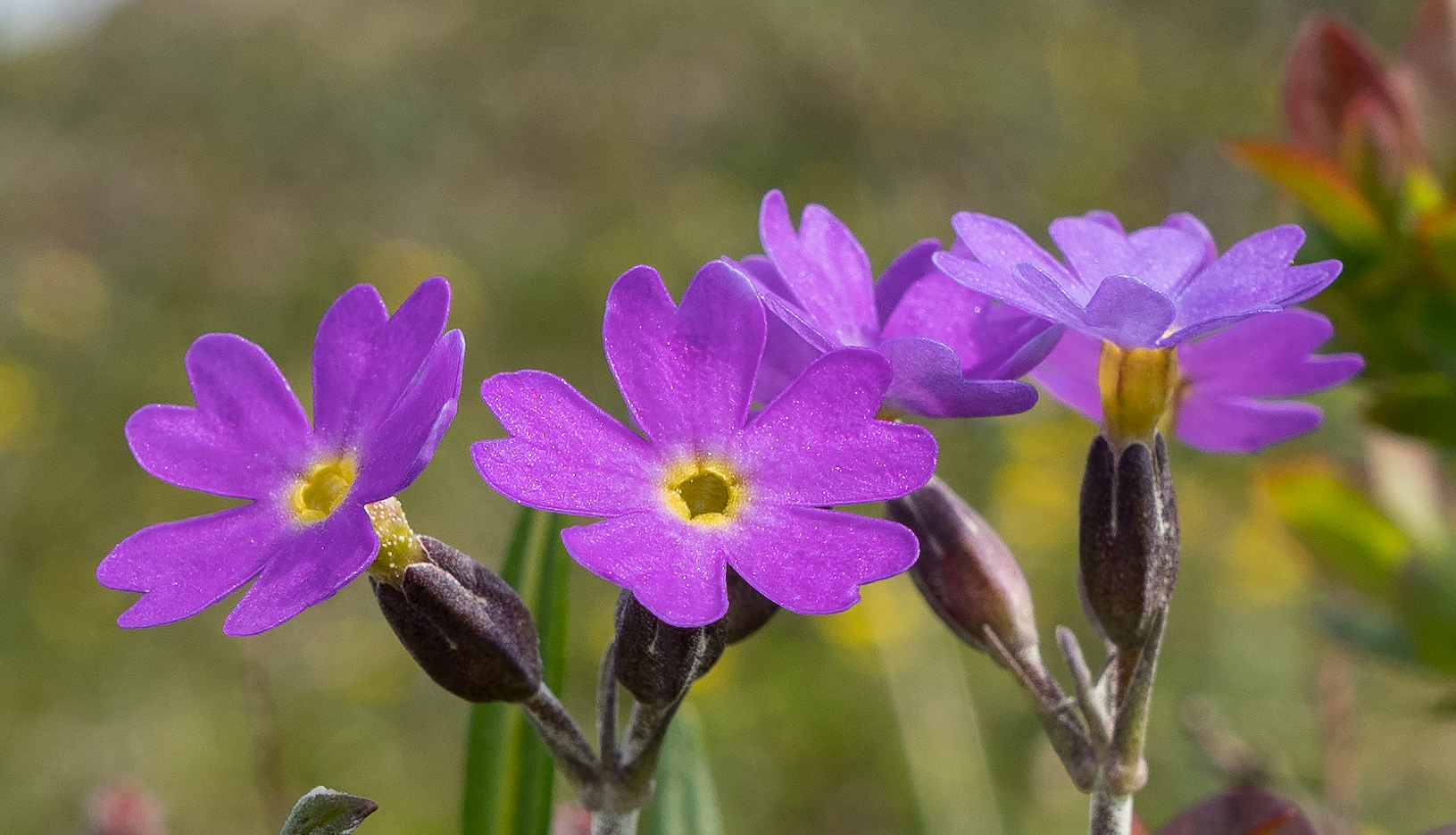

Conservation status
- Near Threatened (IUCN 3.1)

Scientific classification
- Kingdom: Plantae
- Clade: Tracheophytes
- Clade: Angiosperms
- Clade: Eudicots
- Clade: Asterids
- Order: Ericales
- Family: Primulaceae
- Genus: Primula
- Species: P. scandinavica

Binomial name
- Primula scandinavica Bruun
- The range of Primula scandinavica

Synonyms
- Aleuritia scandinavica (Bruun) Soják

= Primula scandinavica =

Species of flowering plant

Primula scandinavica is a species of flowering plant in the family Primulaceae.

== Description ==
Primula scandinavica is a perennial plant, which possesses a basal rosette of leaves. The leaves are around 2–4 cm long, narrow at the base, yet broad and rounded at the tip. Flowers are based on the top of stalks ranging from 4–10 cm tall. Petals are pink in colour, with the eye of the flower being yellow.

== Distribution ==
The native range of P. scandinavica is confined to Scandinavia where it endemic to both Norway and Sweden.

== Habitat ==
Primula scandinavica grows on calcareous rocks. It can be found in coastal habitats such as rocky outcrops, stony shores and cliffs.

It also grows in mountainous and alpine habitats, however populations decline where grazing livestock isn't present.

== Image gallery ==
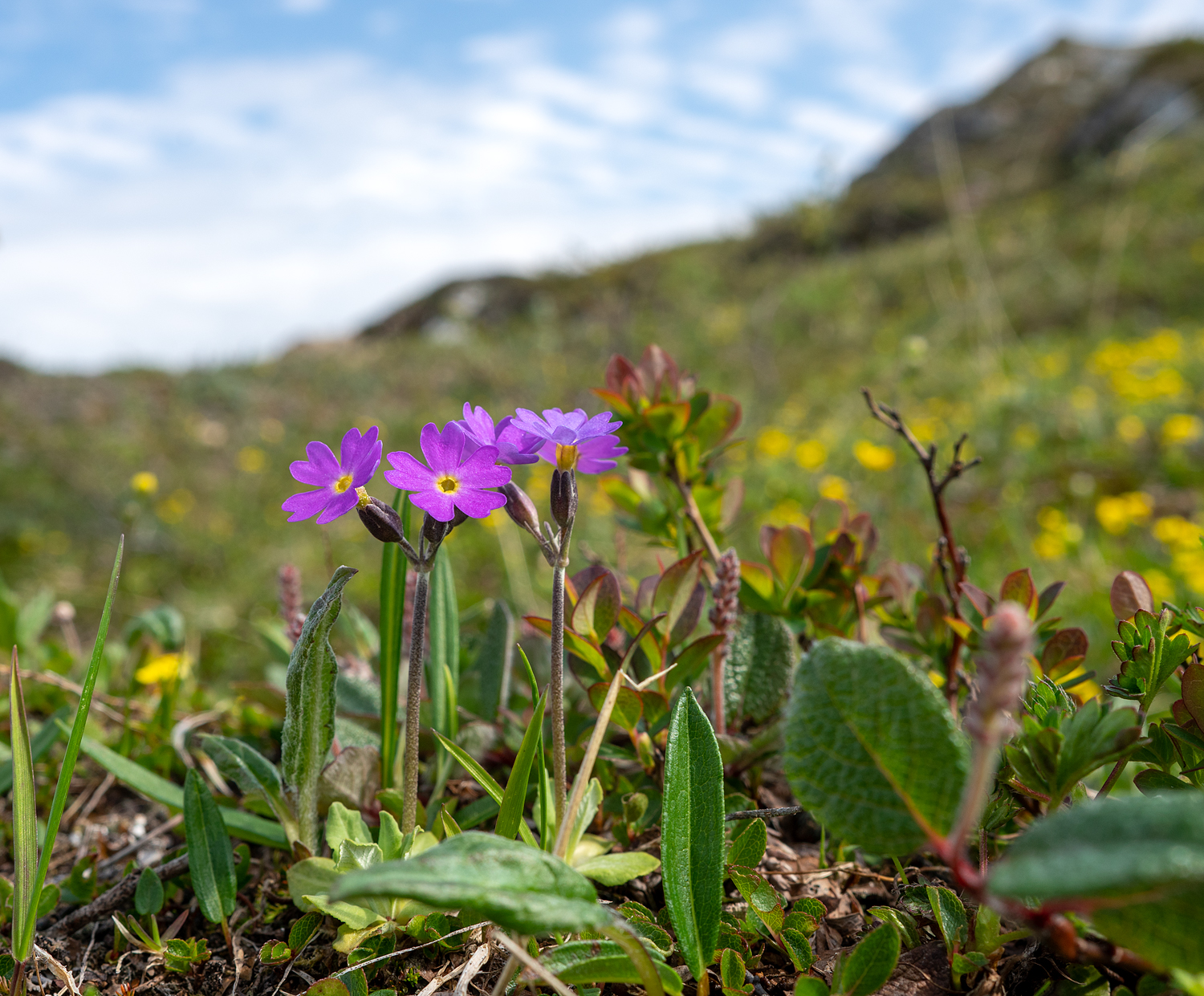
P. scandinavica growing in Padjelanta National Park

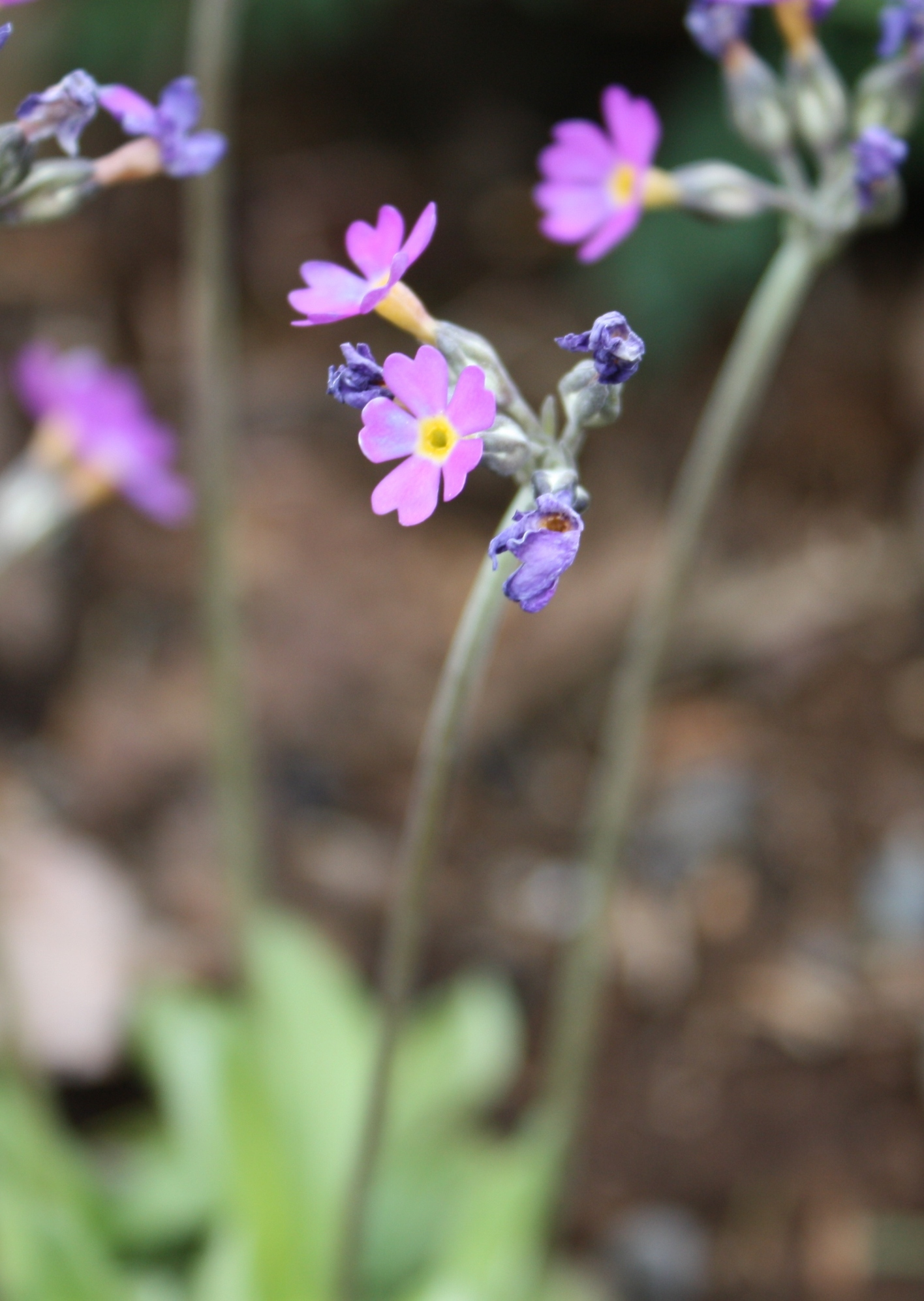
P. scandinavica flowers

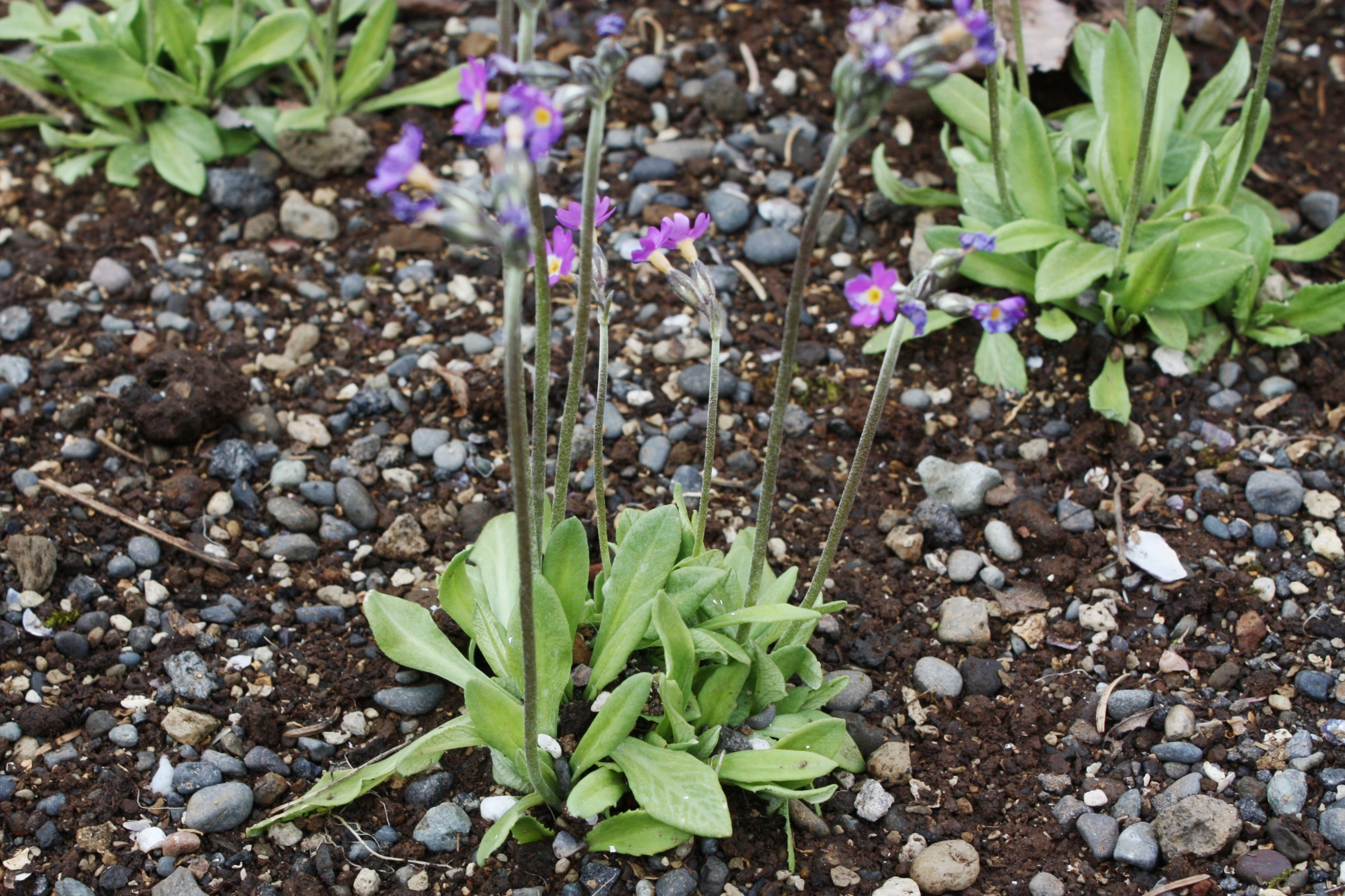
P. scandinavica growing within the Reykjavík Botanical Garden.
