= Birnam Oak =

Famous tree in Perth and Kinross, Scotland

Coordinates: 56.5609°N 3.5766°W

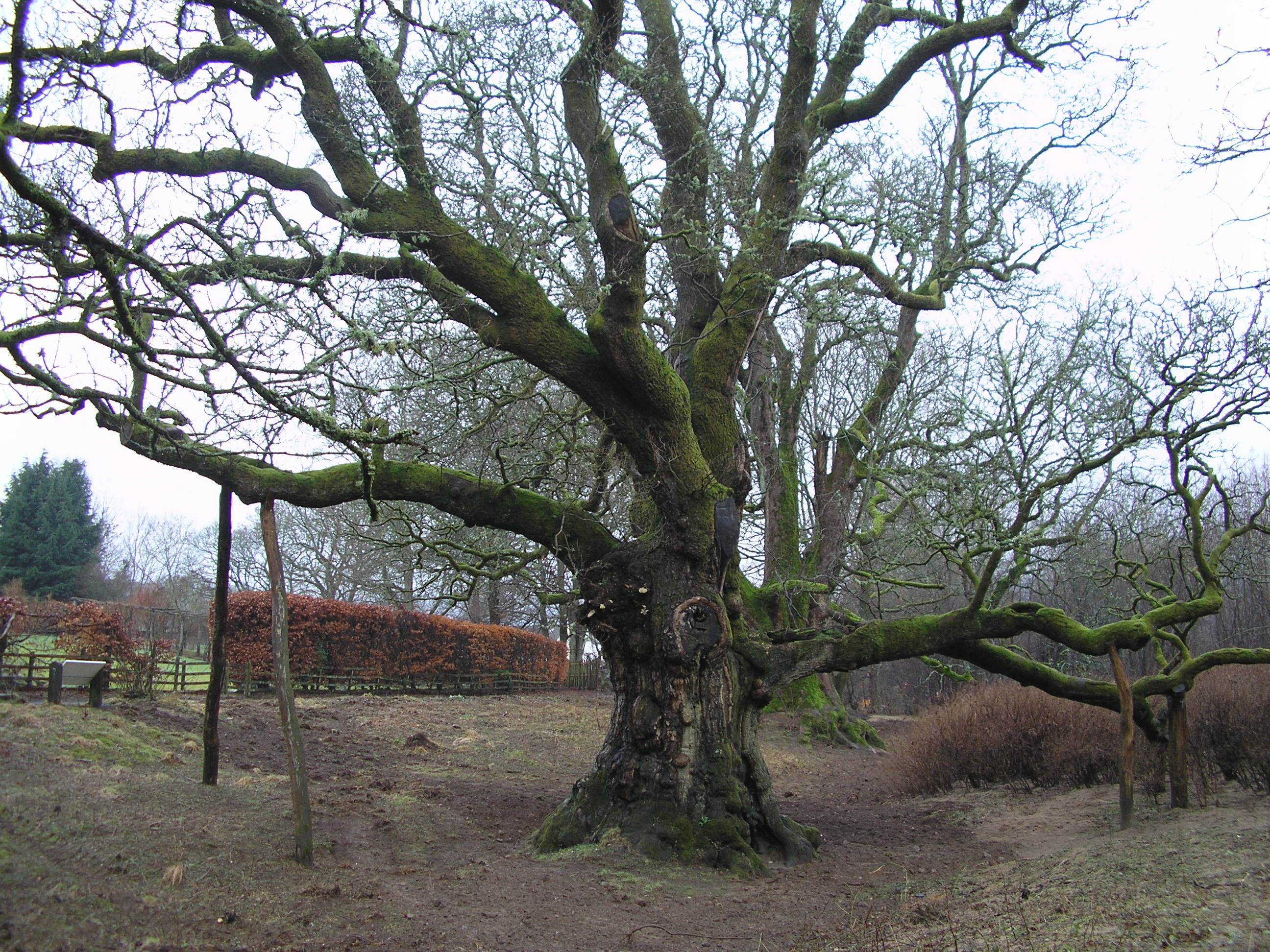
The Birnam Oak

The Birnam Oak is an example of Sessile oak (Quercus petraea) at Birnam, Perth and Kinross, Scotland (grid reference NO032421). Sometimes known as Macbeth's Oak, as it is a relic of Birnam Wood, mentioned in William Shakespeare's play Macbeth, the tree is found in a strip of woodland on the south bank of the River Tay. The trunk is 5.5 metres (18 ft) wide and its large spreading branches have latterly been supported on a number of struts to prevent them from collapsing under their own weight. The exact age is unknown, but the girth suggests an age of around 600 years old which would mean it was already a mature tree at the time of Shakespeare's presumed visit to Perthshire in 1589. The tree is listed by Forestry and Land Scotland as one of Scotland's most famous oak trees.

== See also ==
- List of individual trees
