= Rohallion railway station =

Disused railway station in Perth, Scotland

Rohallion

General information
- Location: Perth, Perth and Kinross; Scotland
- Coordinates: 56.533039°N 3.530438°W
- Grid reference: NO041404
- Platforms: 1

Other information
- Status: Disused

History
- Original company: Perth and Dunkeld Railway
- Pre-grouping: Inverness and Perth Junction Railway

Key dates
- February 1860: Opened (first in Bradshaw)
- October 1864: Closed
Location

Rohallion railway station was a private station from 1860 to 1864 on the Perth and Dunkeld Railway.

== History ==
The station opened in February 1860 by the Perth and Dunkeld Railway. It was a private station, built solely for William Drummond Stewart. It closed in October 1864 when trains stopped calling at the platform.

Preceding station	Historical railways	Following station
Dunkeld & Birnam; Line and station open	Perth and Dunkeld Railway	Murthly; Line open, station closed
