= Kenneth Macleay =

Kenneth Macleay may refer to:

- Kenneth Macleay (antiquary), Scottish antiquarian
- Kenneth Macleay (painter) (1802–1878), Scottish painter
- Ken MacLeay (born 1959), English-born Australian cricketer
- Kenneth Macleay Phin (1816–1888), Scottish minister
