= Jessie King (writer) =

Scottish author

- Born: Jessie Margaret King; 1862; Bankfoot, Perth and Kinross, Scotland
- Died: Unknown
- Occupations: author, journalist
- Writing career
- Pen name: Marguerite
- Language: English
- Genres: essays; poetry

Jessie King (pen name, Marguerite; 1862 – ?) was a Scottish essayist, poet, and journalist. Though she used a variety of pen names, she was widely and popularly known using the pseudonym “Marguerite”. King wrote for various publications. At the Dundee Evening Telegraph, she on topics of dress, men, women, and manners.

== Early years and education ==
Jessie Margaret King was born at Bankfoot, in the parish of Auchtergaven, Perthshire, in 1862, and received her education at the village school there. She was delicate as a child, but was very studious, and a great reader. Her father encouraged her in her studies. Every now and then, a box of miscellaneous reading magazines, reviews, and so forth would come on a carrier's cart from Perth, where her uncle, James Sprunt, was editor of the Perthshire Advertiser. At school, she was a good pupil, carrying off many prizes and the girls’ dux medal.

Preparing herself for a career as a teacher, but she had been only just entered at Sharp's Institution, Perth, when her father fell ill, and this altered all the family plans. After a long illness he died.

== Career ==
After her father's death, King began working in an office in the village. While there, the Free Church “Welfare of Youth of the Church Scheme” came into existence, and in the paper's “Essay Section” she found a place for her budding literary energies. The first year, she was seventh on the list, the next, she was first in the senior section and third in the junior. The following year, she again competed for both essays, and then carried off the first prize in the junior and senior sections. She continued to compete in connection with this “scheme” up to 1885, and gained four first prizes —— a medal accompanying each, including Junior Section first place with medal in July 1882, for her essay on "Elijah". After being two years in the Bankfoot office, King received an appointment in the Dundee Advertiser office, and shortly afterwards, attained a responsible and important position on the staff of the Dundee Evening Telegraph.

It was not until about 1884 that King began to write verse. Her first attempt, a poem entitled, “Cloudland," was printed. For a year or two, she wrote very frequently with most of her poems appearing under various pen-names in the Telegraph and Friend.

== Style ==
Her style was characterized as exceedingly attractive, terse, clear, and apt, while her original comments and reflections were judiciously and racily intermixed. She had a graphic pen, and possessed the faculty of always being able to seize upon points of interest and importance, and of giving due proportion and symmetry to the various phases of her subject.

Her poetry was highly imaginative, frequently lively, and sparkling and vivid in expression. There was felicity in her choice of subject, and an elevating method of treatment peculiarly her own. Her poems were marked by a high moral tone and deep human feeling, and they evinced power and facility over the difficulties of rhyme and versification.
