= Patric Park =

Scottish sculptor

Patric Park RSA, ARSA
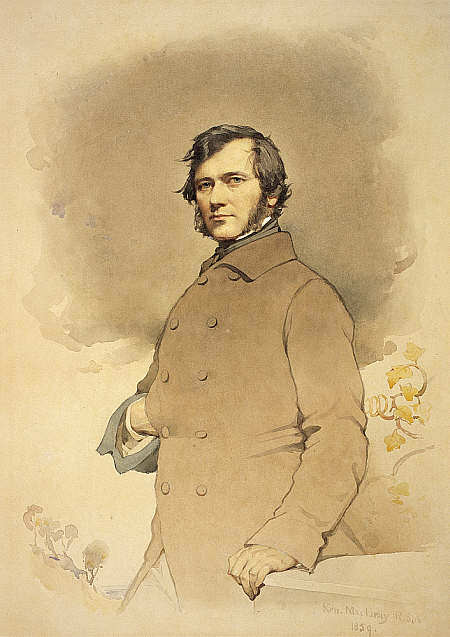
- Posthumous portrait, from photograph, by Kenneth Macleay
- Born: 12 February 1811; Glasgow, Scotland
- Died: 16 August 1855 (aged 44); Warrington, England
- Occupation: Sculptor

Patric Park (born 12 February 1811, Glasgow; died 16 August 1855, Warrington) was a Scottish sculptor.

== Life ==
He was the son of Matthew Park, a mason from a long line of masons, in Glasgow. At age 14, he was apprenticed to Edinburgh mason John Cornell. With Cornell, when aged only 16, Park was entrusted to carve the family coat of arms over the entrance of Hamilton Palace. From 1828 he worked with the architect James Gillespie Graham. Here he worked on Murthly Castle, which is mainly now demolished, but a chapel containing his work still survives.

From 1831 to 1833 he studied in Rome under Bertel Thorvaldsen. He was regarded as one of Scotland's finest portrait sculptors. His subjects included the miniaturist Kenneth Macleay (1802–78), who in turn made a posthumous portrait of Park, from a photograph, shown above.

He was elected an Associate of the Royal Scottish Academy in 1849, becoming a Fellow in 1851. He exhibited in the Royal Scottish Academy 1839-1855 and at the Royal Academy from 1832-1855. He also exhibited in the British Institution 1837-1854.

In 1841 he moved from London to Edinburgh, and in 1852 moved to Manchester.

He died suddenly at Warrington Railway Station, when he ruptured a blood vessel helping a porter with a heavy trunk.

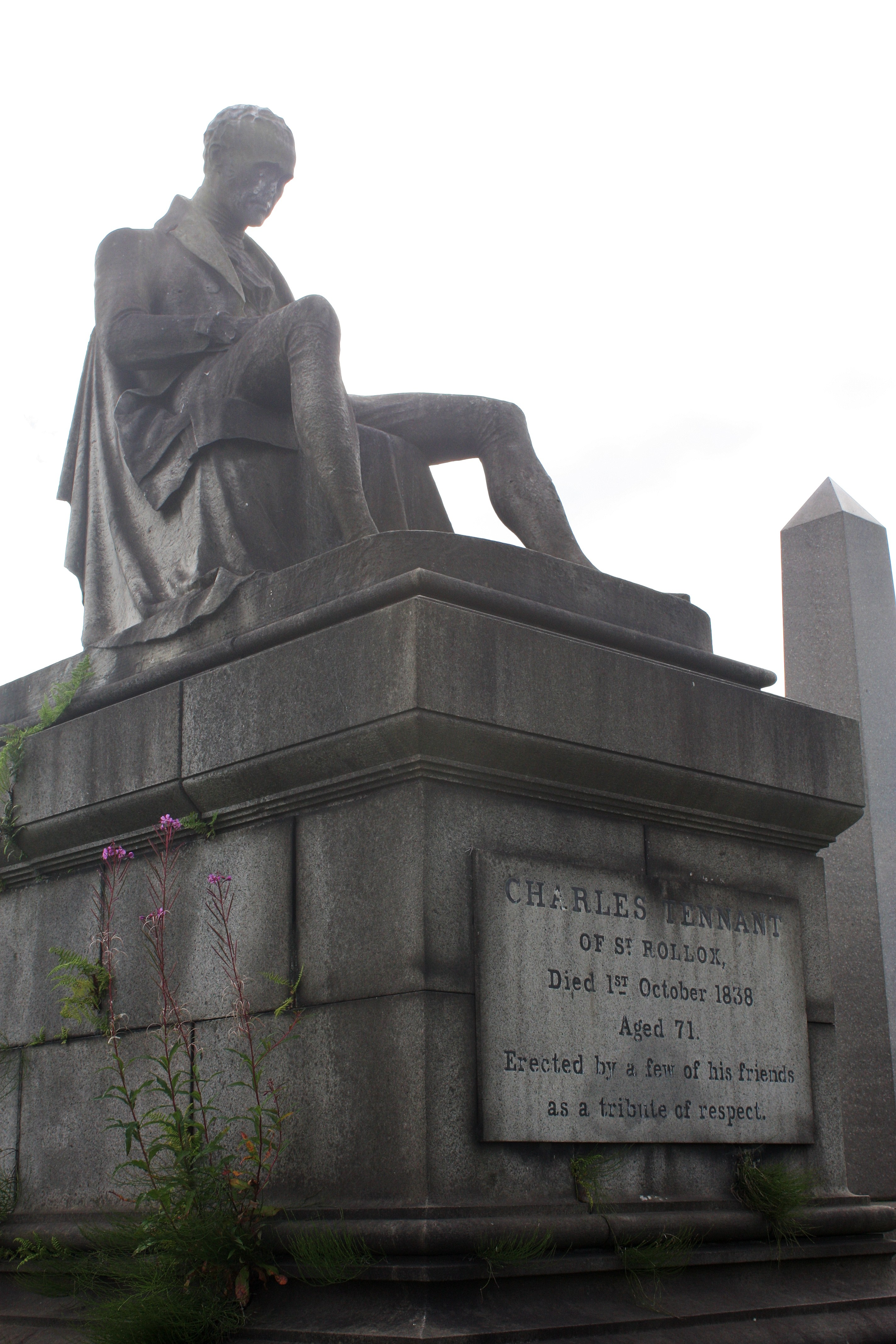
Charles Tennant's tomb

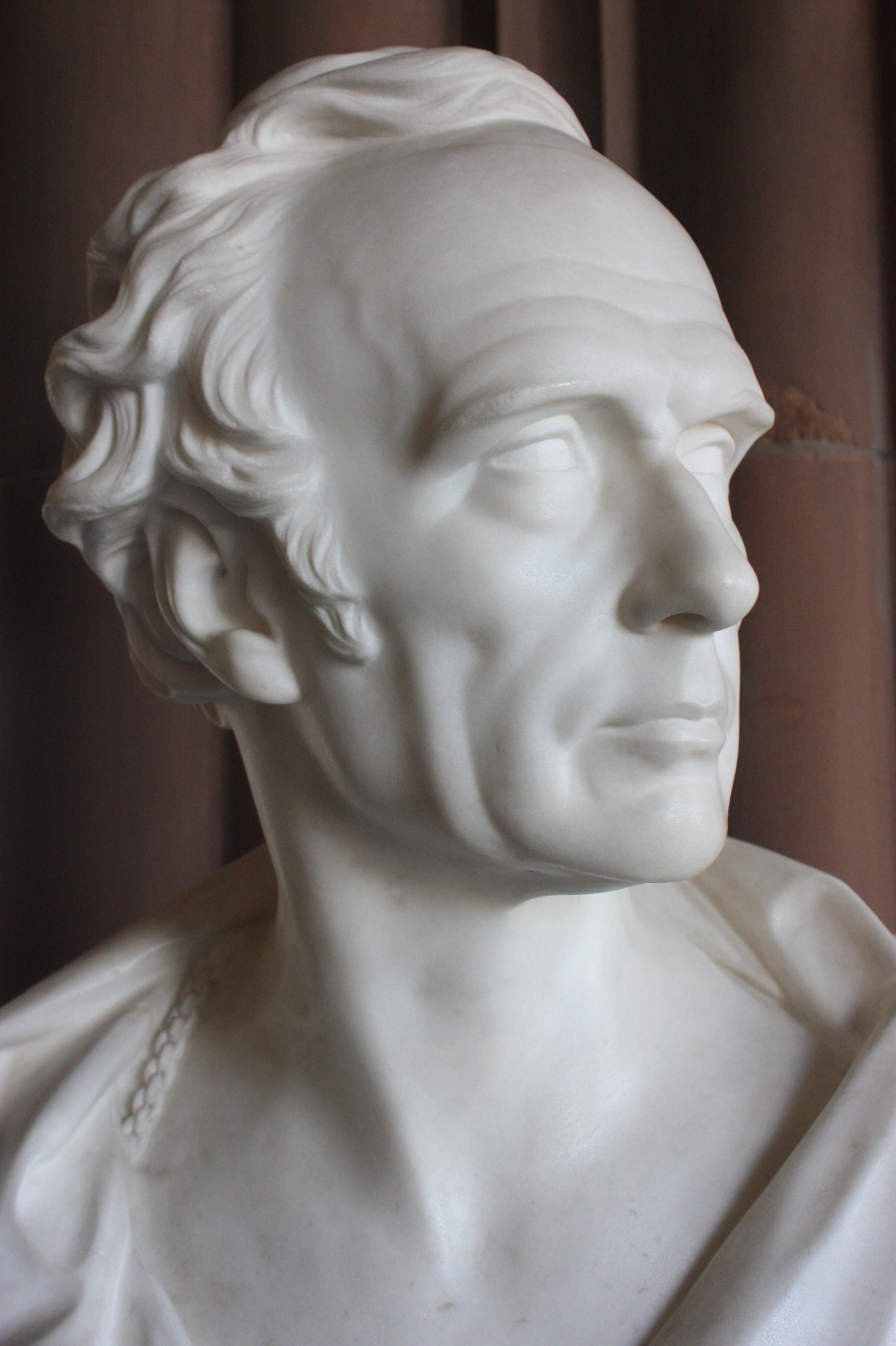
Sir John Watson Gordon by Patric Park 1852

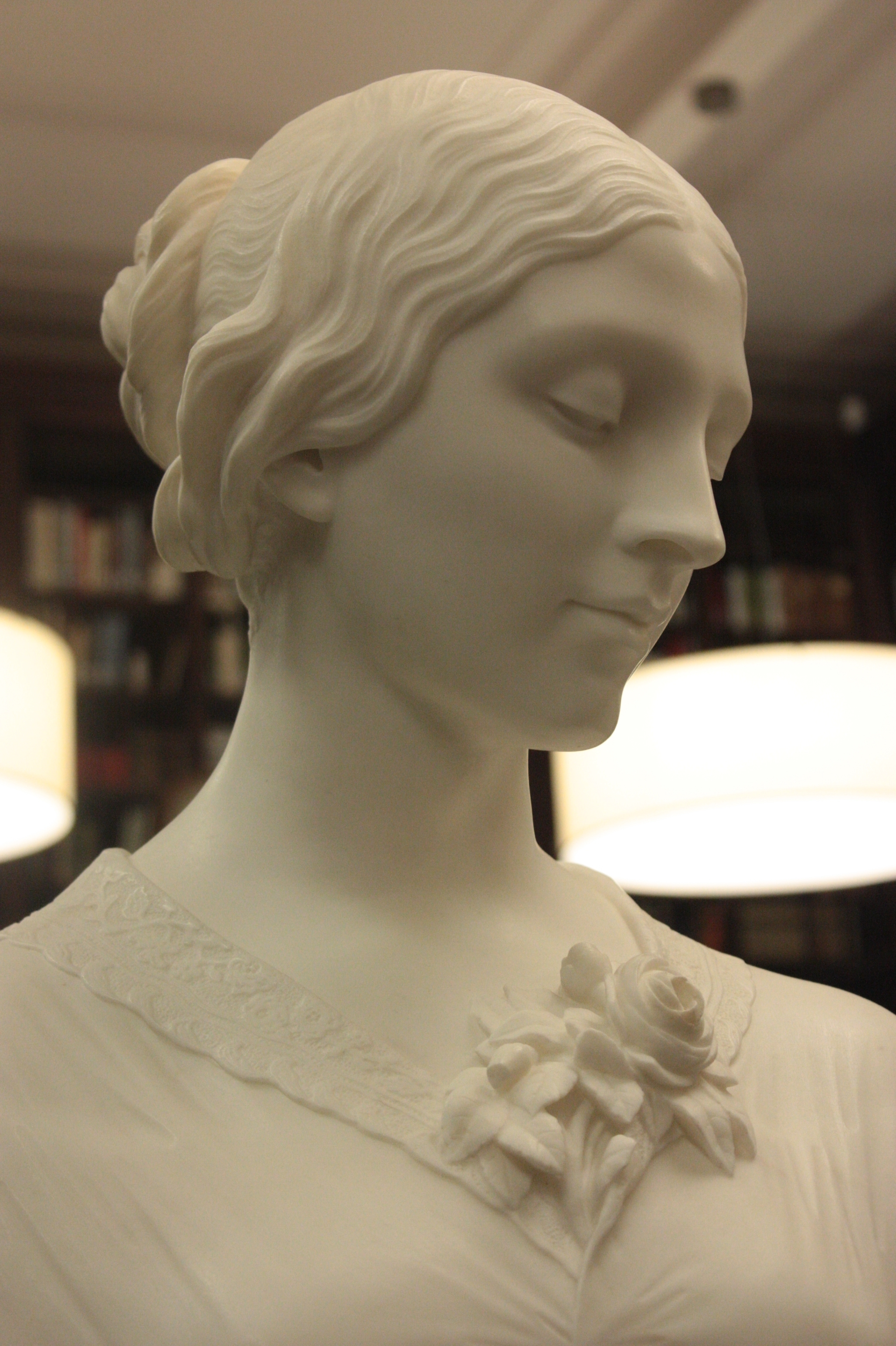
A Scotch Lassie by Patric Park, 1856

== Work ==
Two of his busts, depicting Admiral Thomas Cochrane, 10th Earl of Dundonald, and Sir James Young Simpson, discoverer of chloroform, are in the Scottish National Portrait Gallery. His 1838 seated marble figure of Charles Tennant of St Rollox is on Tennant's tomb at the Glasgow Necropolis. His 1845 bust of Robert Burns is in the Robert Burns Birthplace Museum and his bust of Napoleon III, purchased from the Paris International Exhibition of 1855, is in the Victoria and Albert Museum.

In 1839 he submitted a "fearsome design" as a memorial to Horatio Nelson of Nelson's dead body being carried by two heroic figures. The design was not accepted. A later figure (1846), "Modesty Unveiled", was refused by the Royal Academy due to its inappropriate content.

== List of works ==
- Bust of the Duke of Newcastle (1836)
- Monument to Andrew Skene, New Calton Cemetery (1837)
- Monument to Michael Sadler, Leeds Parish Church (1837)
- Monument to Charles Tennant, Glasgow Necropolis (1838) (a strangely relaxed seated pose)
- Monument to Jane Richardson, Sigglethorne (1839)
- Bust of Thomas Campbell (1839)
- Bust of John Landseer (1839)
- Bust of R. B. Haydon (1839)
- Bust of Lord Jeffrey, Scottish National Portrait Gallery (1840)
- Bust of David Octavius Hill, Scottish National Portrait Gallery (1842)
- Bust of James Jardine, Scottish National Portrait Gallery (1842)
- Bust of Charles Dickens (1842)
- Bust of James Oswald, Glasgow Art Gallery (1842)
- Statue "Eliza" (1843)
- Statue "Alexander" (1845)
- Bust of Adam Smith (1845), Kelvingrove Art Gallery
- Bust of the founder, Mr Huggins, Huggins College, Gravesend (1846)
- Bust of James Reddie, Library of the Royal Faculty of Procurators in Glasgow, Glasgow (1847)
- Bust of Earl of Dundonald (1848)
- Bust of Sir Harry Smith, 1st Baronet (1848)
- Bust of Horatio McCulloch, Royal Scottish Academy (1849)
- Bust of Prof Simpson, Scottish National Portrait Gallery (1850)
- Bust of Sir Archibald Alison, 1st Baronet, Scottish National Portrait Gallery (c.1850)
- Bust of Sir John Watson Gordon, Scottish National Portrait Gallery (1852)
- Bust of Sir Charles Napier for Napoleon III (1853)
- Bust of Rev Henry Grey, New College, Edinburgh (1853)
- Bust of Sir John Potter, Manchester Free Library (1854)
- Bust of Napoleon III at the Victoria and Albert Museum (1855)
- Bust of Sir Joseph Whitworth at the Whitworth Art Gallery (1855)
- "A Scotch Lassie", Scottish National Gallery (n.d.)
- Bust of James Hutton, Natural History Museum, London (n.d.)
- Bust of Sir James Hall, 4th Baronet, Natural History Museum, London (n.d.)
- Bust of David Hamilton, Glasgow Museum, (n.d)
- Bust of Charles Barry, Reform Club (n.d.)
- Bust of Sir William Fairbairn, Royal Society (n.d.)
- Bust of Hugh Heugh (1782-1846), New College, Edinburgh (n.d.)
