= Stanley (SMJR) railway station =

Former railway station in Scotland

Stanley

General information
- Location: Stanley, Perthshire; Scotland
- Coordinates: 56.4862°N 3.4439°W
- Grid reference: NO111336
- Platforms: 3 (1857 station)

Other information
- Status: Disused

History
- Original company: Scottish Midland Junction Railway
- Pre-grouping: Caledonian Railway
- Post-grouping: London, Midland and Scottish Railway

Key dates
- 2 August 1848: Station opened
- 1857: Station replaced
- 11 June 1956: station closed
Location

Stanley railway station was located in the Scottish village of Stanley, Perthshire and was opened in 1848 and closed in 1857, when the new station of Stanley Junction was built to the north in the location where the junction where the Perth and Dunkeld Railway diverged from the Scottish Midland Junction Railway running between Perth and Arbroath.

== History ==
Opened by the Scottish Midland Junction Railway, and absorbed into the Caledonian Railway, it became part of the London, Midland and Scottish Railway during the Grouping of 1923. Passing on to the Scottish Region of British Railways on nationalisation in 1948, it was then closed by the British Transport Commission.

| Preceding station | Historical railways | Following station |
|---|---|---|
| Strathord; Line open, station closed | Caledonian Railway; Scottish Midland Junction Railway | Cargill; Line and station closed |
| Strathord; Line open, station closed | Highland Railway; Perth and Dunkeld Railway | Murthly; Line open, station closed |
