= Murthly Panel =

Murthly

The Murthly Panel is a Pictish stone from Gellyburn, Murthly, Perth and Kinross, Scotland, dating to the early medieval period. It is made of pink sandstone and measures 575mm (maximum height) x 1015mm wide x 105mm (maximum thickness).

Found within 0.8km of the Pittensorn fragment and Gellyburn cross-slab, the Murthly Panel is now on display in the National Museum of Scotland in Edinburgh.

== Description ==
Carved in relief on one face, the Murthly Panel depicts a frieze of exotic animals and threatening monsters. These creatures have been interpreted as drawing on medieval bestiary texts modelled on late Antique motifs. The imagery on the Murthly Panel has no clear Christian function.

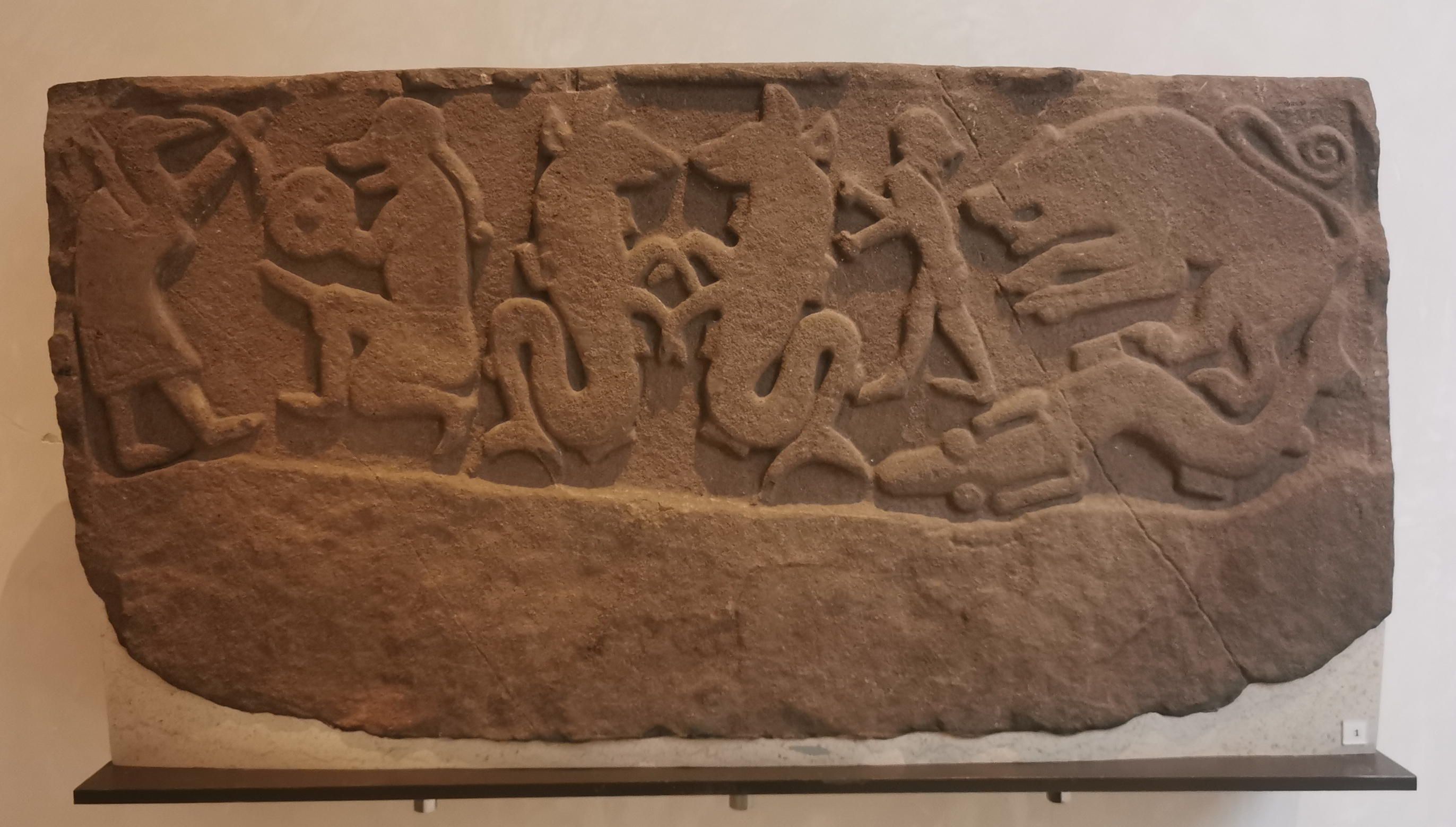
An image of the Murthly Panel in the National Museum of Scotland, Edinburgh.

The stone's imagery has been interpreted in several ways. The two central confronting seahorses have been identified as variants of the classical ketoi or hippocampi. The predator pursuing a human is a common motif in Pictish sculpture and has been interpreted as a satirical reversal of the hunting scenes found throughout Pictish sculpture or a vision of Hell and damnation. Meanwhile, the figure holding a shield has been described as an amphibian-like figure and tentatively identified as a salamander. The pairing of the hippocamp and the salamander alongside the S-shaped beasts (known as S-dragons) has been suggested to convey a salvific meaning.

Parallels have been drawn between the Murthly Panel and Meigle 26 as both stones share confronting seahorses (hippocampi) and a nude figure being chased by a predator.

== Form and use ==
It is unusual among Pictish stones that the Murthly Panel is both sculpted on only one face and that it features moulding at the top edges but not at the base edge. Its unevenness, rough dressing and depth have been taken to imply that it was once placed in a plinth and formed part of a larger monument or architectural arrangement.

One interpretation is that the panel formed the lower portion of a much larger cross-slab whose face was removed and cast aside so that the rest of the stone could be reused. The stone's discovery during ploughing has been cited in support of this. It has also been suggested that the panel was one side of a box shrine based on its similarity in shape and scale to another Pictish stone known as the Papil shrine, which also depicts confronting seahorses, fighting human figures and a predator in pursuit of human prey.
