= Luncarty railway station =

Disused railway station in Luncarty, Perth and Kinross

Luncarty
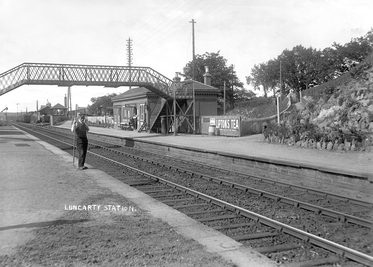
- The signal box (left) and station building in 1912

General information
- Location: Luncarty, Perth and Kinross; Scotland
- Coordinates: 56.4487°N 3.4717°W
- Grid reference: NO093294
- Platforms: 2

Other information
- Status: Disused

History
- Original company: Scottish Midland Junction Railway
- Pre-grouping: Caledonian Railway
- Post-grouping: London, Midland and Scottish Railway

Key dates
- 2 August 1848: Opened
- 18 June 1951: Closed
Location

Luncarty railway station served the village of Luncarty, Perth and Kinross, Scotland, from 1848 to 1951 on the Scottish Midland Junction Railway.

== History ==
The station opened on 2 August 1848 by the Scottish Midland Junction Railway. It closed to both passengers and goods traffic on 18 June 1951.

Preceding station	Historical railways	Following station
Muirton; Line open, station closed	Caledonian Railway; Scottish Midland Junction Railway	Strathord; Line open, station closed
Muirton; Line open, station closed	Highland Railway; Perth and Dunkeld Railway	Strathord; Line open, station closed
