= Muirton railway station =

Disused railway station in Muirton, Perth and Kinross

Coordinates: 56°24′18″N 3°26′54″W

Muirton

General information
- Location: Muirton, Perth and Kinross; Scotland

Other information
- Status: Disused

History
- Original company: London, Midland and Scottish Railway
- Post-grouping: London, Midland and Scottish Railway; British Railways (Scottish Region)

Key dates
- 31 October 1936: Opened
- 21 November 1959: Closed
Location

Muirton railway station, also known as Muirton Halt railway station, served the suburb of Muirton, Perth and Kinross, Scotland, from 1936 to 1959.

== History ==
The station opened on 31 October 1936 by the London Midland and Scottish Railway. It primarily served St Johnstone FC's football ground, Muirton Park. It was only used on match days and it closed on 21 November 1959.

Preceding station	Historical railways	Following station
Luncarty; Line open, station closed	London Midland and Scottish Railway	Perth; Line and station open
