= Murthly House =

Mansion in Perth and Kinross, Scotland

Coordinates: 56.5402°N 3.5105°W

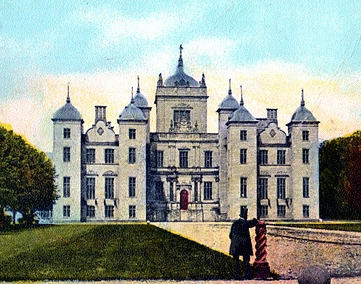
Murthly House

Murthly House, also known as New Murthly Castle, was a substantial mansion in Perth and Kinross, Scotland, designed by James Gillespie Graham and demolished in 1949–50. It was said to be unrivalled in its beauty.

== History ==
The house was commissioned by Sir John Archibald Drummond Stuart, 6th Baronet, who selected the eminent Edinburgh architect James Gillespie Graham for the task. The huge size of the house was said to arise from a rivalry with John Campbell, 1st Marquess of Breadalbane, who had recently built the huge Taymouth Castle. The house was intended to replace the nearby Murthly Castle, which ironically not only continued to be used, but still exists.

Graham usually worked in a controlled Georgian style, such as his Moray Estate scheme, but chose a highly unconventional Jacobean style, with detailing copied from George Heriot's School in Edinburgh, and was built in a highly ornate and symmetrical fashion, as might have been found in a 17th century Scottish palace. The decorative elements (crests and "buckle quoins") were made in the studio of John Steell. The project began in 1827 as soon as Drummond-Stewart became baronet (on the death of his father), but as the house was never completed it was never wholly occupied, but from 1831 it had a roof and was used for social events such as balls. Other than hosting the marriage of the laird to Jane daughter of the Earl of Moray, when it was perhaps fully occupied, it was never fully used again.

Augustus Pugin, a great admirer of Gillespie Graham, admitted to have been hugely influenced by the design of the house. Pugin became acquainted with Gillespie Graham and the project in 1829 and by 1831 was also involved creating "carvings" for the interior, including a drawing room in the style of Louis XIV (later moved to Murthly Castle).

John, the original laird died childless in Paris on 20 May 1838 and the huge and still unfinished project passed to his younger brother William Drummond Stewart, who had no interest in completing the project, and also inherited huge debts due to the project. More at home in America, where he had been for many years, he introduced American bison to the estate, before returning to America in 1842 once the debts were repaid. Some of the interiors were transferred to Murthly Castle around the time of a fire in 1845.

The house was included in the huge survey of stately homes in Scotland by MacGibbon & Ross in 1892.

The final laird was Donald Steuart Fothringham who saw the building as a burden and foolish decision of his ancestors. Demolition was proposed in October 1948 and began in 1949. The 200,000 tons of stone realised were partly used to build workers' housing (35 houses) at the nearby Pitlochry Hydro-electric scheme, plus a further 29 houses at Tarbet, but the rubble was largely as ballast for the dam associated with the scheme. Some of the larger blocks were used to repair the Dunkeld Bridge over the River Tay in Dunkeld.

Demolition was undertaken by the Dundee contractor, Charles Brand, who made a full photographic record of the progress.

The pitch pine roof beams were one of the few elements to be salvaged. Once the roof was removed (to extract organic material) the walls were destroyed by controlled explosions, overseen by David Faulds, an explosives expert from ICI's explosives section based at Ardeer who had been previously involved in major projects such as the destruction of The Crystal Palace. The final element removed was the huge central tower.

A collection of architectural drawings from the house were donated to the Victoria and Albert Museum and exhibited in May 1981.
