= Strathord railway station =

Disused railway station in Luncarty, Perth and Kinross

Coordinates: 56.4628°N 3.4732°W

Strathord

General information
- Location: Luncarty, Perth and Kinross; Scotland
- Platforms: 1 (upon opening); 2 (later added)

Other information
- Status: Disused

History
- Original company: Scottish Midland Junction Railway
- Pre-grouping: Caledonian Railway
- Post-grouping: London, Midland and Scottish Railway

Key dates
- 17 May 1849: Opened as Dunkeld Road
- February 1857: Name changed to Strathord
- 13 April 1931: Closed
Location

Strathord railway station served the village of Luncarty, Perth and Kinross, Scotland, from 1849 to 1931 on the Scottish Midland Junction Railway.

== History ==
The station opened as Dunkeld Road on 17 May 1849 by the Scottish Midland Junction Railway. To the north was the goods yard, to the south was a siding and on the northbound platform was a signal box. The station's name was changed to Strathord in February 1857. Around this time, the services were reduced to Tuesday, Friday and Saturday. A daily service resumed in January 1867. A second platform was added in 1906 when the Bankfoot Light Railway opened. The station closed on 13 April 1931.

| Preceding station | Historical railways | Following station |
|---|---|---|
| Stanley; Line open, station closed | Scottish Midland Junction Railway | Luncarty; Line open, station closed |
| Bankfoot; Line and station closed | Bankfoot Light Railway | Terminus |
