= Murthly Hospital =

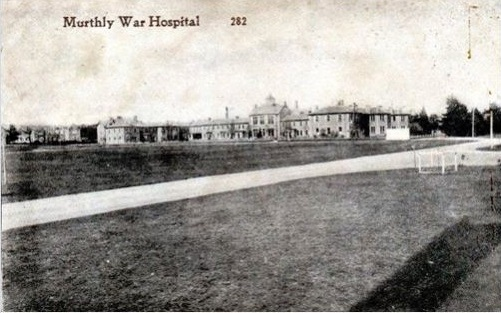
- Murthly Hospital

- Shown in Perth and Kinross

Geography
- Location: Murthly, Perthshire, Scotland
- Coordinates: 56.5320°N 3.4689°W

Organisation
- Care system: NHS Scotland
- Type: Specialist

Services
- Emergency department: No
- Speciality: Psychiatric hospital

History
- Founded: 1864
- Closed: 1984

Links
- Lists: Hospitals in Scotland

Murthly Hospital, previously known as Murthly Asylum, Perth District Asylum and Perth and District Mental Hospital was a psychiatric hospital in Murthly, Perthshire which operated for 120 years.

== History ==
The facility opened as Perthshire's district asylum to patients on 1 April 1864 to treat the county's 'pauper lunatics', and was the second district asylum in Scotland. It was built as a result of the Lunacy (Scotland) Act 1857 which created district boards with the power to found and run publicly funded asylums for patients who could not afford the fees charged by private asylums. Its location was remote, although the Highland Railway's mainline was relatively nearby. Rural locations were often chosen for such hospitals due to a belief that fresh air and separation from factors likely to cause anxiety would aid recovery. By July of its opening year it already had 172 patients.

The original superintendent of the hospital was Dr William M'Intosh who encouraged the hospital's policy of using occupation and exercise to help patients. This meant that patients were engaged in activities such as working in the grounds and sewing. Other activities included participation in sports such as football and curling in winter and cricket in summer. Walks in the countryside and dances were also organised for patients in the summer months.

The main building was designed by Dundee architects Edward and Robertson, and was able to accommodate 222 patients. Along with a governor's house, farm office and other works, the contract for construction was valued at £18,000. An administrative block was added in around 1871. The grounds included a stone circle, which prior to the laying of the asylum would have stood in an open field. When the asylum was being built cinerary urns were uncovered near the circle, including one which contained some partially burnt human bones.

In 1894 it became one of the first asylums to build villas for its patients in an attempt to develop a 'colony or village system' of patient accommodation. During the First World War, it was used as a war hospital, offering beds for 350 other ranks. It was also used as a Military Psychiatric Hospital from 1917 to 1919, while its civilian patients were sent to other hospitals.

At one point the complex included its own cemetery and a tramway linked it to Murthly railway station. By 1964 it was being run by the Board of Management for the Murray Royal & Murthly Hospitals. Training in nursing was carried out at the hospital, with the Murray and Murthly Hospitals Group Training School merging into Perth College of Nursing and Midwifery in 1969.

After the introduction of Care in the Community in the early 1980s, the hospital went into a period of decline and closed in 1984. While the main building was demolished, an administration block was retained and some of the villas are thought to survive.

The archives of the hospital are held by the University of Dundee's Archive Services as part of the NHS Tayside Archives.
