= Murthly railway station =

Disused railway station in Murthly, Perth and Kinross

Murthly
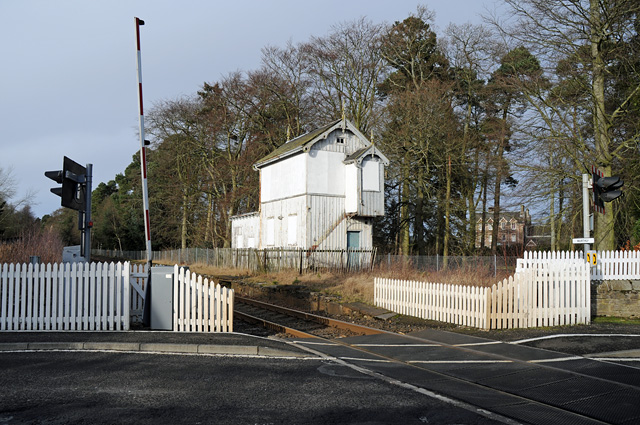
- Level crossing and disused signal box at the site of the former station

General information
- Location: Murthly, Perth and Kinross; Scotland
- Coordinates: 56°31′43″N 3°27′47″W
- Grid reference: NO101383
- Platforms: 2

Other information
- Status: Disused

History
- Original company: Perth and Dunkeld Railway
- Pre-grouping: Highland Railway
- Post-grouping: London, Midland and Scottish Railway

Key dates
- 7 April 1856: Opened
- 3 May 1965: Closed
Location

Murthly railway station served the village of Murthly, Perth and Kinross, Scotland from 1856 to 1965 on the Perth and Dunkeld Railway. The railway line which the station was on is still active, being the Highland Main Line.

== History ==
The station opened on 7 April 1856 by the Perth and Dunkeld Railway. It closed to both passengers and goods traffic on 3 May 1965.

The station signal box, built in 1898 for the Highland Railway, was relocated from Inverness to Murthly in 1919. It is considered at high risk due to its structural deterioration.

Preceding station	Historical railways	Following station
Stanley; Line open, station closed	Highland Railway; Perth and Dunkeld Railway	Rohallion; Line open, station closed
