= Bankfoot =

Coordinates: 56.501°N 3.516°W

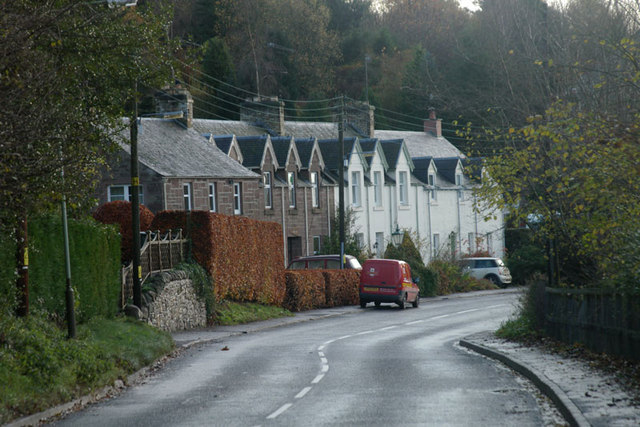
- A view south along Bankfoot's Dunkeld Road

- Location within Perth and Kinross
- Population: 1,254
- OS grid reference: NO067354
- Council area: Perth and Kinross
- Lieutenancy area: Perth and Kinross
- Country: Scotland
- Sovereign state: United Kingdom
- Post town: PERTH
- Postcode district: PH1
- Dialling code: 01738
- Police: Scotland
- Fire: Scottish
- Ambulance: Scottish
- UK Parliament: Angus and Perthshire Glens
- Scottish Parliament: Perthshire North

Bankfoot is a village in Perth and Kinross, Scotland, approximately 8 miles (13 km) north of Perth and 7 miles (11 km) south of Dunkeld. The village lies close to the A9 trunk road, making Bankfoot a convenient base for commuting within Perthshire.

Bankfoot had a population of 1,254 people across 563 households in the 2022 Scotland's Census. 26.7% of residents were aged 65 years old and over.

== Education ==
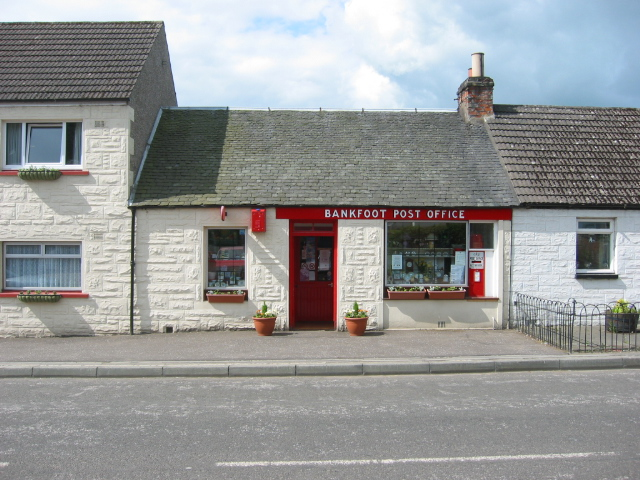
Bankfoot Post Office was on the village's Main Street. It closed in 2008, with its services moved inside a nearby convenience store. As of 2017, this building is now occupied by an architect's office

The village has a primary school – Auchtergaven Primary School – which is named after the Church of Scotland parish of Auchtergaven, in which Bankfoot resides.

== Public spaces ==
The Bankfoot Church Centre opened in October 2008 to replace the nineteenth century church building which was destroyed by fire in February 2004. The building is used every day by many groups, fitting its tag line during the build "Bankfoot Church and Community Building Together".

== Sport ==
=== Football ===
Bankfoot was home to the junior football club Bankfoot Athletic.

=== Other sports ===
Bankfoot has a tennis club with two courts, a badminton club and a bowling club, which hosted the Caledonia Challenge Cup in August 2010.

== Public transport ==
=== Train ===
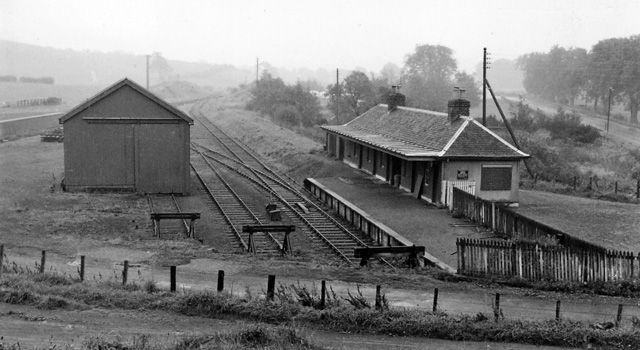
Bankfoot railway station in 1961.

Until 1931 Bankfoot had a railway station, Bankfoot railway station, which was on the branch line to and from Perth railway station.

=== Bus ===
A bus service, started in the 1930s, of Stanley-based Allan & Scott, used to run the 5 miles (8 kilometres) between Stanley and Bankfoot twice a day on Sundays. The service was taken over in 1946 by A&C McLennan of Spittalfield. Permission to use double decker buses was granted in 1950. In 1952, the fare was 5 1/2 shillings single and 10 shillings return, with gradual increases to 8 shillings single and one farthing return by 1963. By 1966, the service operated only on the first Sunday of each month. Service was withdrawn in 1967, although A&C McLennan was still in operation in 1969.

== Notable residents ==
- Robert Nicoll (1814 - 1837) - Scottish poet and lyricist. Born at Little Tullybelton, in Auchtergaven parish, less than two miles west of Bankfoot.
- Miles Briggs - MSP
- Jessie Margaret King (1862–?), writer

== See also ==
- List of places in Perth and Kinross
