= Bankfoot railway station =

Disused railway station in Bankfoot, Perth and Kinross

Bankfoot
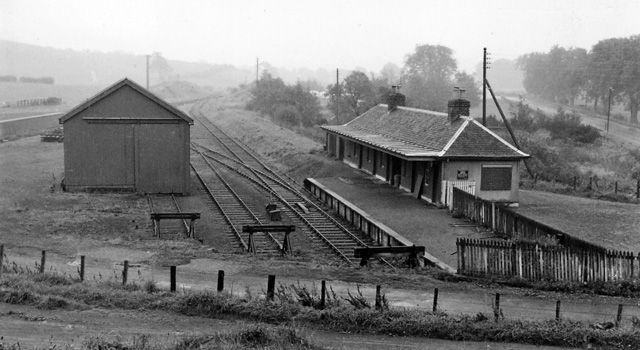
- The station in 1961

General information
- Location: Bankfoot, Perth and Kinross; Scotland
- Coordinates: 56.499°N 3.5125°W
- Grid reference: NO069351
- Platforms: 1

Other information
- Status: Disused

History
- Original company: Bankfoot Railway
- Pre-grouping: Caledonian Railway
- Post-grouping: London, Midland and Scottish Railway

Key dates
- 7 May 1906: Opened
- 13 April 1931: Closed to passengers
- 7 September 1964: Closed to goods
Location

Bankfoot railway station served the village of Bankfoot, Perth and Kinross, Scotland, from 1906 to 1964 on the Bankfoot Light Railway. In 1911, the registered office of the light railway was at 27 South Methven Street in Perth.

== History ==
The Bankfoot Light Railway was authorised by the Bankfoot Light Railway Order 1898, and given addition time to complete construction by the Bankfoot Light Railway (Extension of Time) Order 1903.

The station opened on 7 May 1906 by the Bankfoot Railway. It was the northern terminus of a short branch line and was north of Strathord station. Opposite the only platform were goods sidings and a goods shed.

The Bankfoot Light Railway was absorbed by the Caledonian Railway under the Caledonian Railway Order Confirmation Act 1913 (3 & 4 Geo. 5. c. xxix). The station was closed to passengers on 13 April 1931 and closed to goods traffic on 7 September 1964. The site became a caravan site with the platform surviving; now it is a housing estate.

Preceding station	Disused railways	Following station
Terminus	Bankfoot Light Railway	Strathord; Line and station closed
