= William Drummond Stewart =

Scottish adventurer & military officer (1795-1871)

Sir William Drummond Stewart, Bt
- Born: 26 December 1795; Murthly Castle, Perthshire
- Died: 28 April 1871 (aged 75)
- Burial place: Chapel of St. Anthony the Eremite, Murthly Castle
- Military career
- Allegiance: United Kingdom
- Branch: British Army
- Service years: 1812–1820
- Rank: Captain
- Units: 6th Dragoon Guards; 15th The King's Hussars
- Conflicts: Peninsular War; Waterloo
- Awards: Knight of the Military Order of Christ

Sir William Drummond Stewart, 7th Baronet (26 December 1795 – 28 April 1871) was a Scottish adventurer and British military officer. He travelled extensively in the American West for nearly seven years in the 1830s. In 1837 he took along the American artist, Alfred Jacob Miller, hiring him to do sketches of the trip. Many of his completed oil paintings of American Indian life and the Rocky Mountains originally hung in Murthly Castle, though they have now been dispersed to a number of private and public collections.

After his older brother John Stewart died childless in 1838, William inherited the baronetcy and returned to Scotland. In 1842 he returned to America, and in the summer of 1843 hosted a private rendezvous-style party at a remote lake in the Rocky Mountains (now called Fremont Lake). On that trip Jean Baptiste Charbonneau, the son of Sacagawea of the Lewis and Clark Expedition was hired to care for the mules. The so-called "pleasure trip" ended in a dispute that split the party and caused Stewart to return to Scotland earlier than he had planned. Stewart has been portrayed for adding a "homosexual dimension" to the historiography of the American frontier.

== Early life and education ==
Born at Murthly Castle, Perthshire, Scotland, Stewart was the second son and one of seven children of Sir George Stewart, 17th Laird of Grandtully, 5th Baronet of Murthly and of Blair. The family decided that William would go into the Army (as his older brother would inherit his father's estate and title). After his seventeenth birthday in 1812, William asked his father to buy him a cornetcy in the 6th Dragoon Guards. After his appointment was confirmed on 15 April 1813 he immediately joined his regiment and began a programme of rigorous training.

== Career ==
Stewart was anxious to participate in military action; on 22 December 1813 his father purchased for him an appointment to a lieutenancy in the 15th King's Hussars, which was already in action during the Peninsular War. The appointment was confirmed on 6 January 1814 and Stewart joined his regiment, subsequently seeing combat during the Waterloo campaign in 1815. On 15 June 1820 Stewart was promoted to a captain and soon thereafter retired on half pay.

== Marriage and offspring ==
By a servant girl named Christina Marie Battersby he had an illegitimate son, George Stewart, born in 1831. He acknowledged the boy, known as "Will", as his, and assumed full financial responsibility for both mother and son. He never lived under the same roof as Battersby, but he did marry her later in life to legitimise Will for purposes of inheritance. Despite his marriage, Stewart later entered a same-sex relationship with French Canadian-Cree hunter Antoine Clement that lasted for nearly a decade. This relationship is detailed in Stewart's two autobiographical novels.

The younger Stewart had an illustrious career in the British Army and was awarded the Victoria Cross for his actions in relieving the Siege of Lucknow during the Indian Mutiny. He predeceased his father, however, succumbing to injuries sustained during a drunken attempt to demonstrate sword swallowing.

== American West (1832–1838) ==
William Drummond Stewart, 1844 by Henry Inman

Seeking adventure, Stewart travelled to St. Louis, Missouri, in 1832, where he brought letters of introduction to William Clark, Pierre Chouteau Jr.; William Ashley and other prominent residents. He arranged to accompany Robert Campbell, who was taking a pack train to the 1833 rendezvous of mountain men. The party left St. Louis on 7 May and attended the Horse Creek Rendezvous in the Green River Valley of Wyoming. Here Stewart met the mountain men Jim Bridger and Thomas Fitzpatrick, as well as Benjamin Bonneville, who was leading a governmental expedition in the area. With some of the men, Stewart visited the Big Horn Mountains, wintered at Taos, and attended the next rendezvous at Ham's Fork of the Green River. Later that year, he journeyed to Fort Vancouver, 90 miles up the Columbia River from the Pacific Ocean.

Stewart attended the 1835 rendezvous at the mouth of New Fork River on the Green and reached St. Louis in November. Finding that his finances were curtailed because his brother had failed to forward his share of the estate left by their father, Stewart went to New Orleans, speculated in cotton to recoup, and wintered in Cuba. In May, he joined Fitzpatrick's train to the Rockies for another rendezvous on Horse Creek. He wintered in 1836–1837 and 1837–1838 at New Orleans, where he speculated again in cotton. In 1838 he learned that his childless older brother John had died of an undisclosed disease (probably cancer). William Stewart would become the seventh baronet of Murthly.

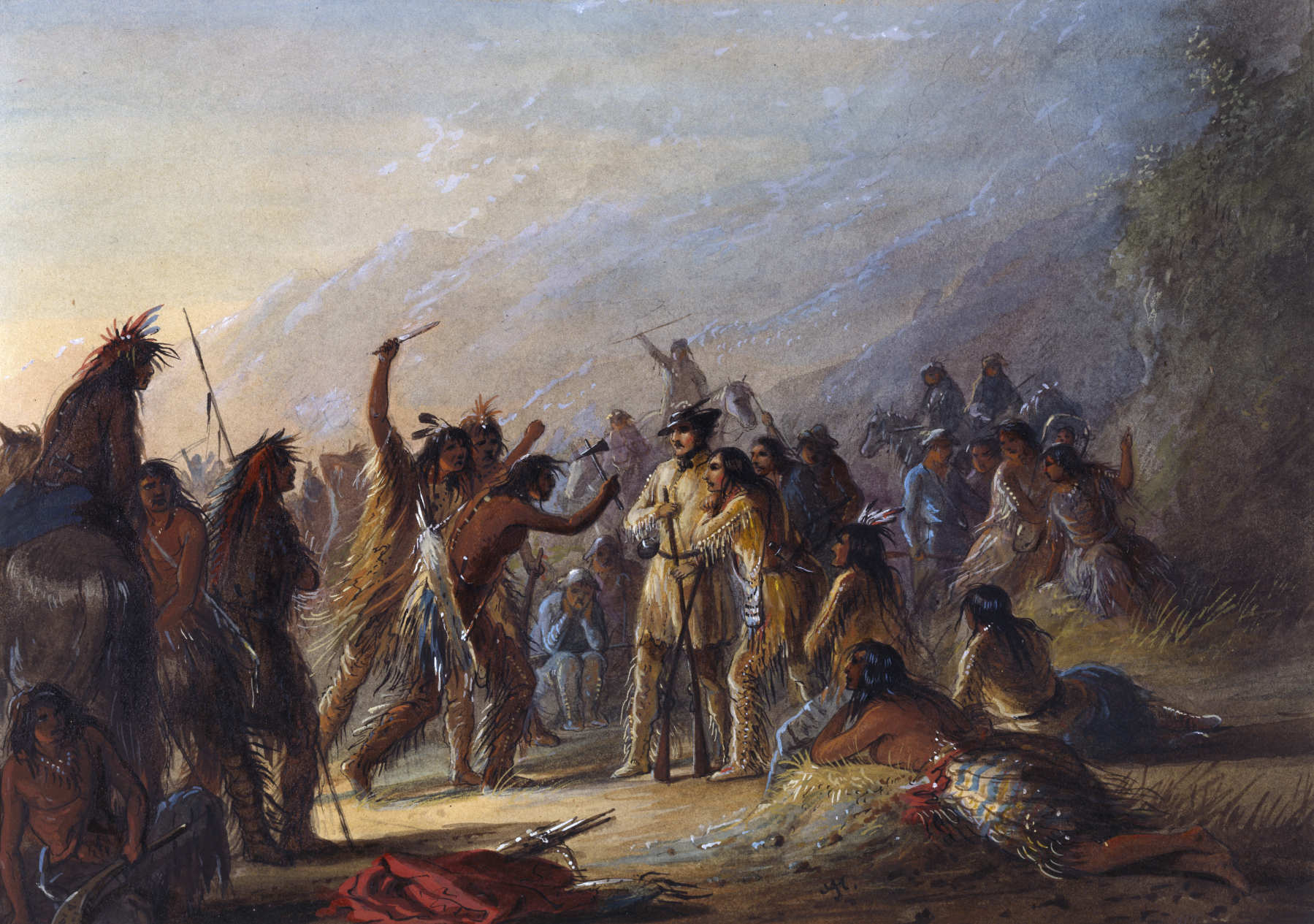
In this painting, artist Alfred Jacob Miller recreates a scene depicting Stewart standing his ground against Crow Indians. The Walters Art Museum.

For the Rocky Mountain Rendezvous of 1837, Stewart took along an American artist, Alfred Jacob Miller, whom he hired in New Orleans. Miller painted a notable series of works on the mountain men, the rendezvous, American Indians, and Rocky Mountain scenes. In 1839 he delivered finished oils to Stewart, who hung the works in Dalpowie Lodge on the Murthly estate. Working from watercolor sketches he had made during their trip to the Rockies, Miller painted many canvases while an artist in residence on the estate.

Stewart returned to Scotland and Murthly Castle in June 1839 with his romantic partner Antoine Clement, and the couple lived in Dalpowie Lodge, while entertaining in Murthly Castle. Stewart explained Clement's presence by at first referring to him as his valet, then as his footman. Because Clement was restless and unhappy in Scotland, the couple spent many months travelling abroad, including an extended visit to the Middle East.

Stewart's elder brother, John the 6th baronet, had incurred extensive debts in constructing a new Murthly Castle. When attempts to earn extra income by hosting hunting parties proved disappointing, Stewart finally sold one the family's estates, Logiealmond Castle. The sale provided him with enough money to pay off his brother's debts and to allow him to return to the United States for an extended, lavish party held in the Rockies.

7th Baronet of Blair, 1837, by Alfred Jacob Miller

Stewart returned to North America in late 1842, and in September 1843 he and a large entourage travelled to what is now Fremont Lake. Stewart brought with him a large array of velvet and silk Renaissance costumes for his all-male guests to wear during the festivities. Fur trader William Sublette co-hosted the party with Stewart. Though there had been no rendezvous since 1840, the party had many elements of the old Rocky Mountain gatherings. Stewart had planned to spend the winter of 1843–1844 in New Orleans, and visit Taos and Santa Fe the following spring, but the Renaissance pleasure trip ended in a "scandal" that led him to leave for Scotland immediately, never to return to the United States.

Stewart's later life was one of turmoil and alienation from his family. His son George Stewart died from a self-inflicted sword swallowing injury in 1868. In 1856 Stewart's friend Ebenezer Nichols, his wife, and three sons, visited from Texas. When it came time to leave Scotland, the Nicholses' middle son, Franc, refused to return home. He instead stayed on with Stewart at Murthly Castle, eventually being adopted by Stewart and becoming his primary heir. Stewart died of pneumonia on 28 April 1871.

== See also ==
- Stewart baronets
- Drummond-Stewart baronets

== Sources ==
- William Benemann, Men in Eden: William Drummond Stewart and Same-Sex Desire in the Rocky Mountain Fur Trade, (Lincoln: University of Nebraska Press, 2012) excerpt and text search
- Mae Reed Porter and Odessa Davenport, Scotsman in Buckskin: Sir William Drummond Stewart and the Rocky Mountain Fur Trade, London: Hastings House (1963)
- The Complete Baronetage, London, 1983, edited by Cokayne, George Edward, Reference: IV 325
- "Men of Paradise", University Of Nebraska Press, 2012, by William Benemann

Baronetage of Great Britain
Preceded by John Archibald Drummond Stewart	Baronet (of Blair and Balcaskie); 1838–1871	Succeeded by Archibald Douglas Drummond Stewart
