= Kenneth Macleay (antiquary) =

Scottish antiquarian

- Born: 10 August 1768; Kiltarlity, Scotland
- Died: 14 December 1858 (aged 90); Richmond, Tasmania, Australia
- Occupation: Antiquarian

Kenneth Macleay the elder (10 August 1768 - 14 December 1858) was a Scottish antiquarian.

== Biography ==
Macleay practised as a physician in Glasgow. He wrote:

'Description of the Spar Cave lately discovered in the Isle of Skye,' 8vo, Edinburgh, 1811, to which was subjoined John Leyden's poem of 'The Mermaid.' 'Historical Memoirs of Rob Roy and the Clan Macgregor; including original notices of Lady Grange, with an introductory sketch illustrative of the condition of the Highlands prior to 1745,' 8vo, Glasgow, 1818; other editions 1818, 1819, and 1881. This deservedly popular book was compiled with scrupulous care from original documents and oral tradition whenever deemed genuine. Macleay was father of Kenneth Macleay the younger.
