= Stanley, Perthshire =

Village in Perth and Kinross, Scotland

Coordinates: 56.47953°N 3.437853°W

Stanley
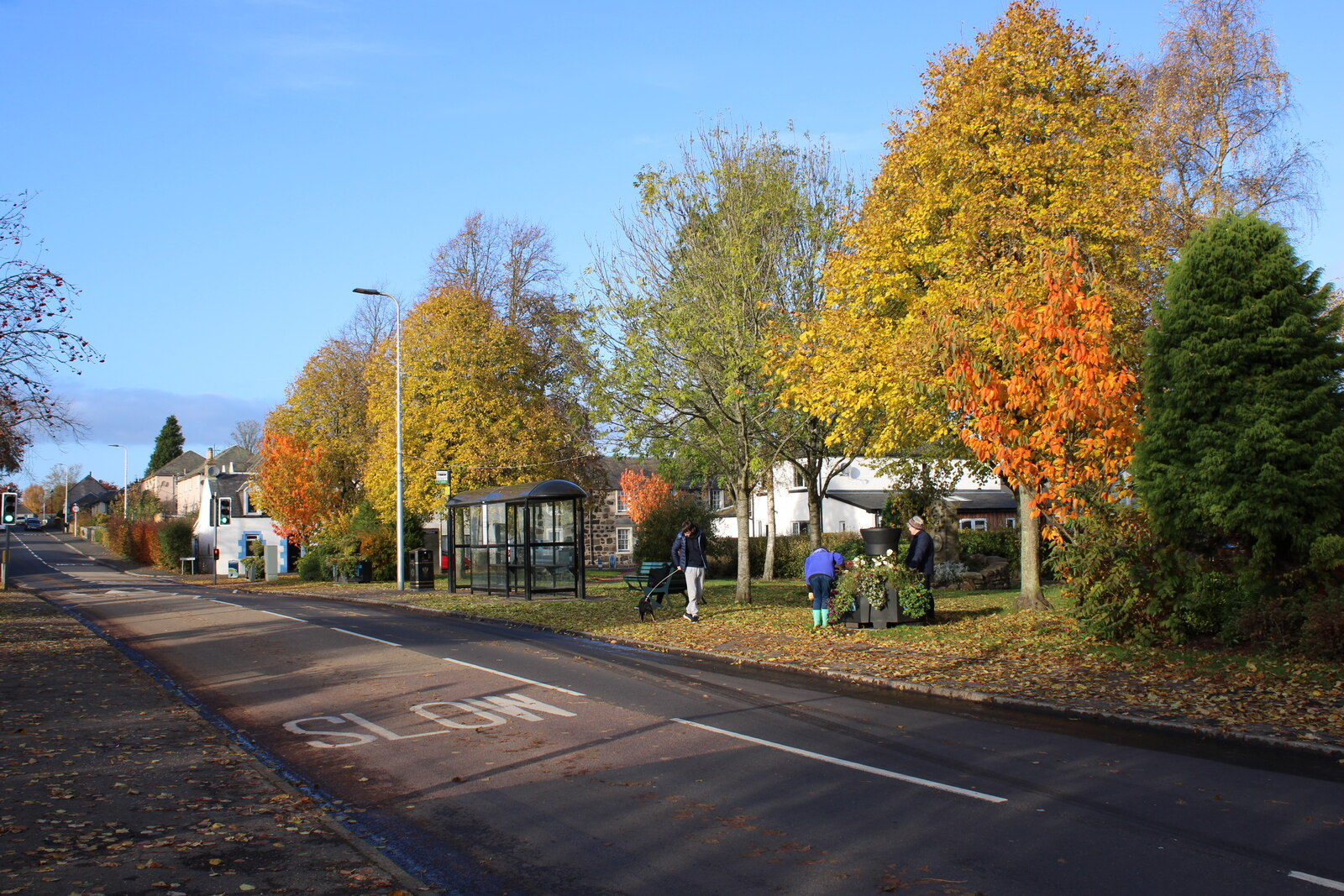
- Perth Road in Stanley

- Location within Perth and Kinross
- Population: 1,500 (2020)
- OS grid reference: NO114328
  - Edinburgh: 38 mi (61 km)
  - London: 369 mi (594 km)
- Council area: Perth and Kinross
- Country: Scotland
- Sovereign state: United Kingdom
- Post town: Perth
- Postcode district: PH1
- Police: Scotland
- Fire: Scottish
- Ambulance: Scottish
- UK Parliament: Angus and Perthshire Glens
- Scottish Parliament: Perthshire North

Stanley is a village on the north side of the River Tay in Perthshire, Scotland, around 6 miles (10 kilometres) north of Perth.

== Etymology ==
The village of Stanley gains its name from Lady Amelia Stanley, the daughter of James Stanley, 7th Earl of Derby. In the 1600s the area around Stanley was part of the estate of the Earls of Atholl and was also the location of Inchbervis Castle. In 1659 the castle was renamed Stanley House in honour of the wedding of John Murray, 1st Marquess of Atholl and Lady Stanley. When the village was built in the 1700s it took the name Stanley after the nearby house.

== History ==
John Murray, the 4th Duke of Atholl, decided in the 18th century to harness the nearby River Tay to power a cotton mill. Richard Arkwright, an inventor of cotton-spinning machinery was persuaded by George Dempster (the local MP), while Dempster was visiting Cromford in Derbyshire, to come to Scotland to set up a cotton mill in Stanley as well as one at New Lanark. Stanley Mills opened in 1787, and by its 10th year employed 350 people.

The village of Stanley was built to house the workers of the mill. Work on the village began in 1784. It was designed by the Duke of Atholl's factor James Stobie. By 1799 the village's population was around 400, and by 1831 it had reached around 2,000 residents, about 50% of whom worked in the mill.

== Stanley Mill ==
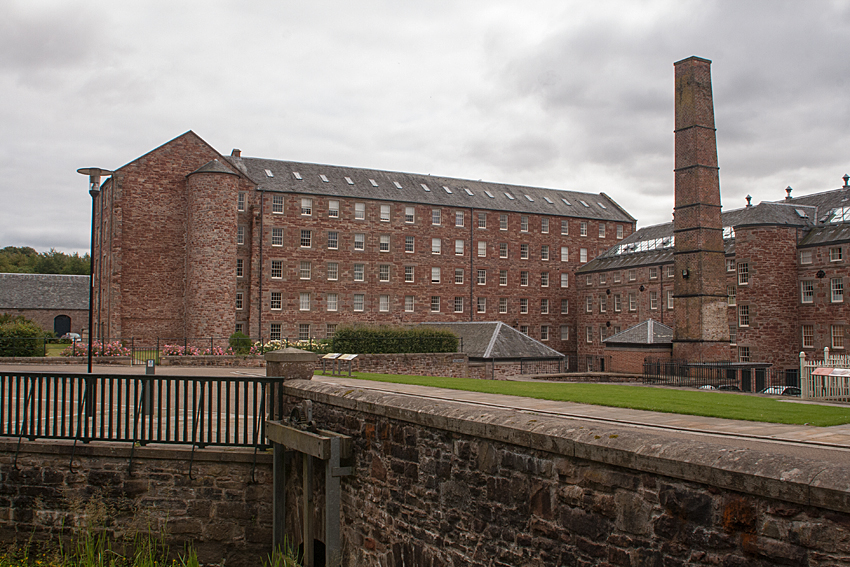
Stanley Mills

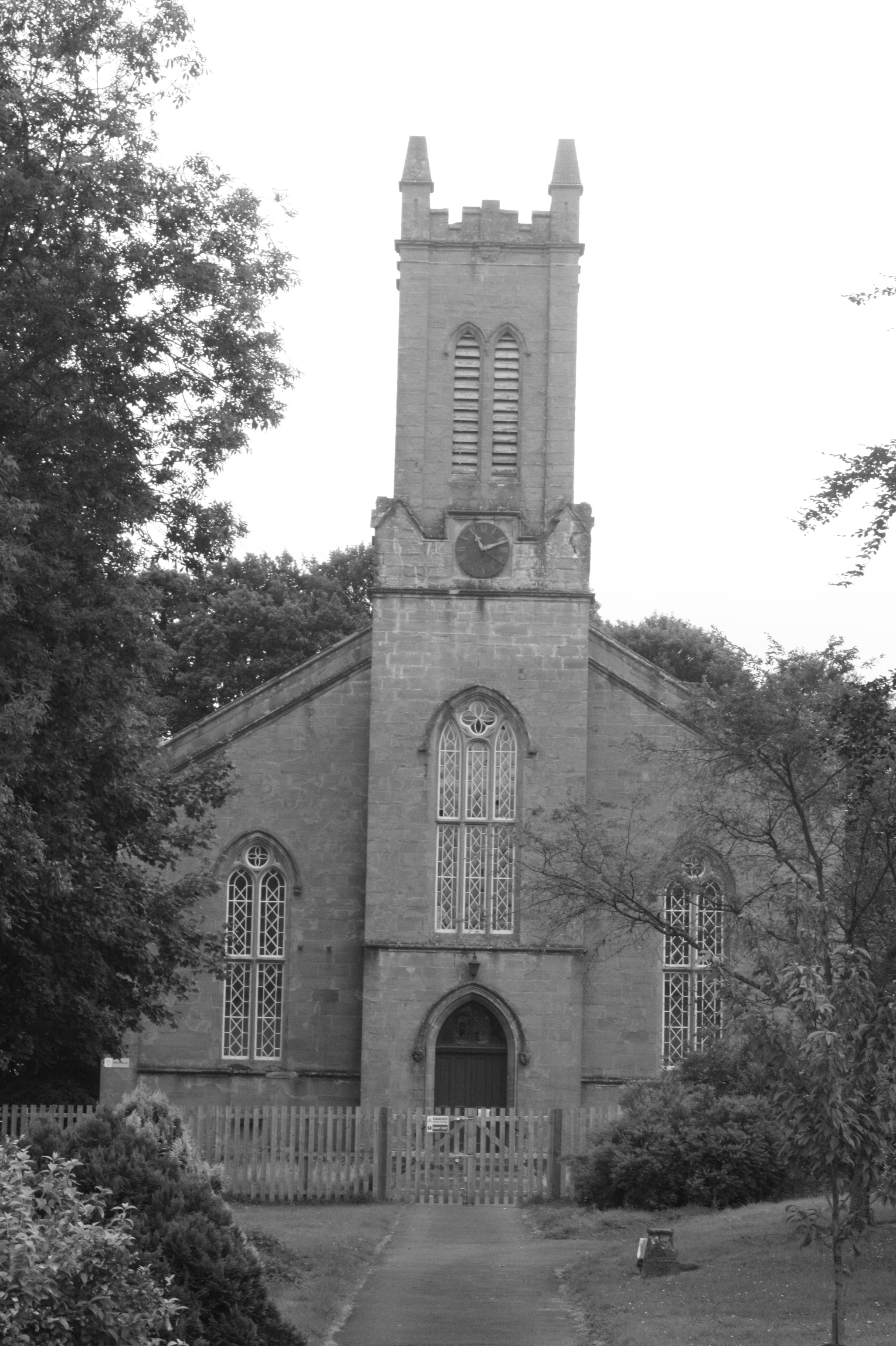
Stanley Church, Perthshire

The mill was originally water-powered but was later converted to steam and finally to electric power. For most of its history it produced cotton thread, but in the 20th century changed to cotton belting, sold around the world to drive machinery. The Dempster & Co company was established in 1787 by seven men including Richard Arkwright, George Dempster and William Sandeman to build the mill on land feued from the Duke of Atholl to provide employment to Highlanders affected by the clearances. A fire in 1799 destroyed a large section of the mill. It reopened in 1802, advice from David Dale of New Lanark making for a close resemblance.

The mill used coal gas for lighting until 1921, when this was replaced by a hydroelectric power plant, which was built to also supply electricity to the village. The power station was closed in 1965 but was reopened in 2003 by npower.

From the 1960s the mill was in decline, and it finally closed down in 1989. After that the mill fell derelict. Historic Scotland bought the mill in 1995 and over the next ten years, in liaison with the Phoenix Trust, the buildings were renovated and turned into private flats plus a museum depicting life in the 19th century and the story of the mill.

== Sport ==
The section of the River Tay near the village is a popular location for canoeing and fishing. Fishing permits are required for brown trout or salmon; only fly fishing is allowed.

Stanley F.C. was an association football club from 1890 until it was disbanded in 1954.

== Public transport ==
=== Train ===
A railway station was built in Stanley in 1848. This later evolved into a junction station, as it lay at the point where the branch line to Forfar diverged from the Highland Main Line. The Highland Main Line still runs through the village, but the station was closed in 1956.

=== Bus ===
A bus service, started in the 1930s, of Stanley-based Allan & Scott, used to run the five miles between Stanley and Bankfoot twice a day on Sundays. The service was taken over in 1946 by A&C McLennan of Spittalfield. Permission to use double decker buses was granted in 1950. In 1952, the fare was 5 1/2 shillings single and 10 shillings return, with gradual increases to 8 shillings single and one farthing return by 1963. By 1966, the service operated only on the first Sunday of each month. Service was withdrawn in 1967, although A&C McLennan was still in operation in 1969.

== Ballathie House ==
Ballathie House was built during the 1850s near Stanley. It was built by the Robertson family, the land having originally been owned by the Drummond family, the Earls of Perth. Since 1972 it has operated as a country house hotel.
