= Perth and Dunkeld Railway =

Scottish railway company

Overview
- Locale: Scotland

History
- Opened: 7 April 1856
- Successor line: Inverness and Perth Junction Railway

Technical
- Track gauge: 1,435 mm (4 ft 8 1/2 in)

The Perth and Dunkeld Railway was a Scottish railway company. It was built from a junction with the Scottish Midland Junction Railway at Stanley, north of Perth, to a terminus at Birnam, on the south bank of the River Tay opposite Dunkeld.

It was promoted by local landed proprietors, and opened in 1856. As a minor branch line inconveniently serving a modest town, its financial performance was poor. However, when a railway line from Inverness to Perth was promoted, the Dunkeld line was taken as part of the new route, which opened in 1863; the Perth and Dunkeld Railway Company ceased to exist, and the line was now part of the Inverness and Perth Junction Railway.

The original line of the P&DR continues in use today, an intrinsic part of the Highland Main Line.

== Independence at first ==
Aberdeen was connected to the railway network of Central Scotland in 1850. Inverness too expected a southward connection, but the intervening terrain was unpromising, and two railway schemes proposed a connection instead to Aberdeen, a route that was unattractive to Inverness interests. A line from Inverness along the coast and striking south from Nairn was proposed, but did not find favour in Parliament. The lengthy deviation through Aberdeen was a continuing source of dissatisfaction.

In 1845 the Scottish Midland Junction Railway promoted a branch line from Inverness to Dunkeld. The Scottish Midland Junction Railway Branches Act 1846 (9 & 10 Vict. c. lxxv) was passed, but there were serious difficulties in agreeing the terms for acquisition of necessary land from Sir William Drummond Stewart. These difficulties proved so severe that construction was never started, and the project did not go forward.

Perth and Dunkeld Railway Act 1854
- Act of Parliament
- Parliament of the United Kingdom
- Long title: An Act for making a Railway from the Scottish Midland Junction Railway near Stanley to Birnam near Dunkeld in the County of Perth.
- Citation: 17 & 18 Vict. c. cxlviii

Dates
- Royal assent: 10 July 1854

Text of statute as originally enacted

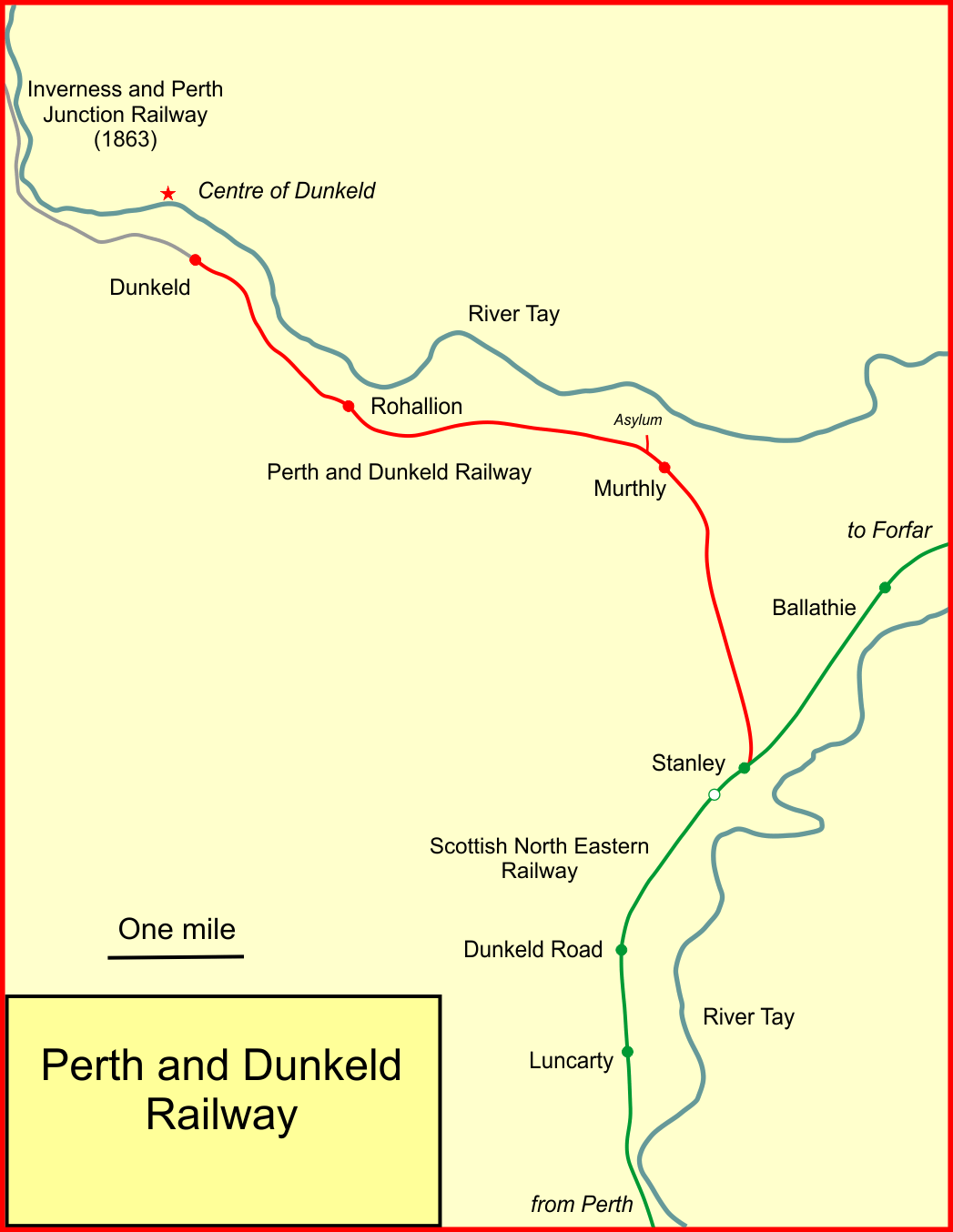
The Perth and Dunkeld Railway system

An independent company was promoted to build a similar line from a junction with the Scottish Midland Junction Railway at Stanley to Dunkeld. Stanley was 7 miles (11 km) north of Inverness and the length of the newly authorised line would be 8 miles (13 km). There were lengthy discussions among the titled and wealthy promoters as to the route to be adopted; in particular which side of the River Tay to follow. The Perth and Dunkeld Railway Act 1854 (17 & 18 Vict. c. cxlviii) was given royal assent on 10 July 1854. Authorised capital was £80,000. However, despite the line's title, it was not to terminate at Dunkeld, but at Birnam, on the south side of the River Tay. There was a toll bridge to cross the river. The toll provided a useful income for the Duke of Atholl.

In addition there was disagreement with the Scottish Midland Junction Railway over the station at Stanley, which they had opened in 1848. It was located near the village, but some distance from the proposed point of junction with the P&DR. (Note: It is implied in Fenwick and Sinclair, page 16, that the difficulty may have been that the primitive system of train control on single lines at the time required a station master at an actual station to authorise a train to proceed.) The P&DR built a small goods station at the junction, but in fact the SMJR moved its station to that point in 1856. This made the station inconvenient for the community at Stanley.

Construction began in July 1854; the engineer was John Stewart of Edinburgh and the contractors were William Leslie of Aberdeen "on behalf of" himself, J. R. Davidson and W. Oughterson of London; their tender was £50,000. The construction was swiftly completed and Colonel Wynne of the Board of Trade carried out an inspection on 13 March 1856, and expressed himself satisfied.

There was a ceremonial opening of the line on 5 April 1856; the ordinary train service of three trains daily between Perth and Birnam started on 7 April 1856. The trains were operated by the Scottish Midland Junction Railway (SMJR). The SMJR found the income from its operation (50% of net receipts) to be disappointing and inadequate, and it is suggested by Thomas that the SMJR failed to optimise profitable working of the line. The SMJR merged with the Aberdeen Railway in June 1856, the combined company being the Scottish North Eastern Railway.

A private halt was constructed at Rohallion in 1859 for the benefit of the landowner, Sir William Drummond Stewart. (Note: Slightly differently expressed in Quick, based on an article by N. Sinclair in Highland Railway Journal, no. 60.)

== On the main line ==
Interests in Inverness continued to seek a direct railway to the south, and the obvious alignment would go through Perth. This crystallised on a project that came to be the Inverness and Perth Junction Railway: it was planned to leave the Inverness – Aberdeen line at Forres, 24 miles (39 km) east of Inverness, and from there turn south. There was to be a summit at Dava, 1,052 feet (321 m) above sea level, and the route continued by way of Grantown-on-Spey and the west bank of the River Spey to Kingussie. There followed a long, steep climb up the northern slopes of the Grampian Mountains to the head of the Druimuachdar Pass, and a corresponding descent to Blair Atholl and the Pass of Killiecrankie. Crossing the River Tay near Dalguise, the line reached Dunkeld, where it made an end-on junction with the Perth & Dunkeld Railway.

Inverness and Perth Junction and Perth and Dunkeld Railways Amalgamation Act 1863
- Act of Parliament
- Parliament of the United Kingdom
- Long title: An Act for the Amalgamation of the Perth and Dunkeld Railway Company with the Inverness and Perth Junction Railway Company.
- Citation: 26 & 27 Vict. c. lviii

Dates
- Royal assent: 8 June 1863

The little Perth and Dunkeld line was therefore to become part of an important main line. The Inverness and Perth Junction Railway was authorised by the Inverness and Perth Junction Railway Act 1861 (24 & 25 Vict. c. clxxxvi) on 22 July 1861. The first section of the new line was opened, from "Dunkeld" to Pitlochry, on 1 June 1863, and the I&PJR company took over the working of the Perth and Dunkeld Railway. line was opened throughout on 9 September 1863. By the Inverness and Perth Junction and Perth and Dunkeld Railways Amalgamation Act 1863 (26 & 27 Vict. c. lviii) of 8 June 1863 the Dunkeld company was absorbed by the I&PJR, with effect from 1 March 1864. (Note: Or the previous day, according to Vallance, pages 28–29, and also Fenwick and Sinclair, page 34)

== Kingswood passing loop ==
A passing loop was commissioned at Kingswood between Murthly and Dunkeld in 1908.

== Murthly Mental Hospital connection ==
The Perth District Asylum was located at Murthly, completed in 1864 at a cost of £30,000. It was later enlarged. A tramway connected the station with the asylum gasworks, for the bringing in of fuel and other stores. The tramway was later extended to run to the asylum main building in addition.

== Current operations ==
The line is in operation today as part of the Highland Main Line between Perth and Inverness. Only Dunkeld station remains open.

== Locations ==
- Stanley Junction; divergence from Strathmore route (to Forfar and Aberdeen);
- Murthly; opened 7 April 1856; closed 3 May 1965;
- Rohallion; first shown in Bradshaw February 1860; Fridays only service; last in Bradshaw's Guide October 1864; continued in use as Private station;
- Dunkeld; opened 7 April 1856; various name changes; Dunkeld & Birnam; Birnam & Dunkeld; open now (2022) as Dunkeld & Birnam.
