= List of listed buildings in Auchtergaven, Perth and Kinross =

This is a list of listed buildings in the parish of Auchtergaven in Perth and Kinross, Scotland.

== List ==
Name	Location	Date Listed	Grid Ref. (Note: Sometimes known as OSGB36, the grid reference (where provided) is based on the British national grid reference system used by the Ordnance Survey. • "Guide to National Grid". Ordnance Survey. • "Get-a-map". Ordnance Survey.)	Geo-coordinates	Notes	LB Number (Note: Historic Environment Scotland assign a unique alphanumeric identifier to each designated site in Scotland, for listed buildings this always begins with "LB", for example "LB12345".)	Image
Tullybelton House Stables				56°29′07″N 3°34′10″W	Category B	4479	Upload Photo
5-29 (Odd Numbers) Percy Street				56°28′52″N 3°26′54″W	Category C(S)	4481	Upload Photo
Bell Mill, Or West Mill, Stanley Mills Including Iron Gangway, Belt Proofing Machine And West Sluice Chamber				56°28′45″N 3°26′27″W	Category A	4486	Upload Photo
'Lawers', Dunkeld Road, Bankfoot				56°30′05″N 3°31′02″W	Category C(S)	4499	Upload Photo
Hydro-Electric Power Station, Stanley Mills				56°28′45″N 3°26′16″W	Category B	6627	Upload Photo
Logiebride Churchyard				56°29′25″N 3°32′44″W	Category C(S)	4480	Upload Photo
Glenshee				56°29′22″N 3°39′13″W	Category C(S)	6691	Upload Photo
Waterloo Kennels				56°30′52″N 3°31′52″W	Category C(S)	4477	Upload Photo
31-39 (Odd Nos,) Percy Street				56°28′52″N 3°26′53″W	Category C(S)	4482	Upload Photo
Mains Of Airleywight, Farmhouse				56°30′39″N 3°31′59″W	Category B	4473	Upload Photo
Muirheadston Farm				56°31′29″N 3°33′12″W	Category B	4475	Upload Photo
Robert Nicoll's Monument, Little Tullybelton				56°29′34″N 3°33′59″W	Category C(S)	4476	Upload Photo
Tullybelton House				56°29′06″N 3°34′08″W	Category C(S)	4478	Upload Photo
East Range, Cotton Warehouse And Workshops, Stanley Mills				56°28′45″N 3°26′21″W	Category B	4491	Upload Photo
Waterloo Farm, Farmhouse				56°30′58″N 3°32′03″W	Category C(S)	4474	Upload Photo
West Lodge, Stanley Mills				56°28′46″N 3°26′28″W	Category B	4485	Upload Photo
North Range (Office, Canteen, Tape Department And East Lodge), Stanley Mills				56°28′47″N 3°26′22″W	Category B	4490	Upload Photo
Parish Church, At Bankfoot				56°30′01″N 3°30′46″W	Category B	4498	Upload Photo
Chimney Stalk, Stanley Mills				56°28′45″N 3°26′25″W	Category B	6689	Upload Photo
Mid Mill, Stanley Mills, Including Cotton Machinery				56°28′44″N 3°26′26″W	Category A	4489	Upload Photo
Bankfoot Hotel, Dunkeld Road				56°30′02″N 3°30′53″W	Category C(S)	4500	Upload Photo
39, 41, 43 King Street				56°28′52″N 3°26′44″W	Category C(S)	162	Upload Photo
45 King Street				56°28′52″N 3°26′43″W	Category C(S)	4487	Upload Photo
East Mill, Stanley Mills, With Mill Pond And Sluice				56°28′45″N 3°26′23″W	Category A	6690	Upload Photo
'Kilbayne', Dunkeld Road				56°30′02″N 3°30′52″W	Category C(S)	4471	Upload Photo
Airleywight House				56°30′09″N 3°31′40″W	Category B	4472	Upload Photo
17-27 King Street, At W. Corner With Charlotte Street				56°28′50″N 3°26′50″W	Category B	4483	Upload Photo
42-44 King Street				56°28′51″N 3°26′44″W	Category C(S)	4484	Upload Photo
47-49 King Street And Corner Of Mill Street				56°28′52″N 3°26′43″W	Category C(S)	4488	Upload Photo
Bayne Villa, Mrs Taylor Dunkeld Rd				56°30′02″N 3°30′53″W	Category C(S)	4501	Upload Photo
Inchbervis Castle				56°28′46″N 3°25′32″W	Category B	47552	Upload Photo

== Key ==
The scheme for classifying buildings in Scotland is:

- Category A: "buildings of national or international importance, either architectural or historic; or fine, little-altered examples of some particular period, style or building type."
- Category B: "buildings of regional or more than local importance; or major examples of some particular period, style or building type, which may have been altered."
- Category C: "buildings of local importance; lesser examples of any period, style, or building type, as originally constructed or moderately altered; and simple traditional buildings which group well with other listed buildings."

In March 2016 there were 47,288 listed buildings in Scotland. Of these, 8% were Category A, and 50% were Category B, with the remaining 42% being Category C.
