= Murthly =

Murthly: Scottish Gaelic: Mòrthlaich
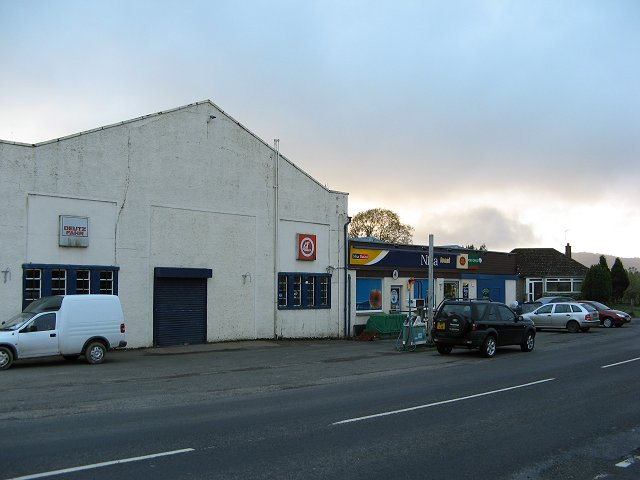
- Murthly Garage in the centre of Murthly

- Location within Perth and Kinross
- Population: 590 (2020)
- Council area: Perth and Kinross
- Country: Scotland
- Sovereign state: United Kingdom
- Post town: PERTH
- Postcode district: PH14
- Dialling code: 01738
- UK Parliament: Angus and Perthshire Glens
- Scottish Parliament: Perthshire North

Murthly (Scottish Gaelic Mòrthlaich) is a village in Perth and Kinross, Scotland. It lies on the south bank of the River Tay, 5 miles (8 kilometres) southeast of Dunkeld, and 9 1/2 miles (15 kilometres) north of Perth. Perth District Asylum, later known as Murthly Hospital, was opened in the village on 1 April 1864 for 'pauper lunatics'. It was the second district asylum to be built in Scotland under the terms of the Lunacy (Scotland) Act 1857. It closed in 1984 and was later demolished. The village has a stone circle, in the former grounds of the hospital. The village formerly had a railway station on the Perth and Dunkeld Railway, which closed in 1965.

== History ==
Around 1770, the Hermitage Bridge at the nearby Hermitage was built by order of John Murray, 3rd Duke of Atholl, presumably to gain access across to some lands leased from Sir John Stewart of Murthly, as well as assisting with the views of the Black Linn and its falls. It has since become a major landscape feature and has been the subject of several paintings and sketches, including from George Washington Wilson's visit around 1859.

== Murthly Castle ==
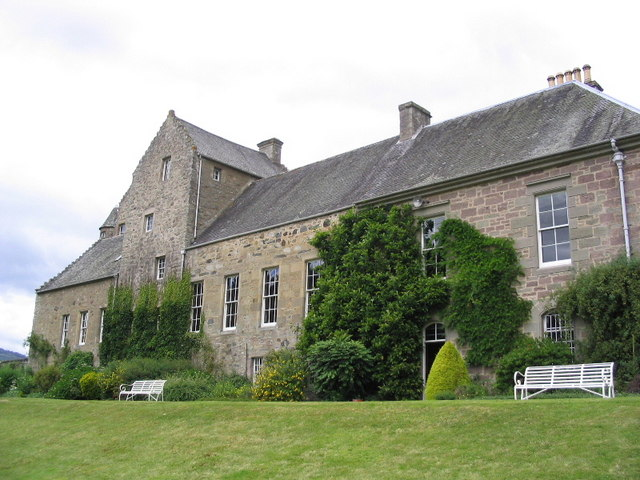
Murthly Castle

Dating from the 15th century, Murthly Castle (56.5416°N 3.5113°W) is 1 3/4 miles (3 kilometres) west of the village centre. An ambitious 19th-century replacement castle, Murthly House, was commissioned by Sir John Drummond Stewart, 6th baronet in 1827, with James Gillespie Graham as its architect. It was, however, never finished and was demolished in 1949, never having been wholly occupied. Within the castle grounds is the Chapel of St Anthony the Eremite, a Catholic chapel designed by James Gillespie Graham and A. W. N. Pugin in 1846, attached to an earlier 16th-century chapel. Carving in the castle and the chapel was done by Patric Park, then aged only 17.
