= Kenneth Macleay (painter) =

Scottish miniature painter

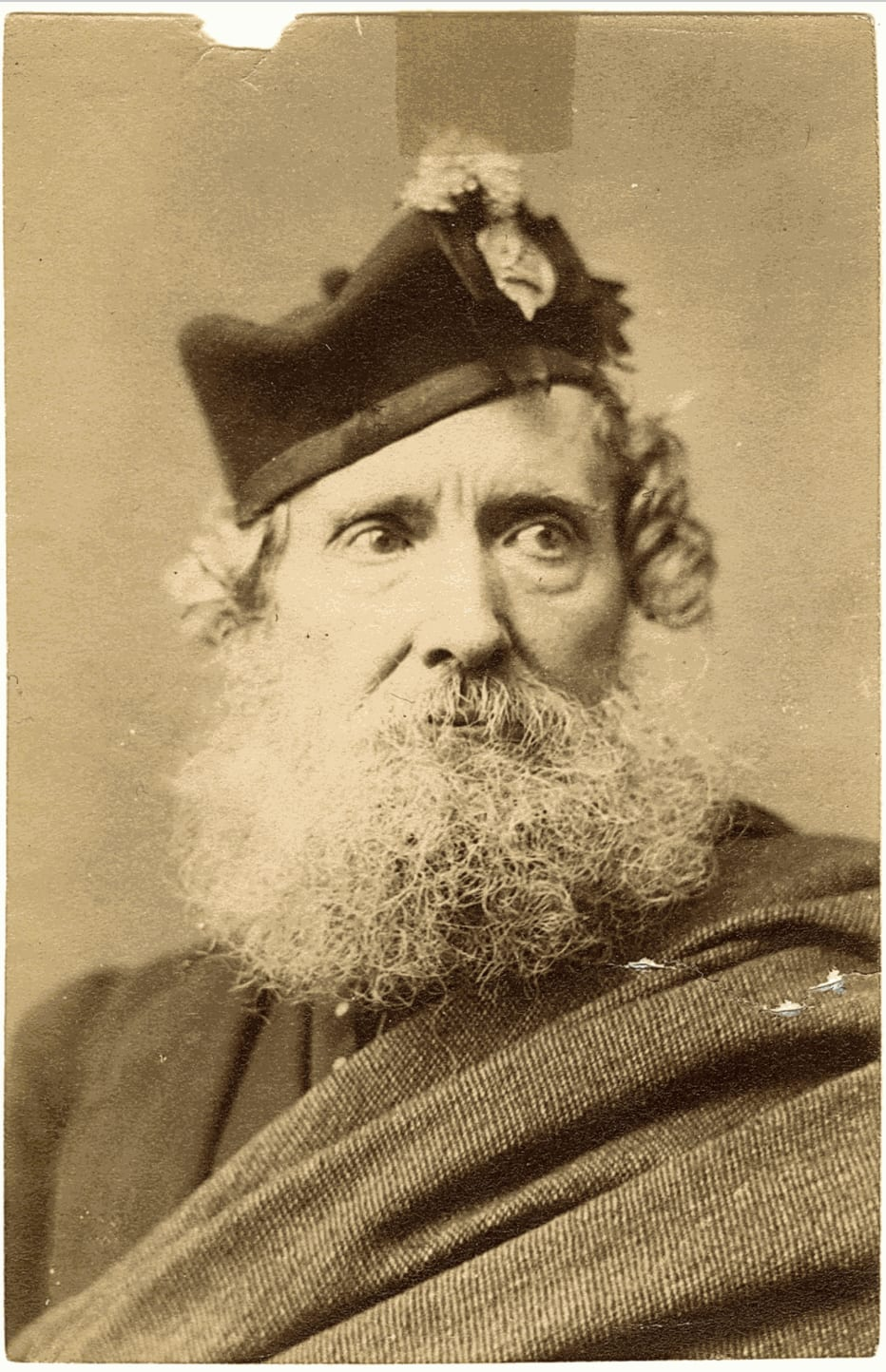
- Born: 4 July 1802; Oban, Scotland
- Died: 3 November 1878 (aged 76); Edinburgh, Scotland
- Occupation: Miniature painter

Kenneth Macleay the younger (4 July 1802 – 3 November 1878) was a Scottish miniature painter. He was the son of Kenneth Macleay the elder.

== Biography ==
Macleay was born at Oban on 4 July 1802. He was the son of Dr. Kenneth Macleay; his mother belonged to the Macdonald family of Keppoch, Inverness-shire. His early years were spent at Crieff. At the age of eighteen, he came to Edinburgh; and on 26 February 1822 entered the Trustees' Academy (minute-book of the board of trustees). He soon attained repute as a miniature-painter, and was one of the original members of the Royal Scottish Academy founded in 1826. At first he worked on ivory, afterwards in water-colours on paper. His bust portraits and small full-lengths are distinguished by exquisite beauty of touch and fine colouring. Among his earlier works was a small full-length of Helen Faucit, which attracted much attention and has been lithographed. He executed for the queen a series of full-length figures illustrative of the costumes of the highland clans, including portraits of the prince consort, the Duke of Edinburgh, and several members of the royal household at Balmoral. A selection of these were lithographed, hand-coloured, and published in two volumes in 1870, under the title of 'Highlanders of Scotland,' When the progress of photography reduced the popular demand for miniatures, Macleay turned his attention to oil-painting, and produced a few genre pictures of highland subjects and many landscapes. These are very hard and minute in handling, and greatly inferior to his earlier water-colour portraits. He married a daughter of Sir A. Campbell of Aldenglass. He died in Edinburgh on 3 November 1878.

== Gallery ==
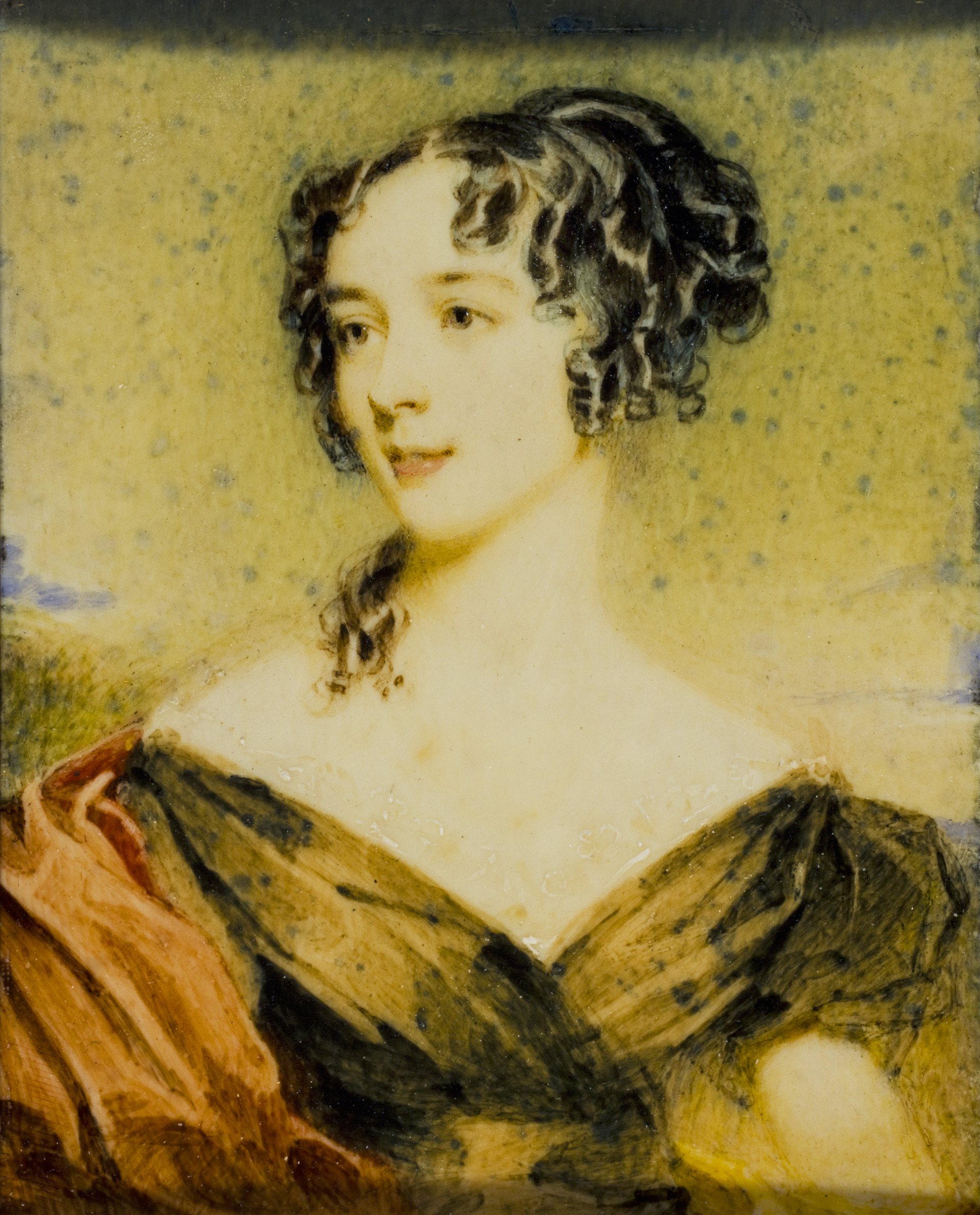
Jane Carlyle

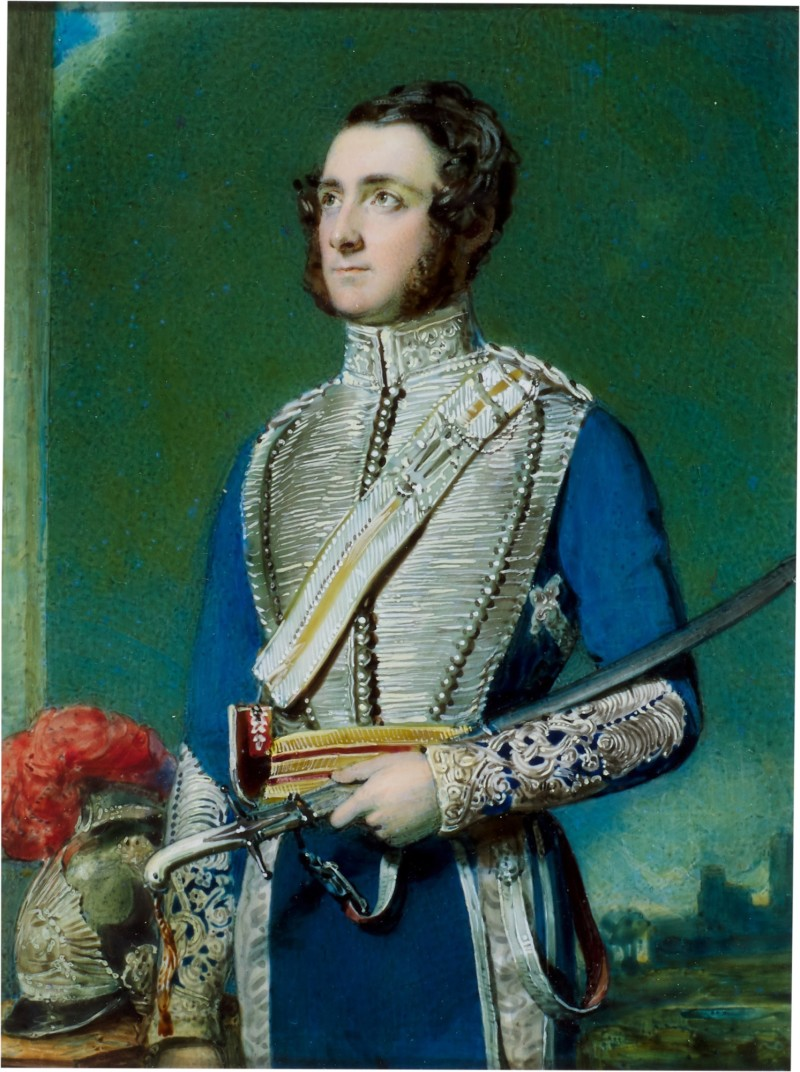
John Neil Dyce

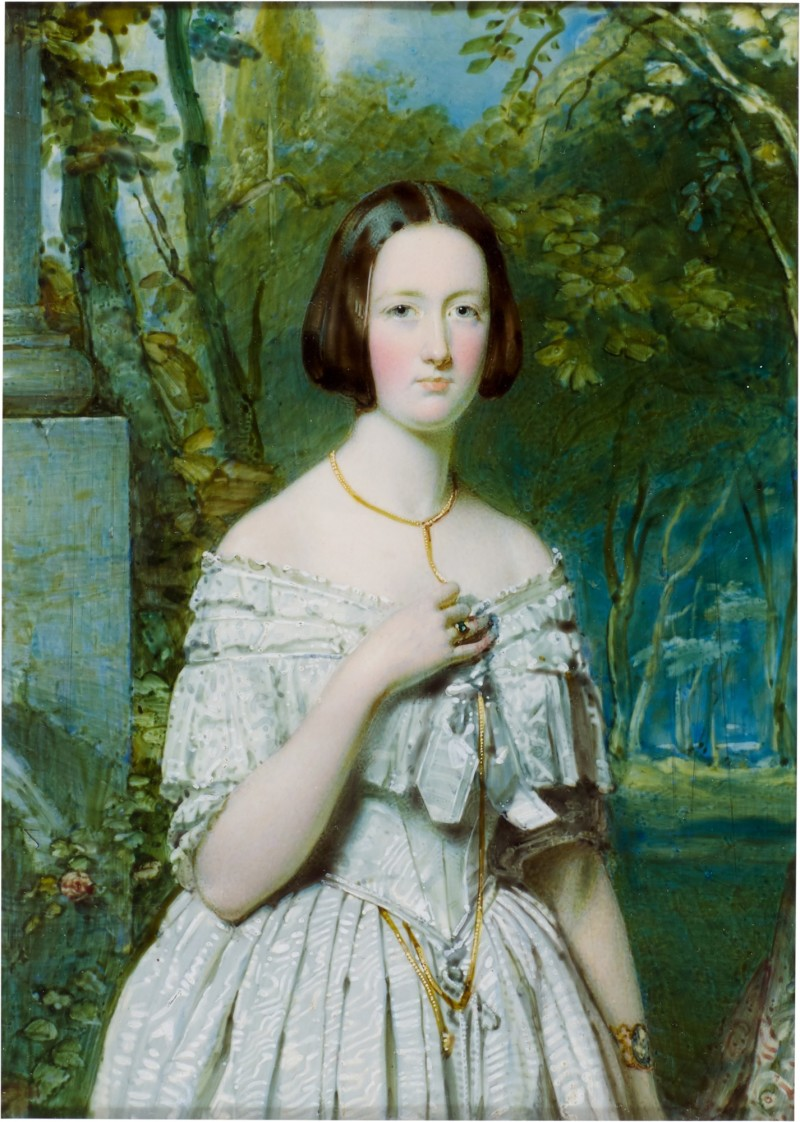
Elizabeth Hamilton Bowie

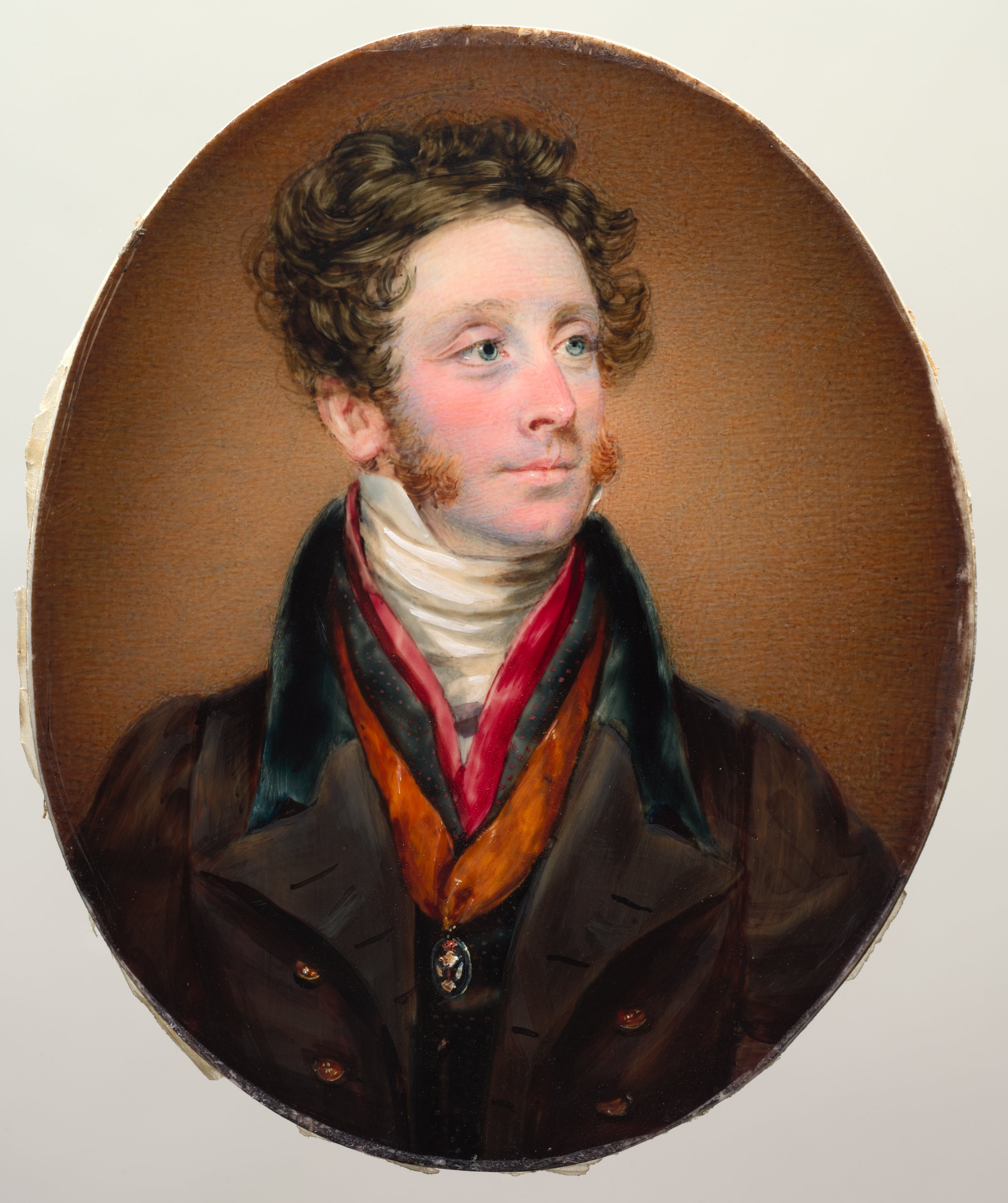
John Francis Miller Erskine

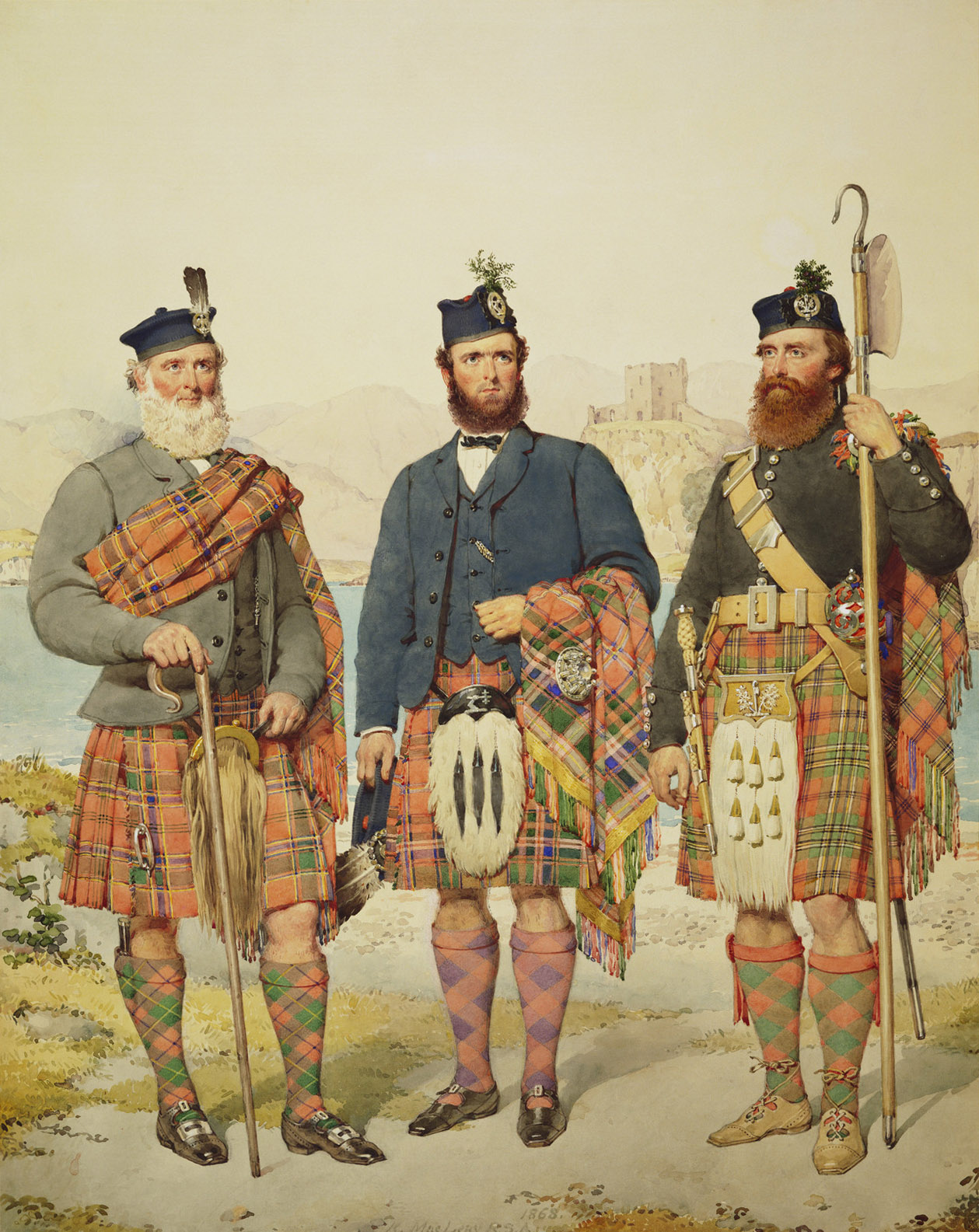
Donald Munro, Archibald MacDougall and Lachlan MacLean
