= Craigvinean Forest =

Forest in Scotland

Coordinates: 56.560°N 3.618°W

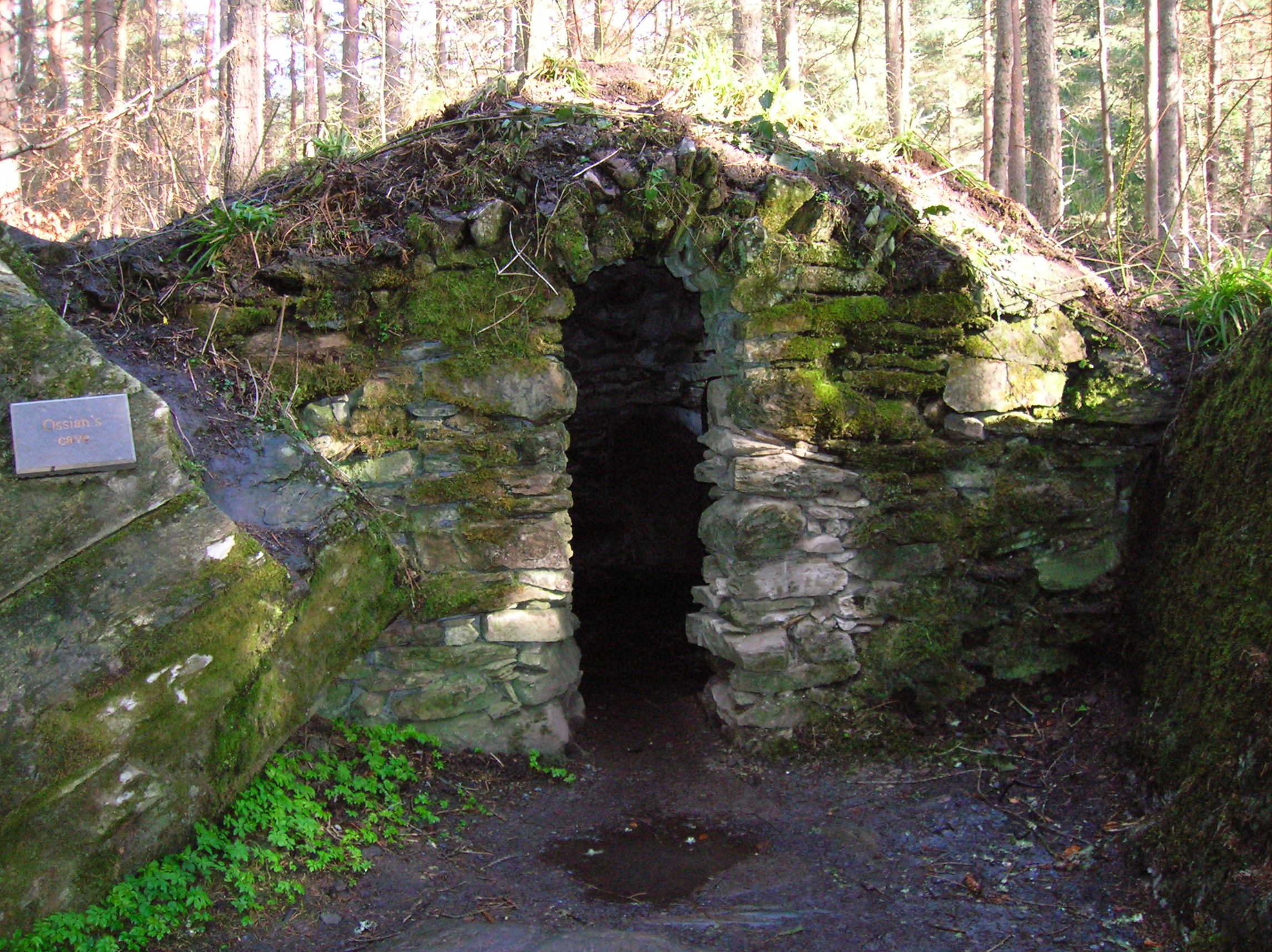
Ossian's Cave, at The Hermitage

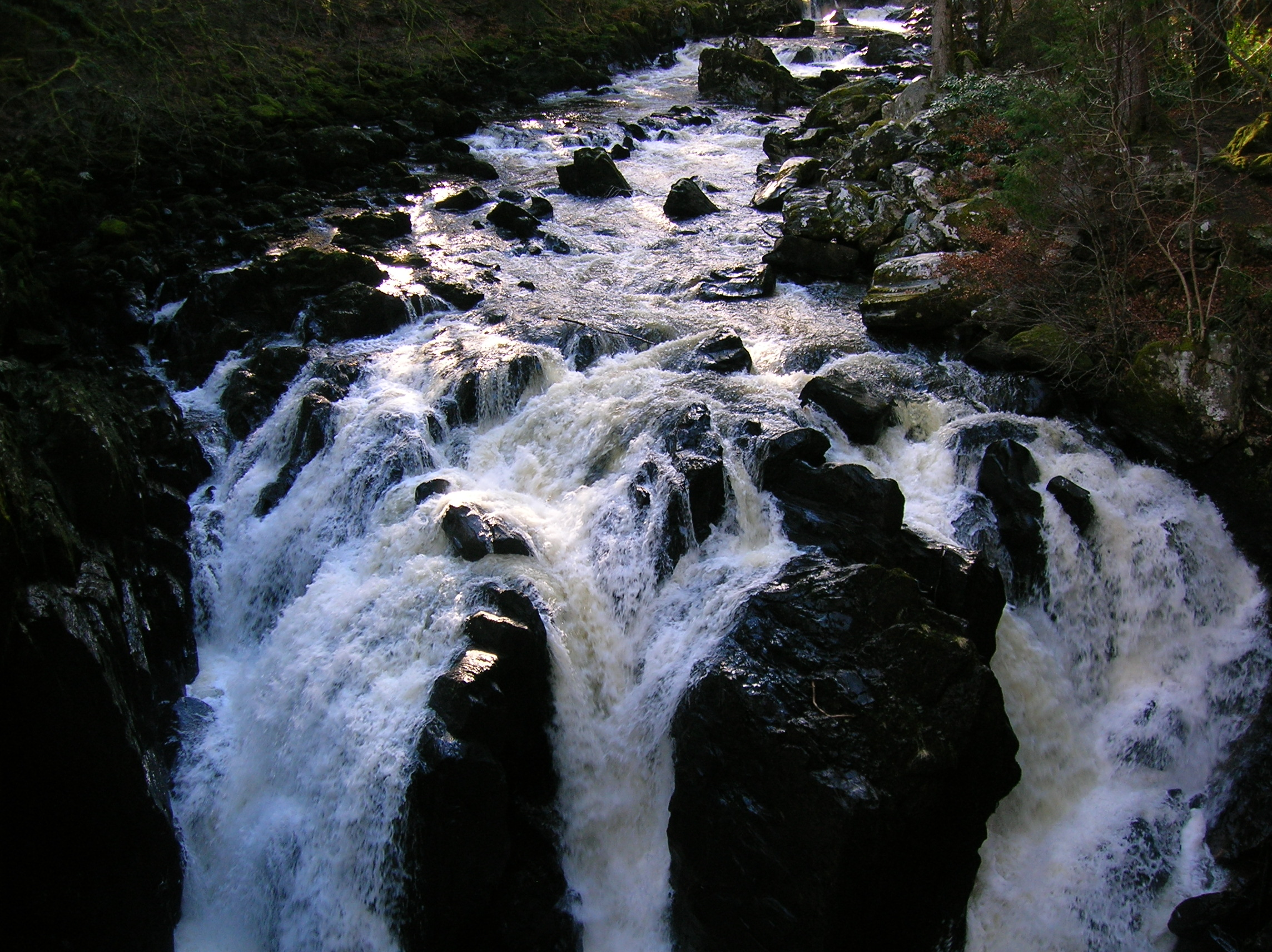
The River Braan, at The Hermitage.

Craigvinean Forest is located 1 mile (1.6 km) west of Dunkeld, Perth and Kinross, Scotland, on the A9. It is accessed through a track at the foot of Deuchary Hill. The River Braan bisects the forest, which forms part of the Tay Forest Park, one of six forest park in Scotland.

The Hermitage is located in a section of the forest.

Ossian, a third-century Celtic bard, whose mother was turned into a deer by Fer Doirich, is said to have inhabited a cave which can be found on the north bank of the Braan located upstream from Ossian's Hall of Mirrors, a folly built in 1758 which is replete with Corinthian architrave and cornice. This folly was built on a horse shoe plan facing a waterfall and so amplifies the roaring sound of water.

The 2019 racing game Dirt Rally 2.0 features point-to-point stages based on accurate reproductions of around 25 km (16 mi) of forestry tracks within Craigvinean.
