= List of listed buildings in Little Dunkeld, Perth and Kinross =

This is a list of listed buildings in the parish of Little Dunkeld in Perth and Kinross, Scotland.

== List ==
Name	Location	Date listed	Geo-coordinates	Notes	Category	LB number	Image
Elsey Cottage, Birnam			56°33′21″N 3°34′45″W		C(S)	13733	Upload Photo
Neil Gow's Cottage, Inver			56°33′42″N 3°36′10″W		B	11163	Upload Photo
Merryburn Hotel, Station Road, Birnam			56°33′27″N 3°34′38″W		C(S)	11082	Upload another image
Birnam Terrace, Birnam			56°33′28″N 3°34′37″W		C(S)	11083	Upload Photo
Thomas Ormsby And Mary Newham Underwood, Fountain, Birnam			56°33′32″N 3°34′38″W		C(S)	11088	Upload Photo
Oransay, Oak Road, Birnam			56°33′38″N 3°34′37″W		C(S)	11090	Upload Photo
The Rectory, Oak Road, Birnam			56°33′31″N 3°34′32″W		C(S)	11091	Upload Photo
Inver, K6 Telephone Kiosk At Inver Square			56°33′41″N 3°36′06″W		B	11103	Upload another image See more images
Hermitage Bridge Over R. Braan			56°33′26″N 3°36′51″W		A	11104	Upload another image See more images
Newton Bridge Over R. Braan			56°32′45″N 3°39′43″W		B	11108	Upload Photo
Dalguise Church			56°36′12″N 3°38′29″W		B	11113	Upload Photo
Dalguise House, Column			56°36′39″N 3°38′43″W		B	11115	Upload Photo
Kinnaird House			56°37′49″N 3°39′36″W		B	11118	Upload Photo
Murthly Terrace (All Except Mcmurray At No 1) And Glen Afric, Perth Road, Birnam			56°33′32″N 3°34′37″W		B	11125	Upload Photo
Stair Bridge, Rohallion Over Birnam Burn			56°32′11″N 3°33′58″W		C(S)	11142	Upload Photo
Walled Garden, Garden House, Gatepiers On E., Steps, Urns, Etc. On East Of Castle			56°32′28″N 3°30′38″W		A	11147	Upload Photo
Colryden Lodge, Murthly			56°31′58″N 3°31′22″W		B	11148	Upload another image
Dalguise House			56°36′40″N 3°38′43″W		B	13734	Upload Photo
Bridge Over Birnam Burn To S. Of Roman Bridge			56°32′17″N 3°32′05″W		C(S)	13737	Upload Photo
East Gates, Near Gellyburn			56°32′15″N 3°28′35″W		C(S)	11150	Upload another image
Ossian's Cave			56°33′21″N 3°37′12″W		B	11105	Upload another image See more images
Amulree Bridge			56°30′37″N 3°47′18″W		B	11123	Upload another image See more images
The School House, Perth Road, Birnam			56°33′28″N 3°34′32″W		C(S)	11130	Upload Photo
Dunkeld and Birnam railway station			56°33′25″N 3°34′42″W		A	11139	Upload another image See more images
Bee Cottage, Pass Of Birnam			56°32′06″N 3°32′31″W		B	11144	Upload Photo
Murthly Castle			56°32′20″N 3°30′47″W		A	11146	Upload another image See more images
Sawmill, Byres Of Murthly			56°31′58″N 3°32′09″W		B	11149	Upload Photo
Murthly Asylum, Administrative Block			56°31′54″N 3°27′51″W		C(S)	11155	Upload Photo
Nursery Cottage, Little Dunkeld			56°33′44″N 3°35′06″W		C(S)	11160	Upload another image
Bheine Mhor, Perth Road Birnam			56°33′27″N 3°34′31″W		C(S)	11080	Upload Photo
Craigielea And Dunsville, Gladstone Terrace, Birnam			56°33′26″N 3°34′34″W		C(S)	11084	Upload Photo
Dunaird House, Torr Hill, Birnam			56°33′30″N 3°34′24″W		B	11094	Upload Photo
Lagganallachy Grave Yard			56°33′01″N 3°38′34″W		C(S)	11107	Upload Photo
Dalguise Railway Viaduct Over R. Tay			56°36′45″N 3°38′21″W		A	11117	Upload another image See more images
Inver Square			56°33′41″N 3°36′08″W		B	11133	Upload Photo
Roman Bridge, Over Birnam Burn			56°32′18″N 3°32′06″W		A	11145	Upload another image
Murthly Castle Policies, Fountain At East Lodge Fishing Hut			56°32′16″N 3°29′24″W		C(S)	50824	Upload Photo
Robertson And Jamieson, Inver			56°33′41″N 3°36′05″W		C(S)	13736	Upload Photo
Ossian's Hall of Mirrors, The Hermitage			56°33′27″N 3°36′52″W		B	11156	Upload another image See more images
Lagbeag, Little Dunkeld			56°33′43″N 3°35′10″W		C(S)	11161	Upload Photo
Birnam Glen Tuck Shop And Lindisfarne, Birnam			56°33′33″N 3°34′43″W		C(S)	11085	Upload Photo
Birchwood House, Torr Hill, Birnam			56°33′25″N 3°34′21″W		B	11095	Upload Photo
Ballinloan Bridge Over Ballinloan Burn			56°32′44″N 3°40′15″W		B	11109	Upload Photo
Aldmad Bridge Over R. Braan			56°31′32″N 3°43′35″W		B	11111	Upload Photo
Balnamuir Cottage And Toll House			56°38′40″N 3°41′06″W		C(S)	11120	Upload Photo
1 Murthly Terrace (Mcmurray) Birnam			56°33′32″N 3°34′37″W		C(S)	11124	Upload Photo
The Bungalow, Perth Road, Birnam			56°33′29″N 3°34′35″W		C(S)	11128	Upload Photo
2 Vacant Cottages East Of Inver Square			56°33′41″N 3°36′05″W		C(S)	11132	Upload Photo
Todd And Chalmers, Inver			56°33′40″N 3°36′06″W		C(S)	11134	Upload Photo
Inver Bridge Over River Braan			56°33′37″N 3°35′59″W		B	11136	Upload another image See more images
Railway Bridge Over Hermitage Road, With Tunnel Entrance Above			56°33′39″N 3°36′31″W		C(S)	11138	Upload another image
Rohallion Lodge			56°32′00″N 3°33′21″W		B	11143	Upload Photo
Murthly Castle Policies, East Lodge Fishing Hut			56°32′16″N 3°29′23″W		C(S)	50823	Upload Photo
Eastern Terrace Block (Miss Isobella Lawrence And Miss S M Harvey's Property) Gladstone Terrace, Birnam			56°33′25″N 3°34′31″W		C(S)	13732	Upload Photo
Chapel Of St Anthony The Eremite, Murthly			56°32′36″N 3°30′43″W		A	13460	Upload another image See more images
Lantern Lodge, Murthly			56°32′14″N 3°29′20″W		B	11151	Upload Photo
The Lodge, Birnam			56°33′22″N 3°34′42″W		B	11100	Upload Photo
Craigmore			56°33′20″N 3°34′34″W		B	11102	Upload Photo
Balmacneil Farm			56°38′10″N 3°39′55″W		C(S)	11119	Upload Photo
Balnaguard Limekiln			56°38′43″N 3°43′12″W		C(S)	11122	Upload Photo
Tower Buildings, Perth Road And Station Road, Birnam			56°33′30″N 3°34′37″W		B	11127	Upload another image
Clunie, Inver			56°33′39″N 3°36′05″W		C(S)	11135	Upload Photo
Rohallion, Buffalo Hut			56°32′28″N 3°33′20″W		B	50775	Upload another image
Upper Kinnaird			56°37′36″N 3°39′41″W		B	13735	Upload Photo
Manse, Little Dunkeld			56°33′45″N 3°35′14″W		C(S)	11162	Upload Photo
Parkview, Station Road, Birnam			56°33′28″N 3°34′37″W		C(S)	11081	Upload Photo
Java, Birnam			56°33′32″N 3°34′44″W		C(S)	11087	Upload Photo
Tayview, Oak Road, Birnam			56°33′40″N 3°34′36″W		C(S)	11092	Upload Photo
Erigmore, Torr Hill, Birnam			56°33′24″N 3°34′13″W		B	11097	Upload Photo
Oakbank, Birnam			56°33′21″N 3°34′38″W		C(S)	11101	Upload Photo
Rumbling Bridge, Over Falls Of The Braan			56°33′08″N 3°38′02″W		C(S)	11106	Upload another image
Trochry Mill			56°32′27″N 3°39′52″W		C(S)	11110	Upload Photo
Bridge At Glenfender Cottage Over Glenfender Burn			56°31′14″N 3°45′38″W		C(S)	11112	Upload Photo
Macbeth Cottage, Perth Road, Birnam			56°33′23″N 3°34′23″W		B	11126	Upload Photo
Birnam Hotel, Adjoining Gates And Annexe			56°33′34″N 3°34′40″W		B	11140	Upload another image See more images
St. Mary's Episcopal Church, Birnam			56°33′30″N 3°34′33″W		B	11141	Upload another image
Murthly Signal Box			56°31′43″N 3°27′47″W		B	43644	Upload another image
Bradyston, Murthly			56°31′42″N 3°28′31″W		B	11152	Upload Photo
Ardoch, Farmhouse			56°31′22″N 3°27′57″W		B	11153	Upload Photo
Ardoch, Steading			56°31′22″N 3°27′55″W		C(S)	11154	Upload Photo
Little Dunkeld Parish Church			56°33′44″N 3°34′56″W		B	11157	Upload another image See more images
Little Dunkeld Churchyard			56°33′44″N 3°34′56″W		C(S)	11158	Upload another image
Dunkeld Bridge Toll House, Little Dunkeld			56°33′47″N 3°35′06″W		B	11159	Upload another image
Ladywell Cottages, Birnam			56°33′33″N 3°34′44″W		C(S)	11086	Upload another image
Torwood House, St Mary's Road, Torr Hill, Birnam			56°33′34″N 3°34′33″W		B	11093	Upload Photo
Ladyhill House And Outbuildings, St Mary's Road, Torr Hill, Birnam			56°33′31″N 3°34′19″W		B	11096	Upload Photo
Drill Hall (Armoury House), Perth Road, Birnam			56°33′28″N 3°34′34″W		B	11129	Upload Photo
Inver Railway Viaduct Over River Braan			56°33′38″N 3°36′28″W		B	11137	Upload another image
Rohallion, Cistern And Wellhead			56°32′11″N 3°33′51″W		C(S)	50776	Upload Photo
Scott And Gow, Inver			56°33′43″N 3°36′06″W		C(S)	11164	Upload Photo
Guthrie Villas Nos 1 And 2, Oak Road/St Mary's Road, Birnam			56°33′33″N 3°34′36″W		C(S)	11089	Upload Photo
Birnam Bank House, Birnam			56°33′23″N 3°34′45″W		C(S)	11098	Upload Photo
Birnam Bank Cottage, Birnam			56°33′22″N 3°34′46″W		C(S)	11099	Upload Photo
Charleston, Dalguise			56°36′29″N 3°38′37″W		B	11114	Upload another image
Dalguise House, Stables			56°36′36″N 3°38′43″W		B	11116	Upload Photo
Balnaguard Inn			56°38′46″N 3°43′10″W		B	11121	Upload Photo
Cattenach, Inver			56°33′42″N 3°36′07″W		C(S)	11131	Upload Photo

== Key ==
The scheme for classifying buildings in Scotland is:

- Category A: "buildings of national or international importance, either architectural or historic; or fine, little-altered examples of some particular period, style or building type."
- Category B: "buildings of regional or more than local importance; or major examples of some particular period, style or building type, which may have been altered."
- Category C: "buildings of local importance; lesser examples of any period, style, or building type, as originally constructed or moderately altered; and simple traditional buildings which group well with other listed buildings."

In March 2016 there were 47,288 listed buildings in Scotland. Of these, 8% were Category A, and 50% were Category B, with the remaining 42% being Category C.
