= Hermitage Bridge (Dunkeld, Scotland) =

Stone bridge in Perth and Kinross, Scotland

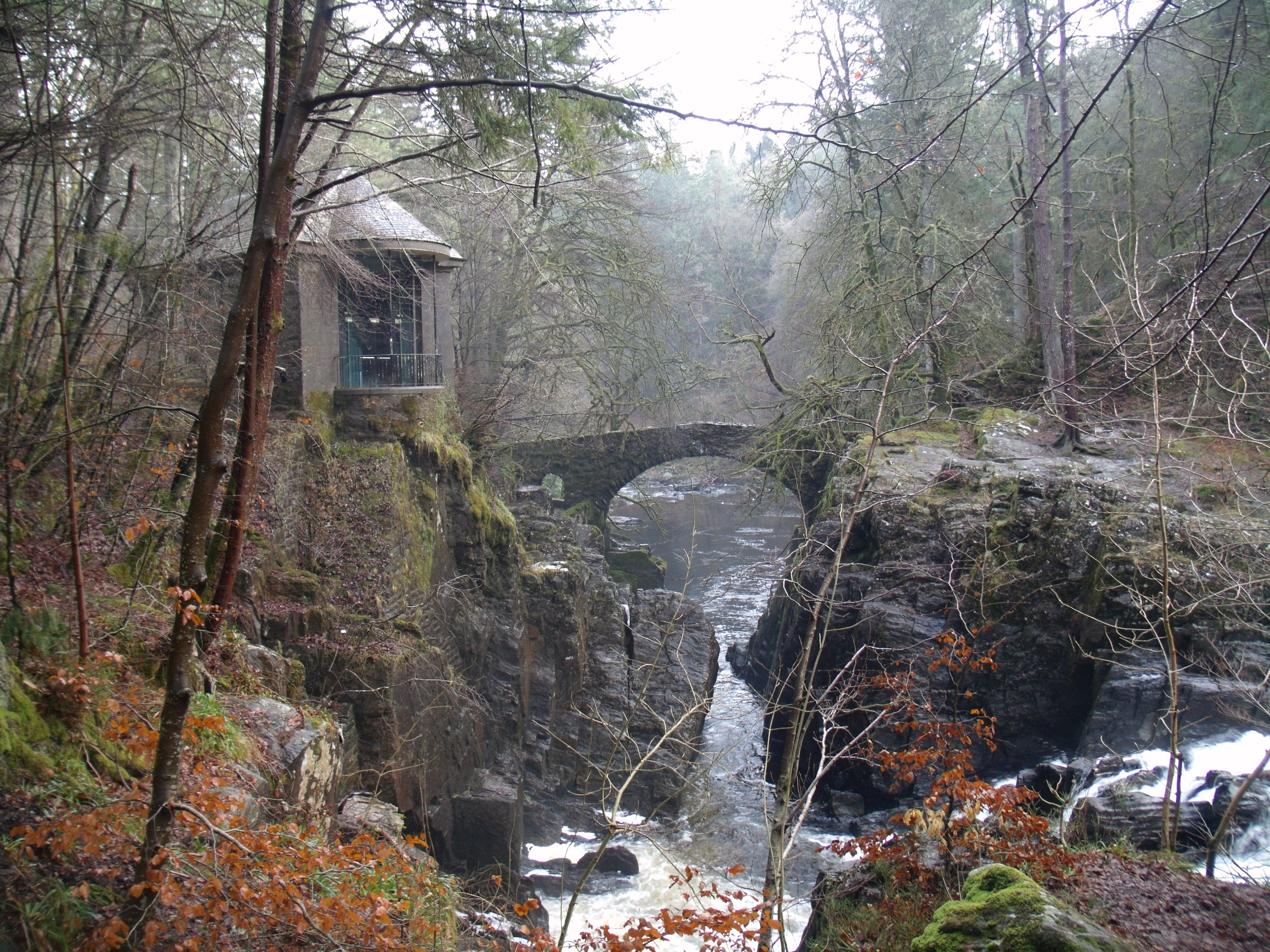
- The bridge crossing the River Braan, with Ossian's Hall of Mirrors on the left, in 2012
- Coordinates: 56.5574352°N 3.6143987°W
- Crosses: River Braan
- Locale: Perth and Kinross

History
- Opened: 1770 (256 years ago)

Listed Building – Category A
- Official name: Hermitage Bridge Over R. Braan
- Designated: 4 October 1971
- Reference no.: LB11104

Location
- Interactive map of Hermitage Bridge

The Hermitage Bridge is an old, single-arch stone pedestrian bridge crossing the River Braan near Dunkeld, Perth and Kinross, Scotland. A Category A listed structure, it is in the bounds of The Hermitage, a National Trust for Scotland-protected site. The bridge should not be confused with the Rumbling Bridge, which carries motorised traffic, about 0.62 miles (1.00 km) to the southwest.

The bridge was built in 1770 by order of John Murray, 3rd Duke of Atholl, presumably to gain access across to some lands leased from Sir John Stewart of Murthly, as well as assisting with the views of the Black Linn Falls. It has since become a major landscape feature and has been the subject of several paintings and sketches, including from George Washington Wilson's visit around 1859.

An arch (added around 1785) stands across the western entrance, while underneath its eastern end, the bridge contains a small arch giving access to the ledge below Ossian’s Hall and to a small grotto.

== Gallery ==
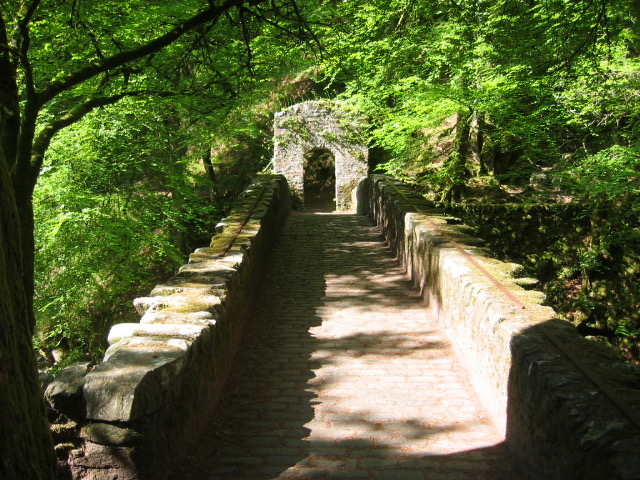
The bridge from its western end

== See also ==
- List of listed buildings in Dunkeld And Dowally, Perth and Kinross
- List of bridges in Scotland
