= The Hermitage, Dunkeld =

National Trust for Scotland-protected forest

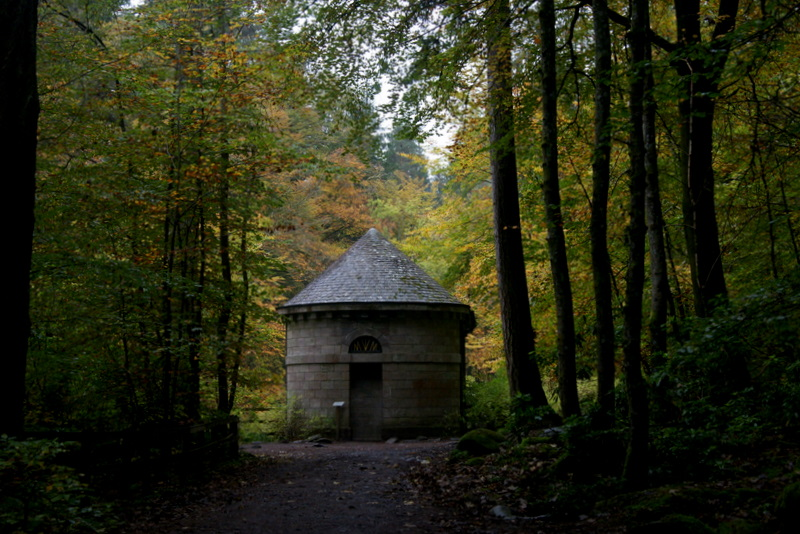
- Ossian's Hall at the Hermitage

- Location within Scotland
- Interactive map of The Hermitage, Dunkeld

Geography
- Location: Perth and Kinross, Scotland
- Coordinates: 56.559°N 3.621°W

Designations

Inventory of Gardens and Designed Landscapes in Scotland
- Official name: The Hermitage
- Designated: 30 June 1987
- Reference no.: GDL00363

The Hermitage (officially The Hermitage pleasure ground) is a National Trust for Scotland-protected site in Dunkeld, Perth and Kinross. Located just to the west of the A9, it sits on the banks of the River Braan in Craigvinean Forest.

== Origin ==
It was created by John Murray, the third Duke of Atholl, who lived in nearby Dunkeld House (demolished in the early 19th century), in the 18th century to honour the blind bard Ossian.

== Features ==
It is home to the Georgian follies Ossian's Hall of Mirrors and Ossian's Cave. The hermit's cave was built around 1760 for the third Earl of Breadalbane, who unsuccessfully advertised for a permanent eremite. The guide in 1869, Donald Anderson, dressed up with a long beard of lichens and clothes of animal skins.

Also in its grounds are several Douglas-fir trees, one of which was the second tree (after a grand fir in Argyll) in Britain to reach 200 feet (61 m) in height, in 1980. Known as the Hermitage Douglas-fir, it eventually reached a height of 63 metres (207 ft) in 2009 before it was blown over due to high winds in the early hours of 13 January 2017. It was a self-sown tree, growing from seed blown from one of three older trees at the Hermitage, and was found by increment boring to have germinated around 1887.

== Walks ==
Visitors to the site can undertake various walks. The most popular walk is the 0.6 miles (1 km)-long journey to Ossian's Hall. Wheelchairs are accommodated via a pass-for-all route. There is also a link to a thirty-mile network of footpaths beyond The Hermitage to various parts of Dunkeld. These paths date back to the 18th century.

Originally, the popular riverside path purposely deviated away from the river at about a half-mile from the car park. This was to build up the visitors' anticipation for the waterfall (the Black Linn Falls) that is to be found a short distance ahead. Another path, running parallel to the riverside path, is wider, the purpose for which, it is believed, was to accommodate horse-drawn carriages. Hermitage Bridge, dating from 1770, is located nearby. Standing next to it, and appearing to be growing out of it, is a Cedar of Lebanon, which is believed to be the oldest tree at The Hermitage.

== Hermitage Bridge ==
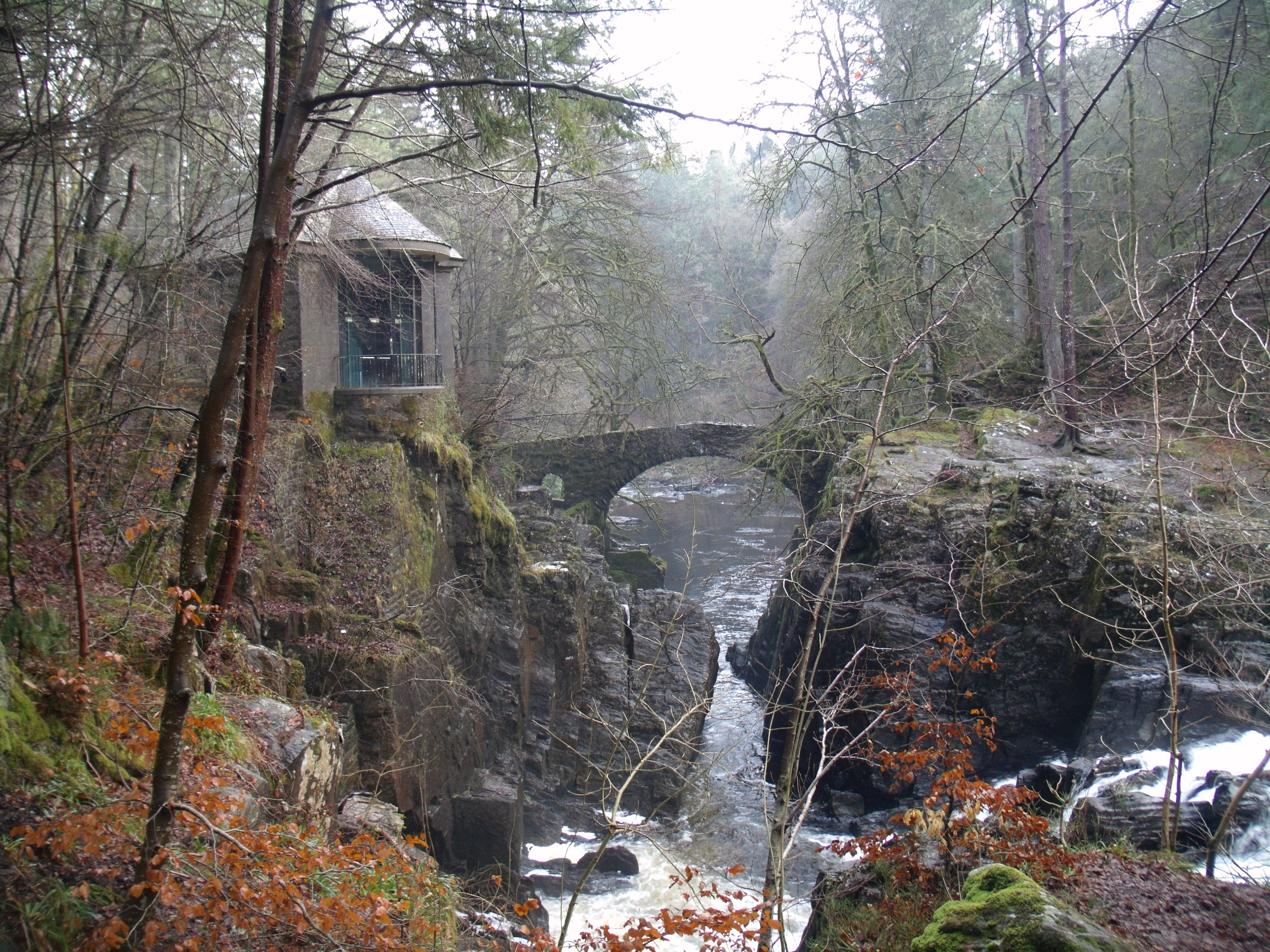
Hermitage Bridge, with Ossian's Hall of Mirrors on the left, in 2012

== Views of Ossian's Cave and Craigvinean Forest ==
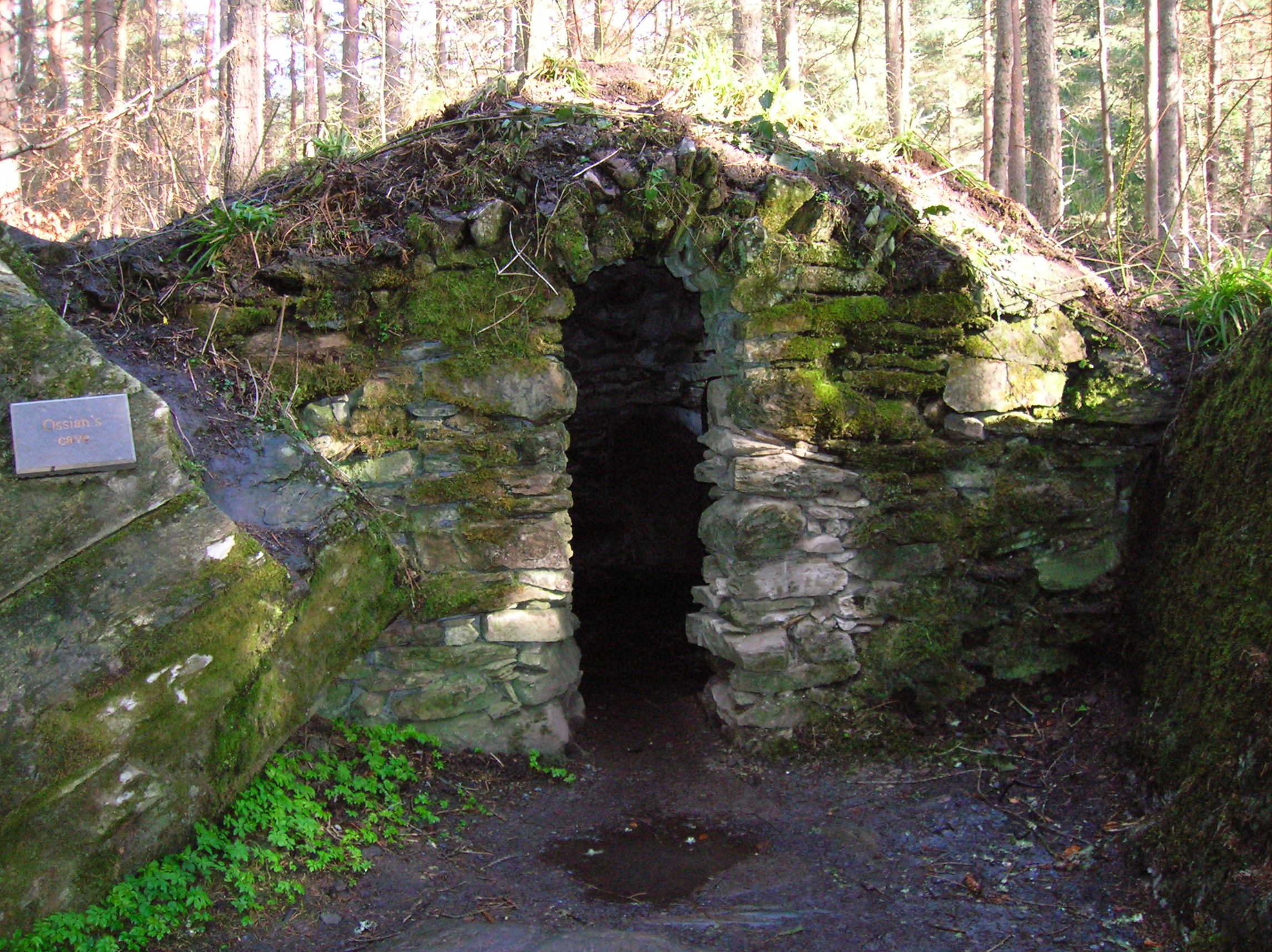
The entrance to Ossian's Cave

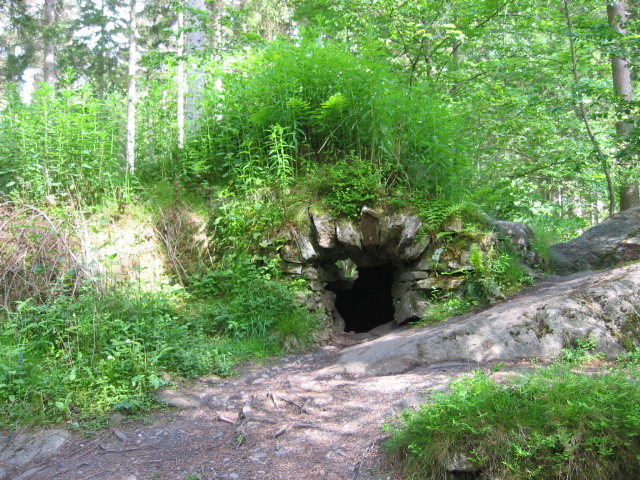
The rear of Ossian's Cave

== Ossian's Hall ==
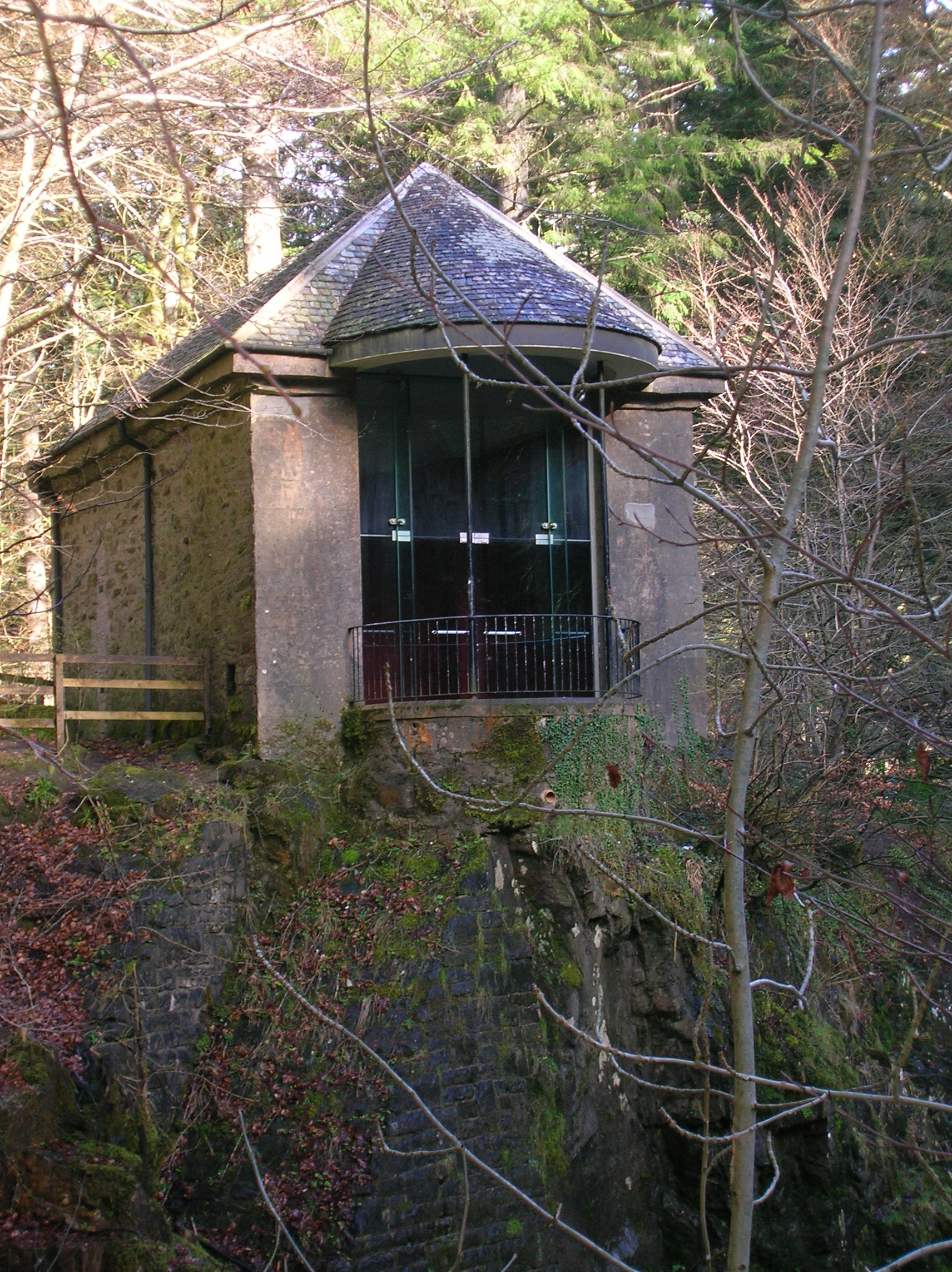
Ossian's Hall

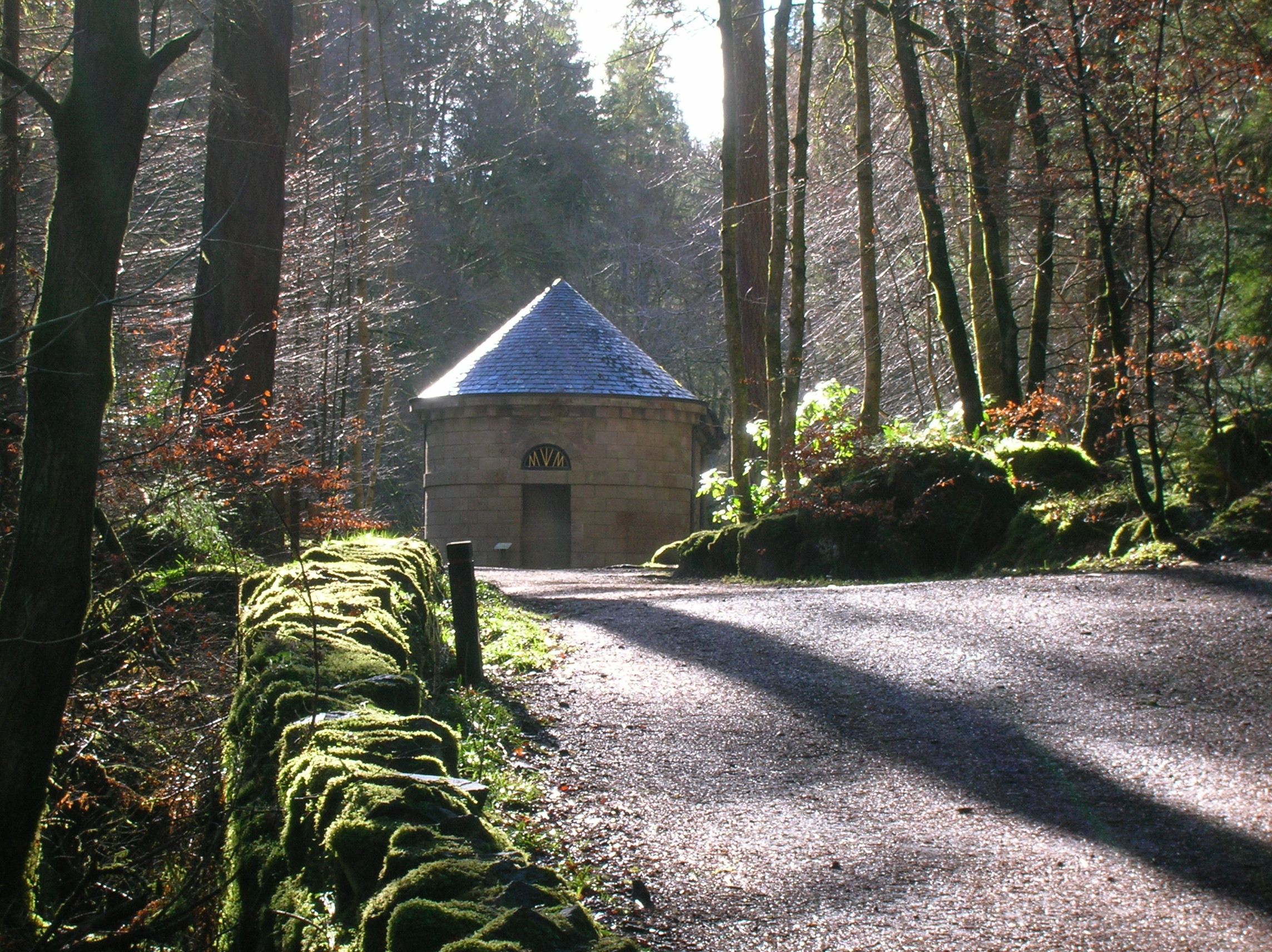
The path up to Ossian's Hall

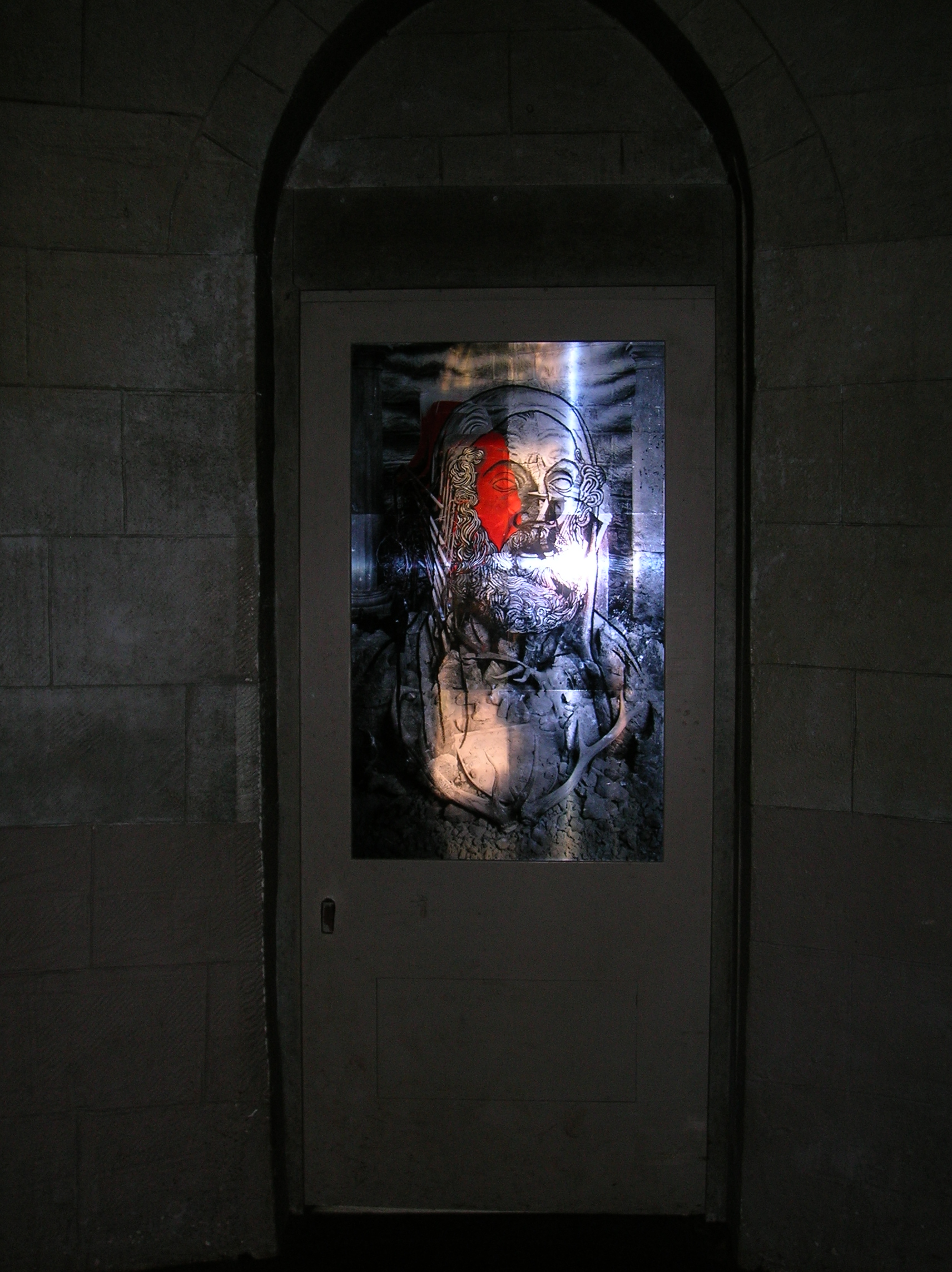
An image of Ossian on an internal door
