= Hermitage Douglas-fir =

Douglas-fir tree in Dunkeld, Scotland

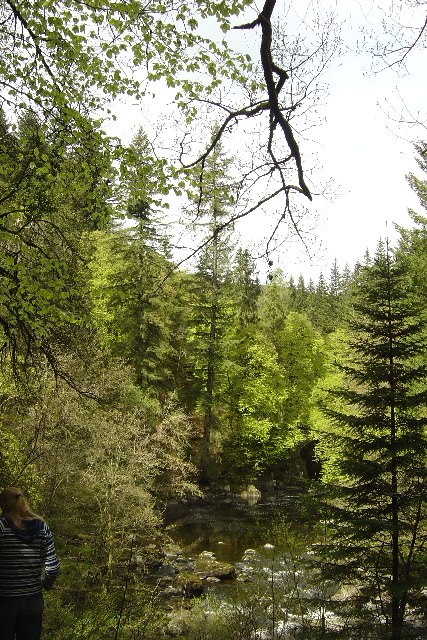
- The tree (centre) in 2004

- Location within Scotland
- Species: Douglas-fir (Pseudotsuga menziesii)
- Coordinates: 56.559°N 3.621°W
- Height: 201.1 ft (61.3 m)
- Date seeded: c. 1887
- Date felled: 13 January 2017

The Hermitage Douglas-fir (also known as Ossian's Douglas-fir) was a Douglas-fir tree which stood in The Hermitage pleasure ground, in Dunkeld, Scotland, between c. 1887 and 2017.

It was the second tree (after a grand fir in Argyll) in Britain to reach 200 feet (61 m) in height, in 1980. It eventually reached a height of 63 metres (207 ft) in 2009 before it was blown over due to high winds in the early hours of 13 January 2017. It was a self-sown tree, growing from seed blown from one of three older trees at the Hermitage, and was found by increment boring to have germinated around 1887.

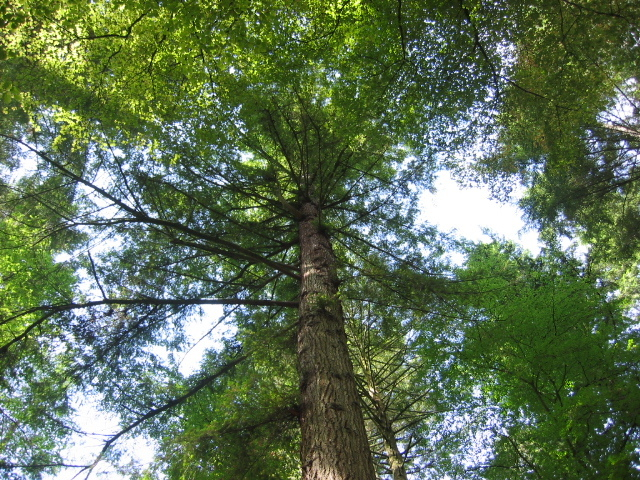
Looking up the trunk of the Hermitage Douglas-fir

== See also ==
- List of individual trees
