= Black Linn Falls =

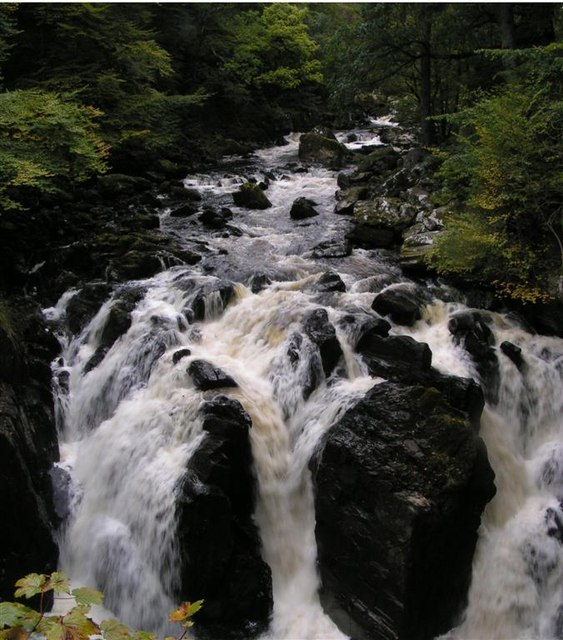
- Looking west up the River Braan from the falls

- Location within Perth and Kinross Location within Scotland
- Location: The Hermitage, Dunkeld, Scotland
- Coordinates: 56.5573188°N 3.615173°W
- Number of drops: 1
- Watercourse: River Braan

Black Linn Falls is a waterfall on the River Braan in The Hermitage, Dunkeld, Scotland. After the falls, the river passes beneath the Hermitage Bridge into a plunge pool.

Ossian's Hall of Mirrors is a popular viewing point of the falls.

== Aerial view ==
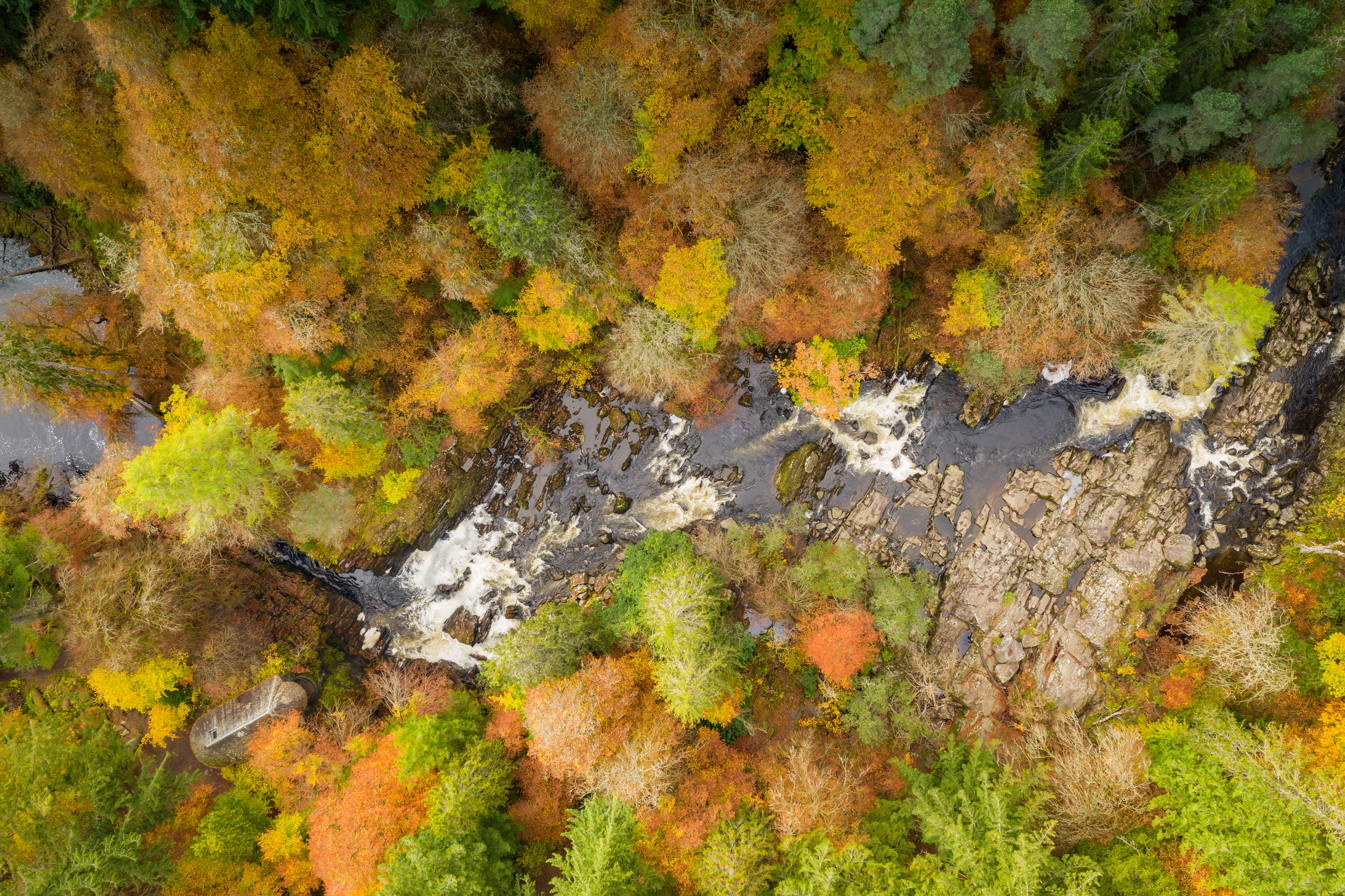
Drone shot of the falls, with Ossian's Hall of Mirrors on the left

== Ossian's Hall of Mirrors viewing point ==
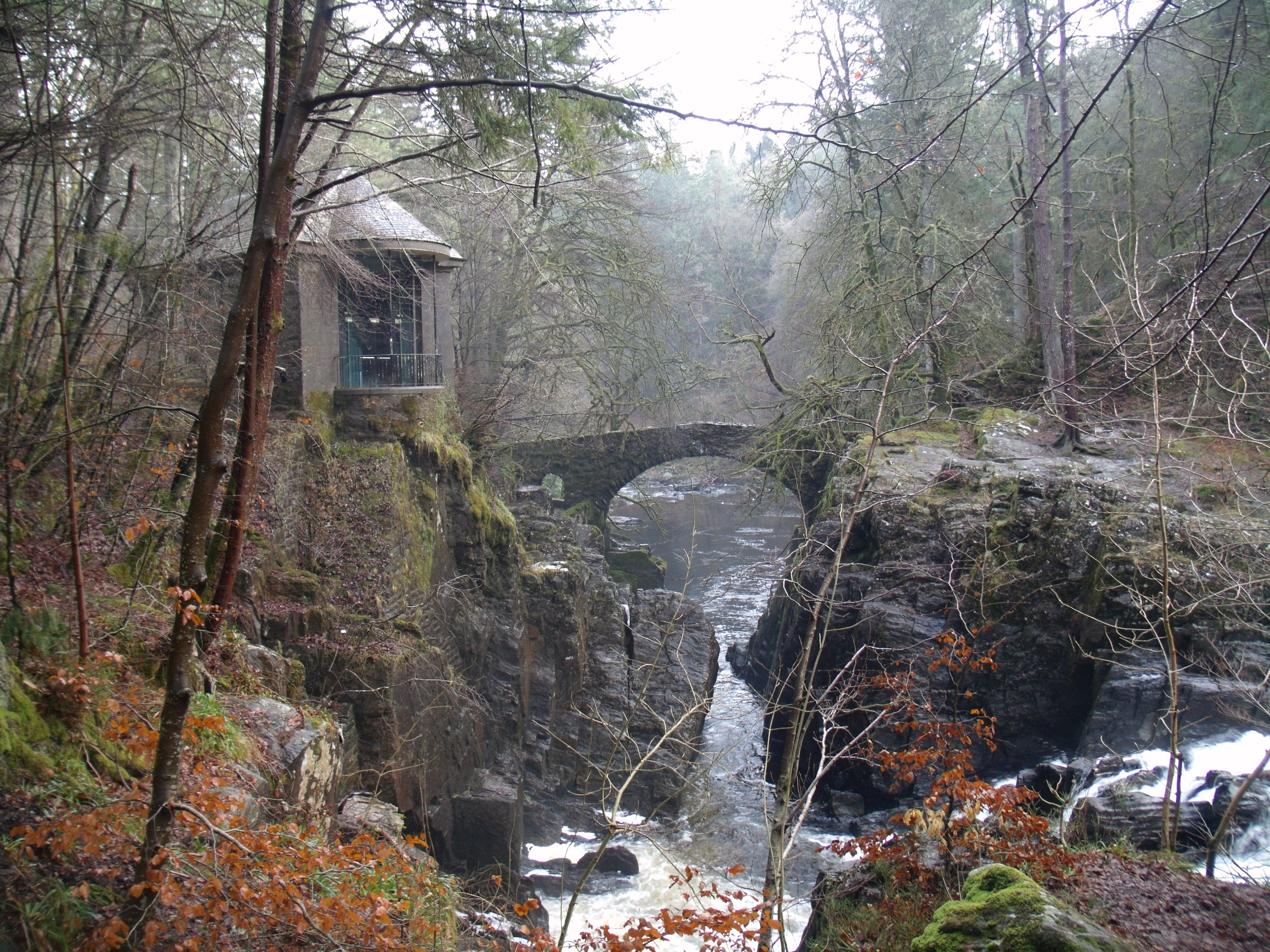
Ossian's Hall of Mirrors and the Hermitage Bridge

== Plunge pool ==
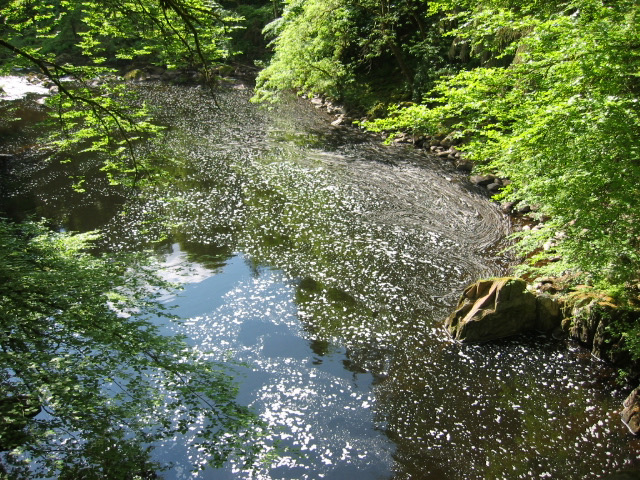
The plunge pool and its layer of post-falls foam

== See also ==
- Waterfalls of Scotland
