= River Braan =

River in Scotland

Coordinates: 56°33′N 3°35′W

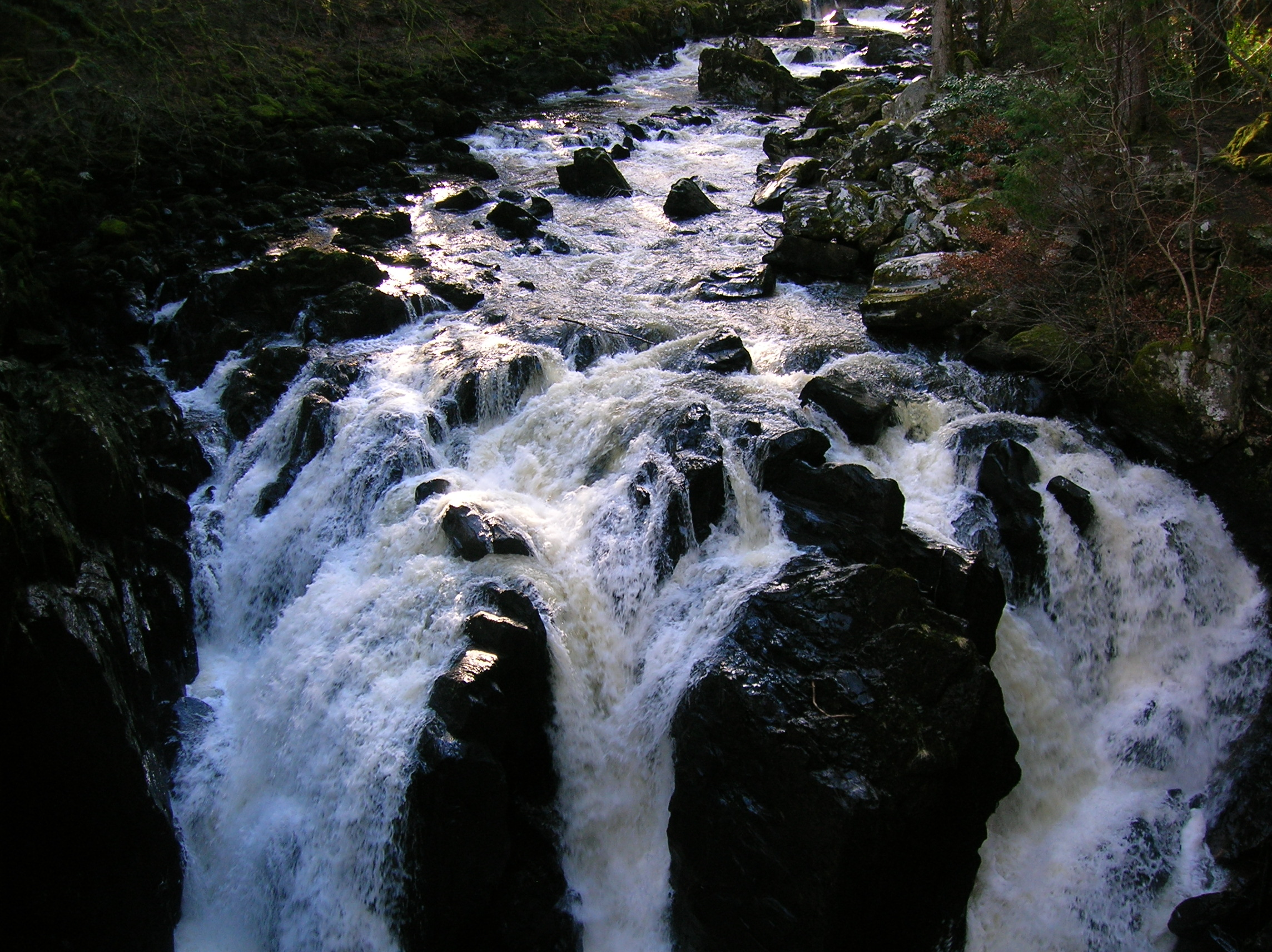
The River Braan at The Hermitage, Dunkeld

The River Braan (Scottish Gaelic: Breamhainn) is a tributary of the River Tay in Scotland. Within the county of Perth and Kinross, it flows 11 miles (17 km) eastwards from Loch Freuchie, near Amulree, and joins the River Tay near Dunkeld.

== Etymology ==
The name Braan is likely of Pritenic origin and derived from *breμ-, meaning "bellow, bray, roar" (Welsh brefu). A similar etymological root underlies the names of the rivers Breamish in Northumberland, England, and the Brefi in Ceredigion, Wales.

== See also ==
- The Hermitage
- Hermitage Bridge
- Ossian's Hall of Mirrors
- Black Linn Falls
