= Ossian's Hall of Mirrors =

View-house in Scotland

Coordinates: 56.5575°N 3.6145°W

Ossian's Hall of Mirrors is a Georgian structure located at The Hermitage in Dunkeld, Scotland.

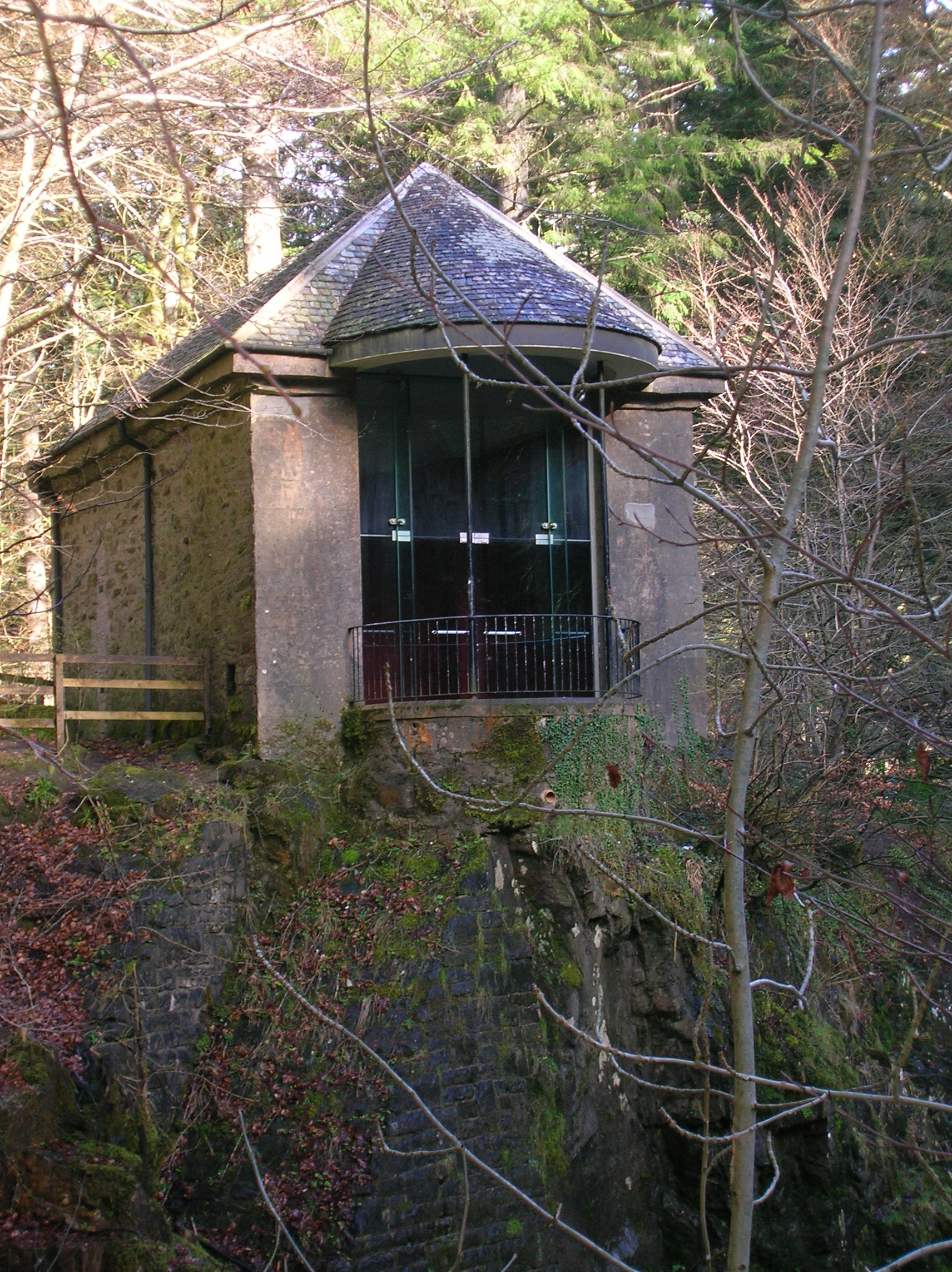
Ossian's Hall of Mirrors

== History of the site ==
=== The original view-house ===
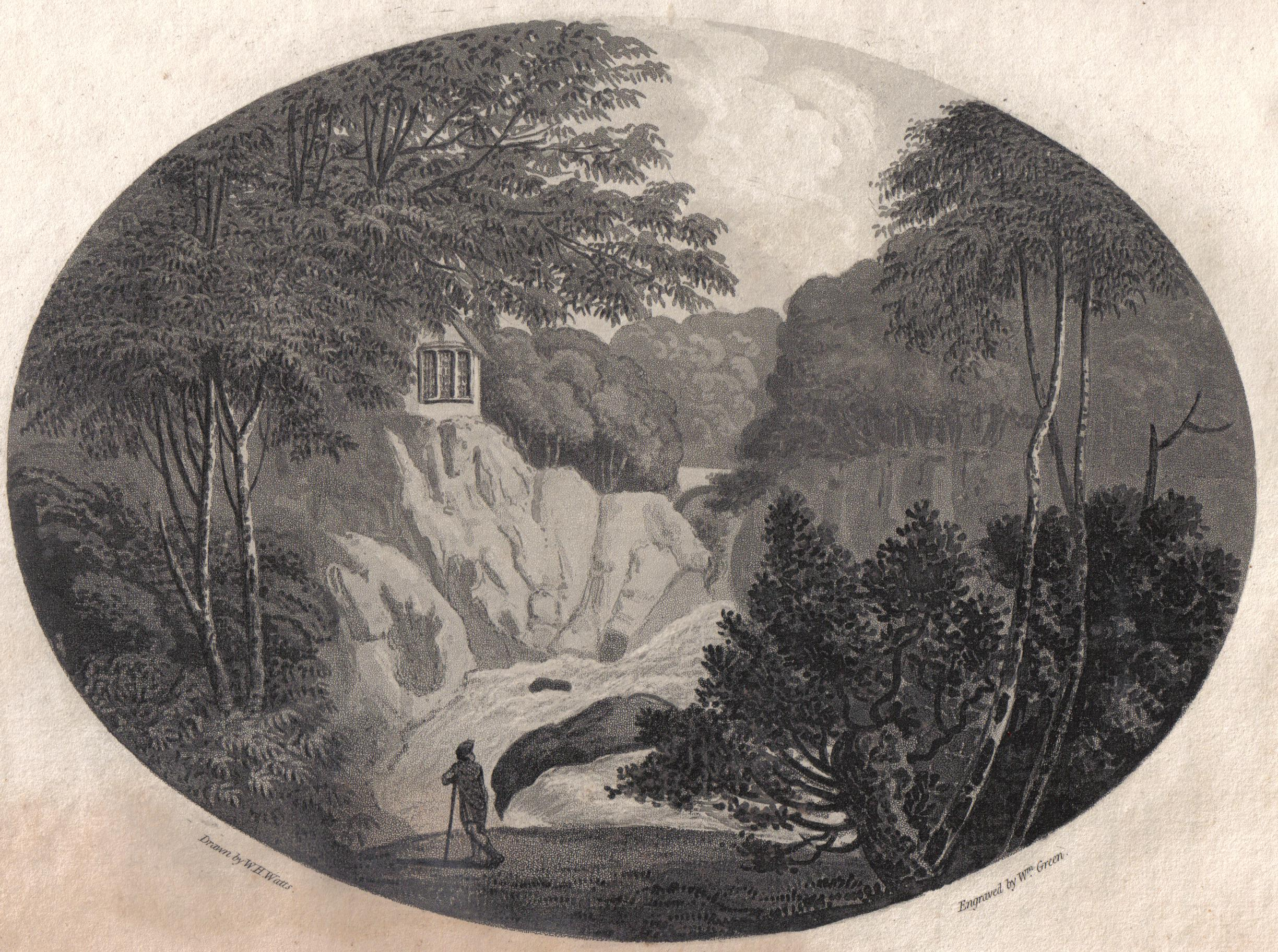
Ossian's Hall at Dunkeld in 1800

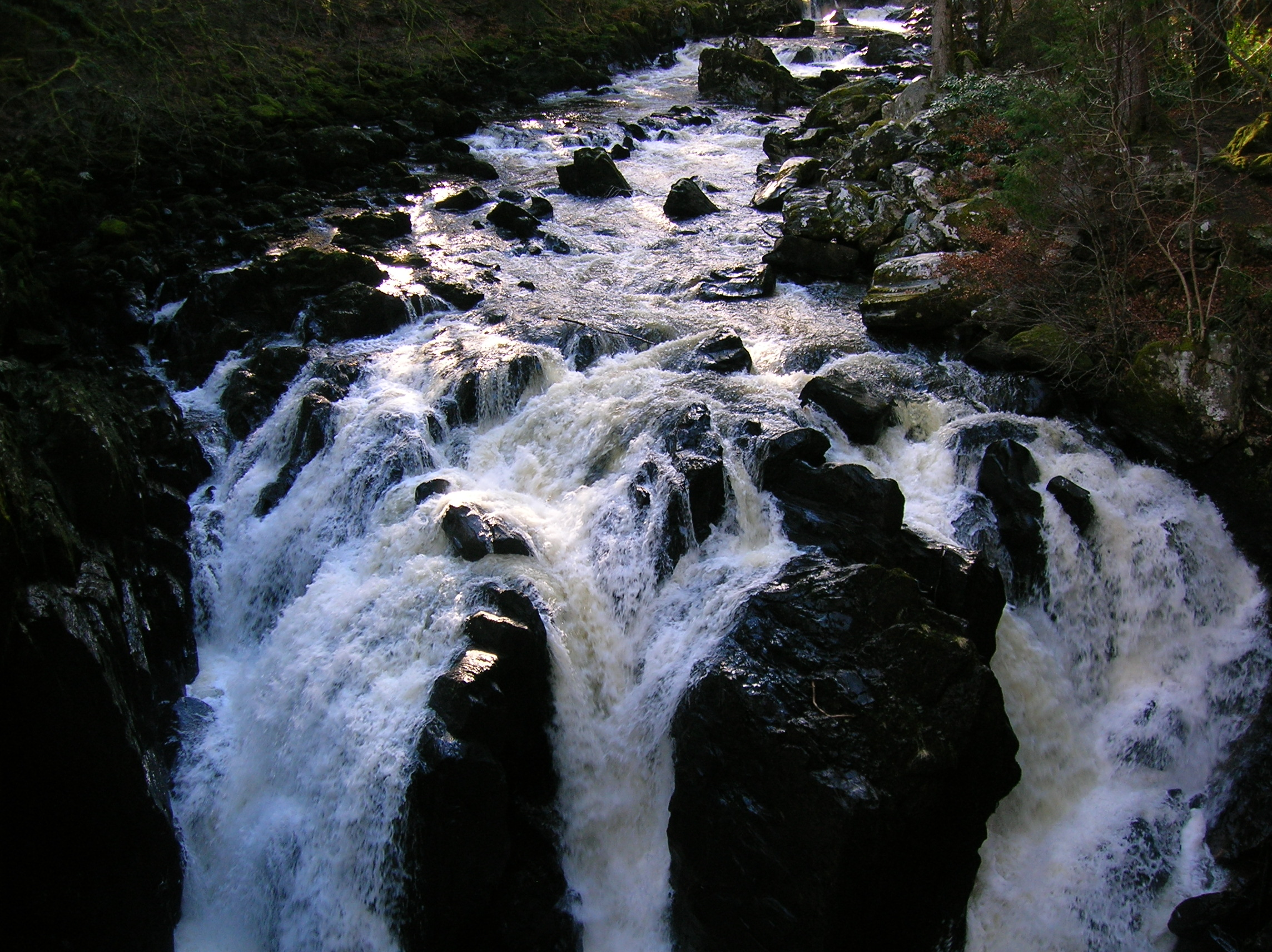
The Black Linn Falls at The Hermitage, as seen from Ossian's Hall

The Hermitage and Ossian's Hall of Mirrors was originally an unremarkable view-house in a position overlooking the Black Linn Falls of the Braan, a tributary of the River Tay. This folly was built on a rocky outcrop for the 2nd Duke of Atholl in 1757.

=== Ossian's shrine ===
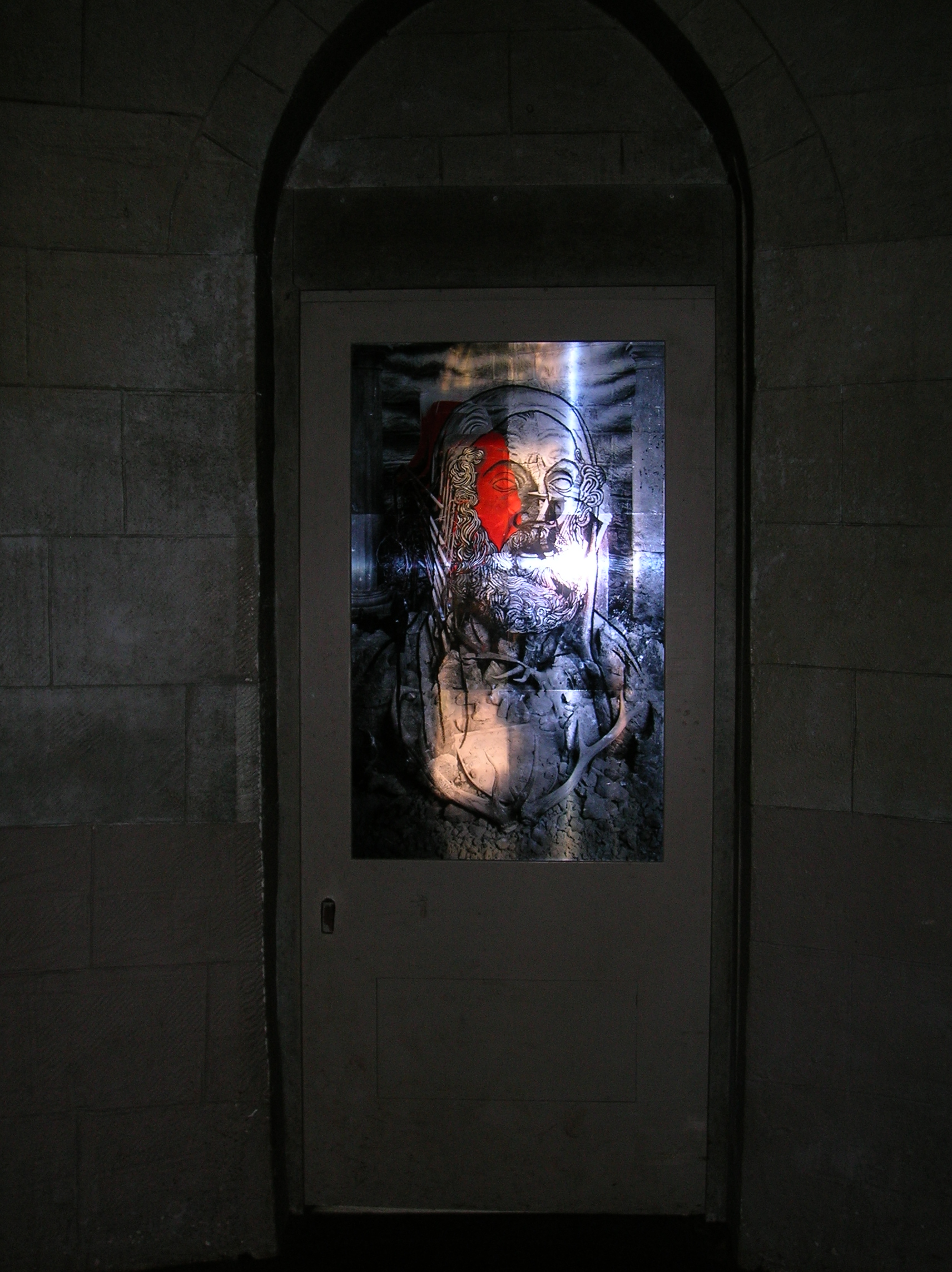
An image of Ossian on an internal door in the hall of mirrors

The Hermitage was redecorated in 1783 as a shrine to the blind bard, Ossian. Ossian is supposed to have lived and written his heroic verse around the 3rd century.

The redecorated hall was intended to evoke features of 'shock' and 'amazement' in the viewers' minds; the room from where views of the waterfall were taken was lined with mirrors which made the spectator imagine that the water was appearing from all angles. William Wordsworth composed a poem which described the 'World of Wonder' in this room. Another description states that in the 1780s, visitors entering were met by a painting of Ossian serenading a group of maidens. The guide operated a device that withdrew the painting into the wall, providing access to another room - a hall of mirrors - giving the illusion of water pouring all around reflecting the river cascading outside. In 1803 the hall had walks that were intersected, here and there, by a small garden of fine flowers among rocks and stones'. These small-scale gardens have since gone.

In 1803 Dorothy Wordsworth wrote "The waterfall, which we came to see, warned us by a loud roaring that we might expect it; we first, however, conducted into a small compartment, where the gardener desired us to look at a painting of the figure of Ossian, which, while he was telling us the story of the young artist who performed the work, disappeared, parting in the middle, flying asunder as if by the touch of magic, and lo! we are at the entrance of a splendid room, which was almost dizzy and alive with waterfalls, that tumbled in all directions - the great cascade, which was opposite to the window that faced us, being reflected in innumerable mirrors upon the ceiling and against the walls".

=== Early literary accounts of the Hall of Mirrors ===
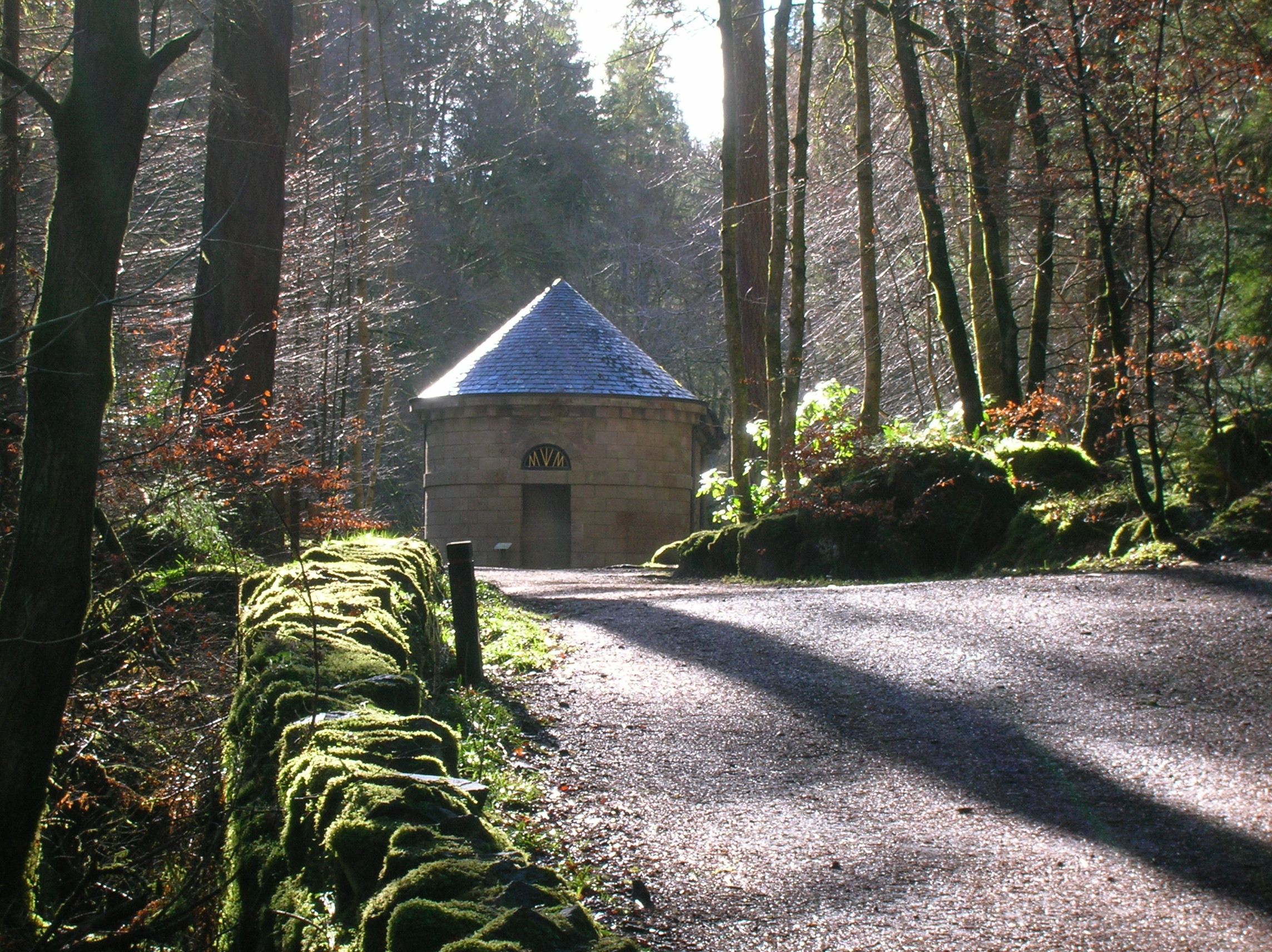
A view from the rear of Ossian's Hall

Garnett in 1800 visited the site. He describes the 'Hall of Mirrors' as having its sides and ceiling covered with mirrors, in which "the cascade is seen by reflection, sometimes running upwards, contrary to the direction of gravity, and sometimes in a horizontal stream over the head."

=== The decline and restoration of the site ===
In 1869 vandals blew up part of Ossian's Hall and the area was left to decay. In 1943 the 8th Duchess of Atholl donated it and 33 acres (13.3ha) of, by then, coniferous woodland along the banks of the River Braan to the National Trust for Scotland in accordance with the wishes of the late Duke. The National Trust for Scotland restored the building in 2007 for the use and enjoyment of the public.

== Similar structures ==
- Bonnington Pavilion
