= List of listed buildings in Cromdale, Inverallan and Advie =

This is a list of listed buildings in the parish of Cromdale, Inverallan and Advie in Highland, Scotland.

== List ==
Name	Location	Date Listed	Grid Ref. (Note: Sometimes known as OSGB36, the grid reference (where provided) is based on the British national grid reference system used by the Ordnance Survey. • "Guide to National Grid". Ordnance Survey. • "Get-a-map". Ordnance Survey.)	Geo-coordinates	Notes	LB Number (Note: Historic Environment Scotland assign a unique alphanumeric identifier to each designated site in Scotland, for listed buildings this always begins with "LB", for example "LB12345".)	Image
Tormore Distillery, Manager's House, Duty Free Warehouses, Distillery And Offices, Generator House, 1, 2 Richardson Road, Community Centre, 3-12A Richardson Road, Gate Piers				57°23′55″N 3°24′29″W	Category B	337	Upload Photo
Castle Grant, East Lodge. Railway Bridge Over A939 Road And Entrance Arch To Drive				57°21′07″N 3°36′32″W	Category A	349	Upload another image
Dava Bridge Over Dorback Burn				57°25′49″N 3°39′34″W	Category C(S)	354	Upload another image See more images
Cromdale Old Church Of Scotland Manse, Steading And Gatepiers				57°20′28″N 3°32′59″W	Category B	5106	Upload Photo
(Old) Spey Bridge Over River Spey				57°19′03″N 3°35′45″W	Category A	335	Upload another image
Cromdale Parish Church Burial Ground And Watch-House Church Of Scotland				57°20′30″N 3°33′08″W	Category B	352	Upload Photo
Castle Grant, Home Farm, Courtyard Range To South Including Walls And Gatepiers				57°21′16″N 3°35′59″W	Category C(S)	48934	Upload Photo
Castle Grant				57°21′07″N 3°35′41″W	Category A	348	Upload another image
Dulnain Bridge, Finlarig				57°18′27″N 3°40′15″W	Category C(S)	355	Upload Photo
Advie Old Manse (Former Church Of Scotland Manse)				57°23′25″N 3°27′20″W	Category C(S)	345	Upload Photo
Advie Parish Church, Church Of Scotland				57°23′26″N 3°27′18″W	Category C(S)	344	Upload Photo
Castle Grant, West Lodge, Gate Piers And Retaining Walls				57°20′23″N 3°36′16″W	Category B	350	Upload Photo
Lethendry Castle				57°19′41″N 3°31′22″W	Category C(S)	334	Upload Photo
(New) Spey Bridge Over River Spey				57°19′18″N 3°36′22″W	Category B	336	Upload Photo
Advie, Tulchan Lodge				57°24′09″N 3°27′05″W	Category B	346	Upload Photo
Castle Grant, Railway Bridge In Policies				57°21′22″N 3°36′13″W	Category B	351	Upload Photo
Dava, Loch Allan, Aa Sentry Box (No 746)				57°25′43″N 3°39′35″W	Category B	49222	Upload Photo
Advie Bridge Over River Spey				57°23′59″N 3°27′55″W	Category B	343	Upload Photo
Dava Bridge Over Allt Na Ceardaich				57°25′28″N 3°39′38″W	Category C(S)	353	Upload Photo

== Key ==
The scheme for classifying buildings in Scotland is:

- Category A: "buildings of national or international importance, either architectural or historic; or fine, little-altered examples of some particular period, style or building type."
- Category B: "buildings of regional or more than local importance; or major examples of some particular period, style or building type, which may have been altered."
- Category C: "buildings of local importance; lesser examples of any period, style, or building type, as originally constructed or moderately altered; and simple traditional buildings which group well with other listed buildings."

In March 2016 there were 47,288 listed buildings in Scotland. Of these, 8% were Category A, and 50% were Category B, with the remaining 42% being Category C.

== See also ==
- List of listed buildings in Highland
