= 1863 in rail transport =

This article lists events related to rail transport that occurred in 1863.

== Events ==
=== January events ===
- January 8 – Ground is broken by the Central Pacific Railroad in Sacramento, California, on the western half of the First transcontinental railroad in North America.
- January 10 – The Metropolitan Railway, first section of the London Underground, opens from Paddington to Farringdon Street.

=== February events ===
- February 20 – The London Pneumatic Despatch Company inaugurates its pneumatic tube atmospheric railway for parcels between Euston station and the G.P.O. North Western District sorting office in London, England (0.75 mi (1.21 km) of 2 ft (60 cm) gauge).

=== March events ===
- March 2 – Clapham Junction railway station in England opens.
- March 6 – The final vote between construction of a rail line or a channel is taken with the result six to three in favor of the rail line, which would eventually become the Randsfjorden Line in Norway.
- March 16 – Berlin-Stettiner Eisenbahn-Gesellschaft in Germany opens its Szczecin–Pasewalk and Anklam–Pasewalk–Prenzlau–Angermünde lines.

=== May events ===
- May 3 – The Atchison and Topeka Railroad officially changes names to the Atchison, Topeka and Santa Fe Railroad to more closely match the railroad's goal of reaching Santa Fe, New Mexico, by rail.
- May 14 – The Great Indian Peninsula Railway line from Bombay (Mumbai) to Poonah (Pune) through the Bhor Ghat using zig zag and 28 tunnels is opened.

=== June events ===
- June 11 – The Parliament of Norway passes the construction of what would become the Randsfjorden Line with 65 against 44 votes.

=== July events ===
- July 1 – The Strathspey Railway opens from Dufftown to Abernethy, including Carron Bridge (River Spey), the last cast iron railway bridge to be built in Scotland.

=== September events ===
- September
  - The Kansas Pacific Railway begins construction in Kansas, building westward from Kansas City toward Colorado.
  - The Western Railroad from Fayetteville to the coalfields of Egypt, North Carolina, is completed.

=== October events ===
- October 5 – The Brooklyn, Bath and Coney Island Rail Road starts operations in Brooklyn, New York; this is now the oldest right-of-way on the New York City Subway, the largest rapid transit system in the United States and one of the largest in the world.
- October 17 – Thee San Francisco and San Jose Railroad begins excursion service between San Francisco and Menlo Park, California.
- October 23 – Festiniog Railway in North Wales introduces steam locomotives into general service, the first time this has been done anywhere in the world on a public railway of such a narrow gauge (2 ft (60 cm)).
- October 26 – The first rails are laid for construction of the Central Pacific Railroad in California.

=== November events ===
- November 9 – Gov. Stanford, Central Pacific Railroad's first locomotive, enters service in California.

=== December events ===
- December 1 – Opening of first steam-operated passenger railway in New Zealand, at Christchurch in South Island 1,600 mm (5 ft 3 in) gauge).
- December 2 – Union Pacific Railroad holds groundbreaking ceremonies in the construction of the First transcontinental railroad at Omaha, Nebraska, but the first rails aren't laid for another year.
- December 4 – Construction begins on the Randsfjorden Line in Norway.
- December 15 – First mountain railway opens in Romania, from Anina to Oraviţa.

=== Unknown date events ===
- John W. Murphy builds a Whipple-type truss bridge across the Lehigh River at Jim Thorpe, Pennsylvania for the Lehigh Valley Railroad in the United States, the first known to have both tension and compression members in wrought iron.
- Classification yard opens at Saint-Étienne in France.
- Henry Farnam retires from the presidency of the Chicago, Rock Island and Pacific Railroad.
- Jackson and Sharp Company, later to become part of American Car and Foundry, is founded in Wilmington, Delaware.

== Births ==
=== October births ===
- October 31 – William Gibbs McAdoo, American lawyer, statesman and Director General of Railroads (d. 1941).

== Deaths ==
=== November deaths ===
- November 2 – Theodore Judah, American engineer who argued the case for construction of the First transcontinental railroad (b. 1826).
