= Aberlour railway station =

Disused railway station in Aberlour, Moray

Coordinates: 57.47130°N 3.22557°W

Aberlour
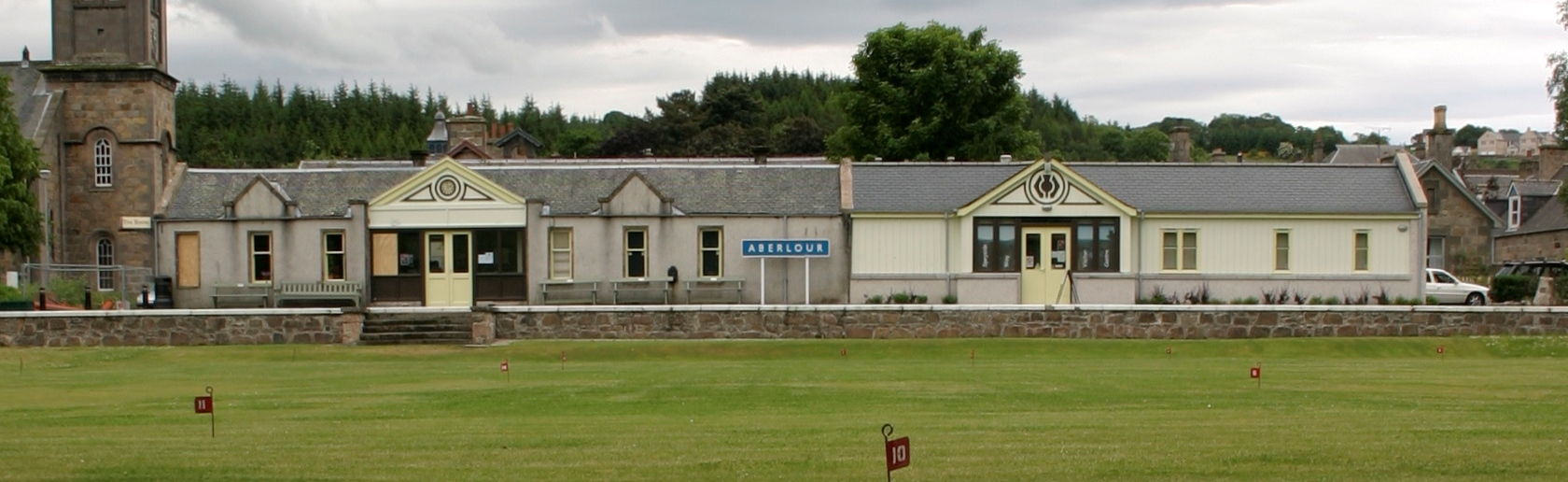
- Aberlour railway station in 2006

General information
- Location: Aberlour, Moray; Scotland
- Platforms: 2

Other information
- Status: Disused

History
- Original company: Strathspey Railway
- Pre-grouping: Great North of Scotland Railway
- Post-grouping: London and North Eastern Railway

Key dates
- 1 July 1863: Station opens
- 18 October 1965: Station closes for passengers
- 15 November 1971: station closed for goods
Location

Aberlour railway station served the village of Aberlour, Scotland, from 1863 to 1965.

== History ==
The station was opened by the Strathspey Railway when it opened the first section of its railway between Dufftown and Nethy Bridge on 1 July 1863.

It was the first station after the junction at Craigellachie, where the line met the Morayshire Railway line to Elgin.

Both the Strathspey and Morayshire railways were absorbed into the Great North of Scotland Railway in 1866 and 1881 respectively.

The station was host to a LNER camping coach from 1937 to 1939. A coach was also positioned here by Scottish Region of British Railways from 1954 to 1955.

The station closed to passengers on 18 October 1965 but the line was still open to freight until 15 November 1971.

== The site today ==
The site is now home to the Speyside Way Visitor Centre. The building has been enlarged and the old railway buildings are now a teashop.

Preceding station	Disused railways	Following station
Dailuaine Halt	Great North of Scotland Railway; Strathspey Railway	Craigellachie
