= Carron Bridge =

Carron Bridge is a name given to at least three bridges in Scotland:

- The Carron Bridge (River Spey) crosses the Spey near Carron in Moray
- The Carron Bridge (River Carron) crosses the Carron between Stirling and Kilsyth
- The Carron Bridge (Sutherland) crosses a different River Carron west of Ardgay in Sutherland
