= Dalvey railway station =

Short-lived railway station in Forres, Moray

Coordinates: 57.601990°N 3.662315°W

Dalvey

General information
- Location: Forres, Moray; Scotland
- Platforms: 1

Other information
- Status: Disused

History
- Original company: Strathspey Railway
- Pre-grouping: Great North of Scotland Railway

Key dates
- 1 July 1863: Opened
- 1 September 1868: Closed
Location

Dalvey railway station, also known as Dalvie railway station, served the burgh of Forres, Moray, Scotland, from 1863 to 1868 on the Strathspey Railway.

== History ==
The station opened on 1 July 1863 by the Strathspey Railway. It was a short-lived station, closing five years later on 1 September 1868.

Preceding station	Historical railways	Following station
Advie; Line and station closed	Strathspey Railway	Cromdale; Line and station closed
