= Edmund McCorquodale =

English cricketer

Personal information
- Full name: Edmund George McCorquodale
- Born: 23 July 1881; Weybridge, Surrey, England
- Died: 24 May 1904 (aged 22); Advie, Morayshire, Scotland
- Batting: Right-handed
- Bowling: Right-arm medium

Domestic team information
- Years: Team
- 1899: Hertfordshire
- 1901: Cambridge University

Career statistics
Competition	First-class
Matches	2
Runs scored	3
Batting average	–
100s/50s	–/–
Top score	3*
Balls bowled	228
Wickets	1
Bowling average	82.00
5 wickets in innings	–
10 wickets in match	–
Best bowling	1/27
Catches/stumpings	1/–
- Source: Cricinfo, 9 July 2019

Edmund George McCorquodale (23 July 1881 – 24 May 1904) was an English first-class cricketer.

The son of George Frederick McCorquodale and his wife, Mary Augusta Walcott Henderson, he was born at Weybridge in July 1881. He was educated at Harrow School, before going up to Trinity College, Cambridge. While studying at Cambridge, he made two appearances in first-class cricket for Cambridge University in 1901, against Worcestershire and Surrey. After injuring himself in the Surrey match, he featured in no further first-class matches for Cambridge. In addition to playing first-class cricket, he also played minor counties cricket for Hertfordshire in 1899, making two appearances in the Minor Counties Championship. He died from appendicitis in May 1904 at Tulcan Lodge in Advie, Morayshire.
