= Knockando (Dalbeallie) railway station =

Disused railway station in Knockando, Moray

Knockando
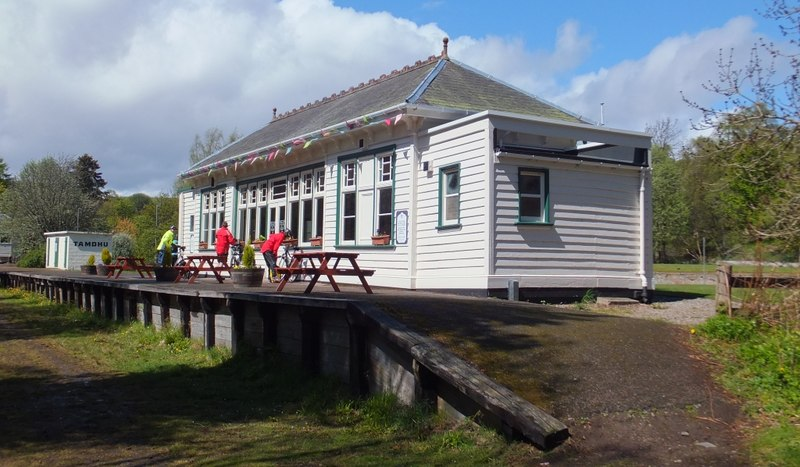
- The former platform and station building in 2015

General information
- Location: Knockando, Moray; Scotland
- Coordinates: 57.4582°N 3.3497°W
- Grid reference: NJ191416
- Platforms: 2

Other information
- Status: Disused

History
- Original company: Great North of Scotland Railway
- Pre-grouping: Great North of Scotland Railway
- Post-grouping: London and North Eastern Railway; British Rail (Scottish Region)

Key dates
- 1 July 1899: Opened as Dalbeallie
- 1 May 1905: Name changed to Knockando
- 18 October 1965: Closed

Listed Building – Category C(S)
- Designated: 9 November 1987
- Reference no.: LB8502
Location

Knockando railway station served the village of Knockando, Moray, Scotland, from 1899 to 1965 on the Strathspey Railway.

== History ==
The station opened as Dalbeallie on 1 July 1899 by the Great North of Scotland Railway. To the north was a goods yard, to the west was Tamdhu Distillery and on the eastbound platforms were the station building and the signal box. The station's name was changed to Knockando on 1 May 1905 to avoid confusion with Dalbeattie. It closed on 18 October 1965.

| Preceding station | Disused railways | Following station |
|---|---|---|
| Gilbey's Cottages Halt; Line and station closed | Great North of Scotland Railway; Strathspey Railway | Blacksboat; Line and station closed |
