= Grantown railway station =

Grantown railway station or Grantown-on-Spey railway station may refer to:

- Grantown-on-Spey (West) railway station, on the Inverness and Perth Junction Railway, then Highland Railway
- Grantown-on-Spey (East) railway station, on the Strathspey Railway, then Great North of Scotland Railway
