= Strathspey Railway (GNoSR) =

Scottish railway company

Overview
- Locale: Scotland
- Dates of operation: 1 July 1863–30 July 1966
- Successor: Great North of Scotland Railway

Technical
- Track gauge: 1,435 mm (4 ft 8 1/2 in)

The Strathspey Railway was a railway company in Scotland that ran from Dufftown (in Moray) to Boat of Garten (in Badenoch and Strathspey). It was proposed locally but supported by the larger Great North of Scotland Railway (GNoSR), which wanted to use it as an outlet towards Perth. The GNoSR had to provide much of the funding, and the value of traffic proved to be illusory. The line opened in 1863 to Abernethy, but for the time being was unable to make the desired connection to the southward main line. Although later some through goods traffic developed, the route never achieved its intended purpose.

In common with many rural railways, it lost business heavily to competing road transport, both passenger and freight, from the 1930s. In 1958 lightweight diesel railbuses were used on the line in an attempt to contain the fast-rising financial losses, but the novel form of vehicle failed to bring about the necessary profitability. The line was closed to passenger traffic in 1965, and to general goods services in 1968. A short section north of Aberlour remained in use until complete closure of the line in 1971.

== Origin ==
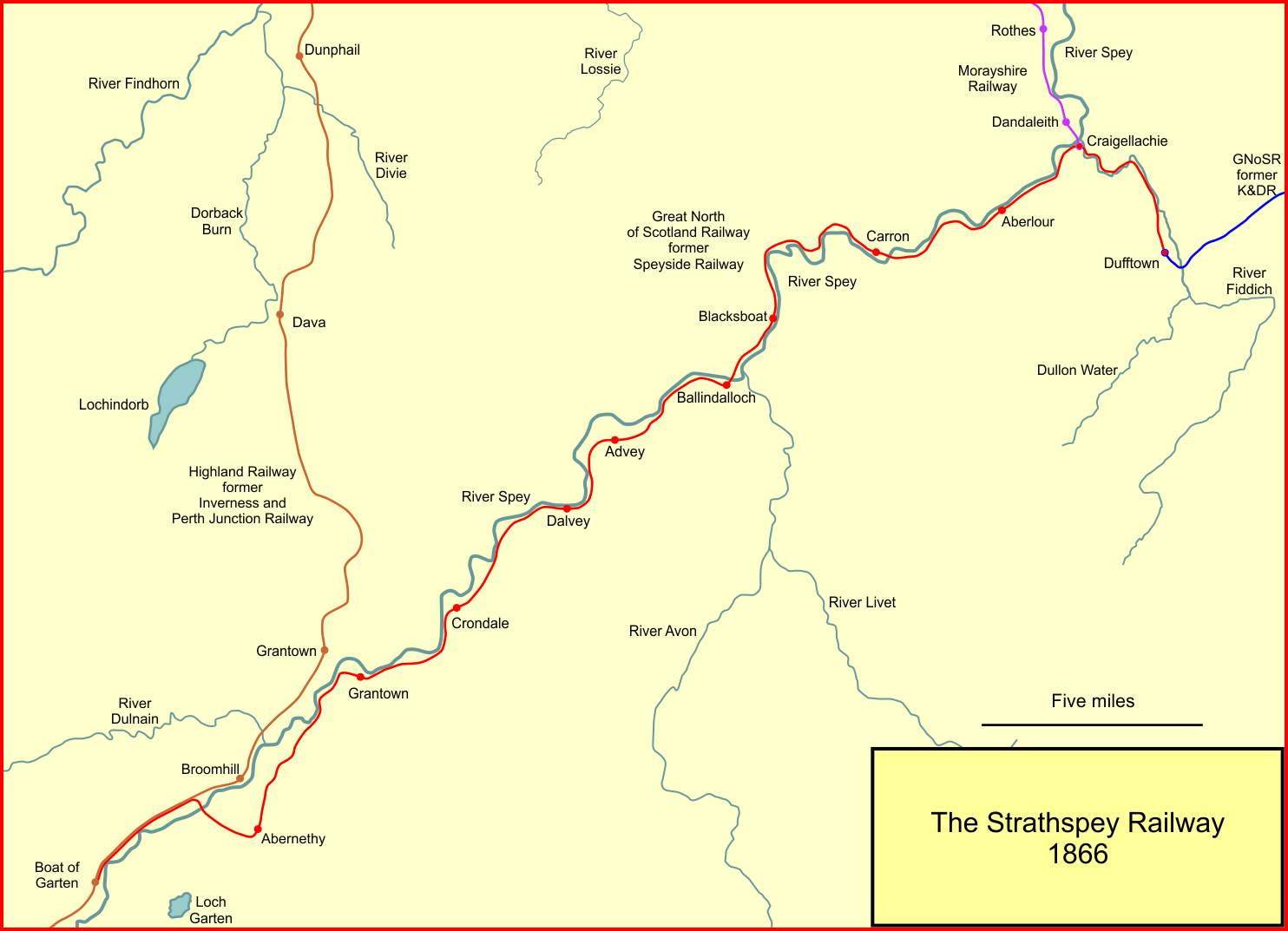
Strathspey Railway system at the time of transfer to the GNoSR

A railway came to Aberdeen, from the south, in 1840. From that time there was a demand from interests in Inverness for a railway connection to Aberdeen that would give them a connection to Central Scotland and the south, albeit by a roundabout route. It proved difficult to find the money for this simple aspiration, and after a number of tentative moves, the Great North of Scotland Railway (GNoSR) extended a line from Aberdeen as far as Huntly, and then Keith; its line reached there in 1856. From the Inverness end, the Inverness and Aberdeen Junction Railway (I&AJR) reached Keith in 1858. A through connection was established, but for the time being passengers had to change trains at Keith, and any co-operation between the two companies was patchy. Moreover, a lack of co-operation at Aberdeen meant that connections there, with the North British Railway, meant that through passenger journeys were unpredictable.

The Morayshire Railway had established itself north of Elgin, connecting to Lossiemouth, and it developed a local scheme to connect Craigellachie into the emerging railway network. It opened a line from Orton on the I&AJR line between Elgin and Keith as far as Rothes on 23 August 1858, extending to its Craigellachie station on 24 December 1858. In fact the terminus was in Dandaleith, on the north-west bank of the River Spey; Craigellachie was over the river, on the south-east bank.

Inverness people travelling to the south resented the long deviation through Aberdeen, and they decided to build their own line to reach Perth, starting out from Forres on the Inverness and Aberdeen Junction Railway. This new southward line, constructed by the nominally independent Inverness and Perth Junction Railway, ran to Perth via Dava Moor, using the Perth and Dunkeld Railway and a section of the Scottish North Eastern Railway at the southern end. That project was authorised by the Inverness and Perth Junction Railway Act 1861 (24 & 25 Vict. c. clxxxvi) and it opened throughout in 1863. The building of this line had the potential to abstract a huge volume of traffic from the GNoSR route via Aberdeen. A report submitted to the GNoSR board claimed that "the value of through traffic between stations on the Inverness line and the south is apt to be over-rated", but their true belief was revealed when they prepared a parliamentary bill for a 33-mile (53 km) continuation of the Keith and Dufftown Railway line down the River Spey as far as Grantown-on-Spey, which was on the proposed I&PJR line to Perth. It was noted that there were large forests owned by Lord Seafield, that might generate timber traffic.

== Formation of the Strathspey Railway ==
By October 1860 the scheme had developed into "The Strathspey Railway". The plan was to extend the Keith and Dufftown Railway to a more useful station for Dufftown at Balvenie, and to build the Strathspey Railway on from there via Craigellachie to Abernethy. A pact had been agreed with the Inverness and Perth Junction Railway not to oppose one another's bills, so the Strathspey Railway Act 1861 (24 & 25 Vict. c. xvi) received royal assent on 17 May 1861; authorised capital was £270,000. The Inverness and Perth Junction Railway was incorporated on 22 July 1861. At the same time the Morayshire Railway received parliamentary approval to extend its line across the river at Craigellachie from the original terminus to a junction with the Strathspey Railway. The Keith and Dufftown Railway opened on 21 February 1862.

The Speyside line required two major crossings of the River Spey, at Carron and Ballindalloch. During the construction of the line, the health of the main contractor, Preston, failed, and he was unable to proceed, and after a delay, a new contractor was appointed. Colonel Yolland of the Board of Trade inspected the line, and approved it, while commenting that the curves and gradients required special care in operation; and that a quantity of second-hand rails should be changed without delay, as otherwise they "would set a precedent".

== Opening ==
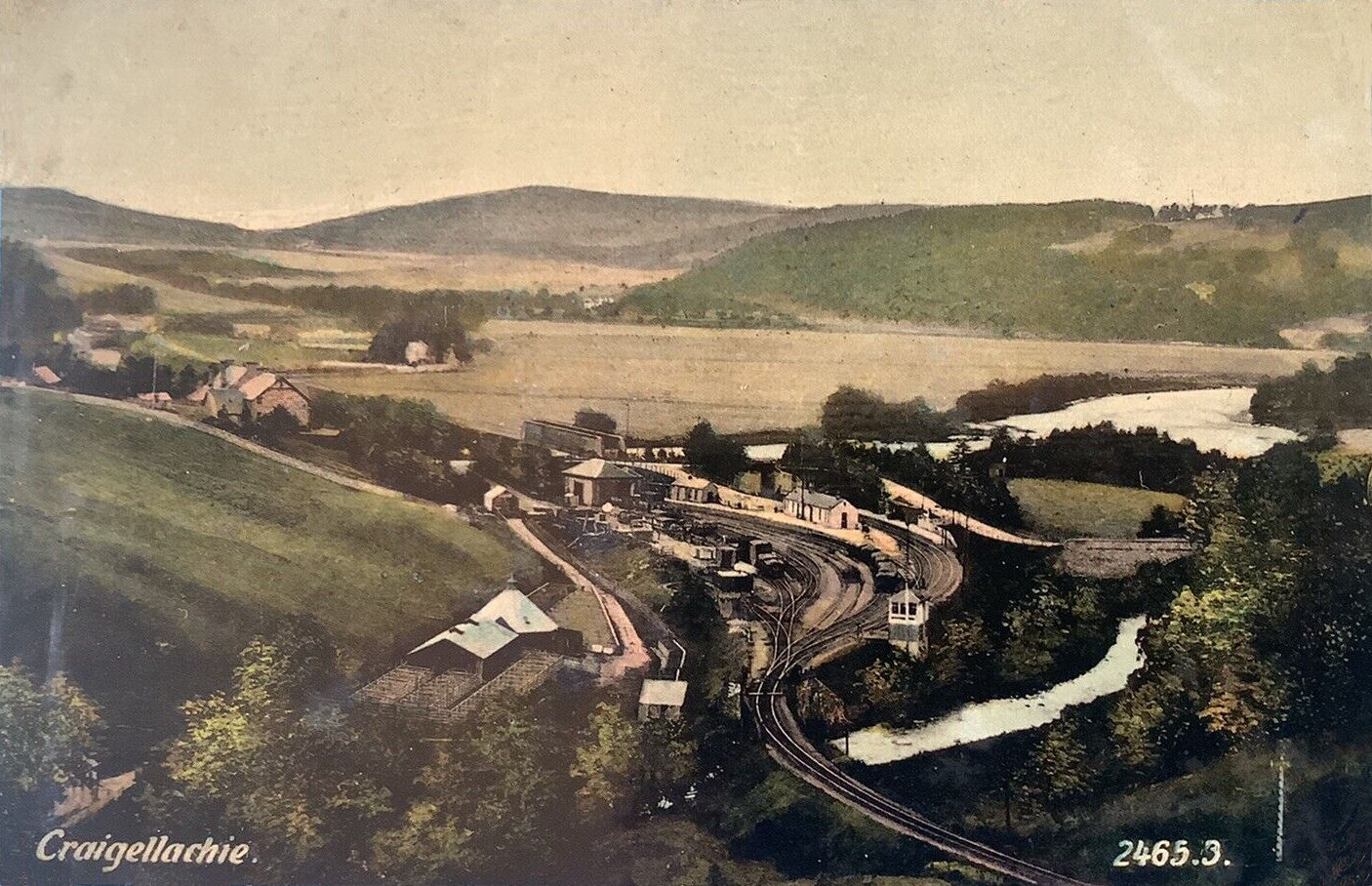
Craigellachie railway station

The line opened for traffic on 1 July 1863 between Dufftown and Abernethy (later Nethy Bridge), with stations at Aberlour, Carron, Blacksboat, Ballindalloch, Advie, Dalvey, Cromdale and Grantown. The passenger train service consisted of three trains each way daily, with an additional round trip on Saturday evenings. On the same day the Morayshire Railway opened its extension across the River Spey from Dandaleith to Strathspey Junction, renamed Craigellachie on 1 June 1864. The GNoSR was now physically linked to the Morayshire Railway, gaining an independent route to Elgin; it started to work the smaller company's traffic.

After a delay, the line was extended to meet up with the Inverness and Perth Junction Railway at Boat of Garten on 1 August 1866. The two lines converged at Tullochgorum, about 3 miles (5 km) north of Boat of Garten, but did not make a junction: the two single lines ran alongside one another as far as Boat of Garten, with the railway connection taking place at the southern end of Boat of Garten station. When this extension was being proposed, the GNoSR had reservations, fearing that traffic heading south would run by the Aviemore route rather than via Aberdeen.

The line just about covered its operating costs, but there was almost no surplus to pay dividends or the interest on loans.

== Amalgamations ==
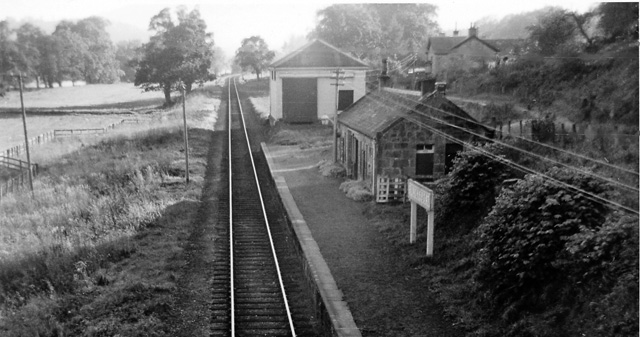
Blacksboat Station in 1961

On 1 February 1865, the Inverness and Aberdeen Junction Railway and the Inverness and Perth Junction Railway amalgamated. On 29 June 1865, the combined undertaking was authorised by the Highland Railway Act 1865 (28 & 29 Vict. c. clxviii) to be known as the Highland Railway; this took effect on 1 August 1886.

Also on 1 August 1866 the Strathspey Railway and the Keith and Dufftown Railway were formally incorporated into the Great North of Scotland Railway by the Great North of Scotland Railway (Amalgamation) Act 1866 (29 & 30 Vict. c. cclxxxviii).

During World War I the timber resources sought by the GNoSR came to be exploited. The Great North laid down a timber siding near Knockando, and two more at Nethy Bridge, one of which had a narrow gauge railway connecting it with the surrounding woods.

== Passenger train services ==
There appear to have been no regular through workings connecting the Strathspey line with the Perth, Dufftown or Elgin lines in either direction.

According to Bradshaw's Guide of May 1864, there were three trains each way between Strathspey Junction (renamed Craigellachie Junction the following month) and Abernethy (renamed to Nethy Bridge) on weekdays, with an additional train each way on Saturday evenings. The journey took around 1 hour 40 minutes. In December 1895, there were three trains each way between Craigellachie Junction (renamed Craigellachie in 1897) and Boat of Garten, supplemented by two short workings between Craigellachie Junction and Ballindalloch. Services in April 1910 followed a similar pattern. In July 1922, there were four trains each way, although one of the southbound trains ran from Craigellachie to Ballindalloch only. In 1938 there were three daily trains supplemented by two southbound and one northbound on Saturdays. None of these timetables show a Sunday service. From 1910 Ballindalloch is indicated as the station "for Tomintoul, 15 miles [24 km] distant".

== Grouping and nationalisation ==
In 1923, the Great North of Scotland Railway became part of the new London and North Eastern Railway (LNER). Most of the railways of Great Britain were "grouped"; in this process they were transferred into one or other of four new large companies, following the Railways Act 1921. The GNoSR was a "constituent" of the new LNER. The grouping had limited impact on the Speyside line, and in 1948 a second government-imposed reorganisation took place, when the railways were taken into national ownership under British Railways.

Since the 1930s road transport had become increasingly attractive for passenger and goods transport in rural and remote areas, and had abstracted much from already barely-profitable train services. This resulted in increasing financial losses, which the government required British Railways to control. In 1955 it was proposed to withdraw passenger services between Ballindalloch and Boat of Garten, the most lightly used part of the line, but hardship to travellers, especially in the winter months, was put forward as an objection, and for the time being the proposal was deferred.

In an attempt to stem the increasing losses on this and other lines, four-wheel diesel railbuses were introduced on some passenger services. This operation started on 3 November 1958, when a real attempt was made to make the service more attractive. Four new request stops were opened on 15 June 1959; they were ground level platforms, and passengers had to negotiate retractable steps to board the train. While the railbuses had a very modern feel to them, in those days there was a considerable volume of non-passenger business forwarded by passenger trains, including individual livestock, and these all had to be transferred to goods services, which were not always suitable. Moreover, the railbuses were extremely unreliable, and when substituted by a conventional train, the ground level halts were impossible to use.

In fact the railbuses did nothing to halt the decline in the line's finances, and this was brought to a head when the entire line was closed to passengers on 18 October 1965. On the same day the Highland line between Aviemore and Forres via Dava was closed.

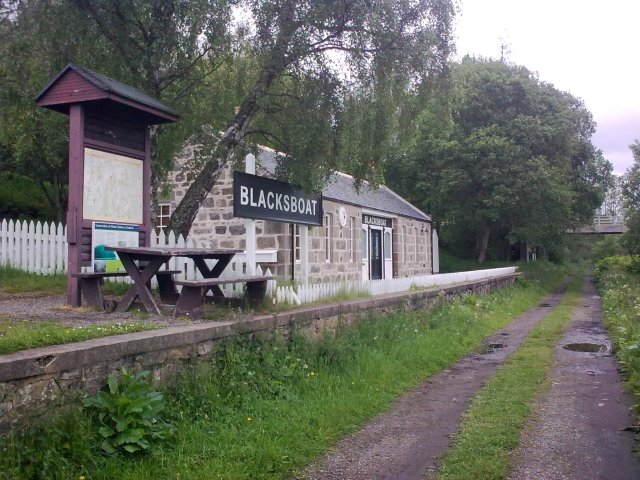
Blacksboat Station - June 2010 - Now part of the Speyside Way

Goods trains continued for a further three years, mainly to carry coal to, and whisky from the distilleries in the Spey valley. However, on 1 November 1968 these services too ceased, the final train being drawn by Bo-Bo Type 2 diesel locomotive D5114. The track was lifted the following year, except for the short section between Aberlour and Dufftown, which remained open for goods traffic until the end of 1971.

== Present day ==
Although the two stations at either end of the line are open, serving two heritage railways, (the Keith and Dufftown Railway at Dufftown, and the (second) Strathspey Railway at Boat of Garten on the Highland Railway's Aviemore to Forres route), no part of the original Strathspey Railway has been preserved. However, the section between Ballindalloch and Craigellachie has now been converted into part of the Speyside Way, which runs between Ballindalloch and Spey Bay.

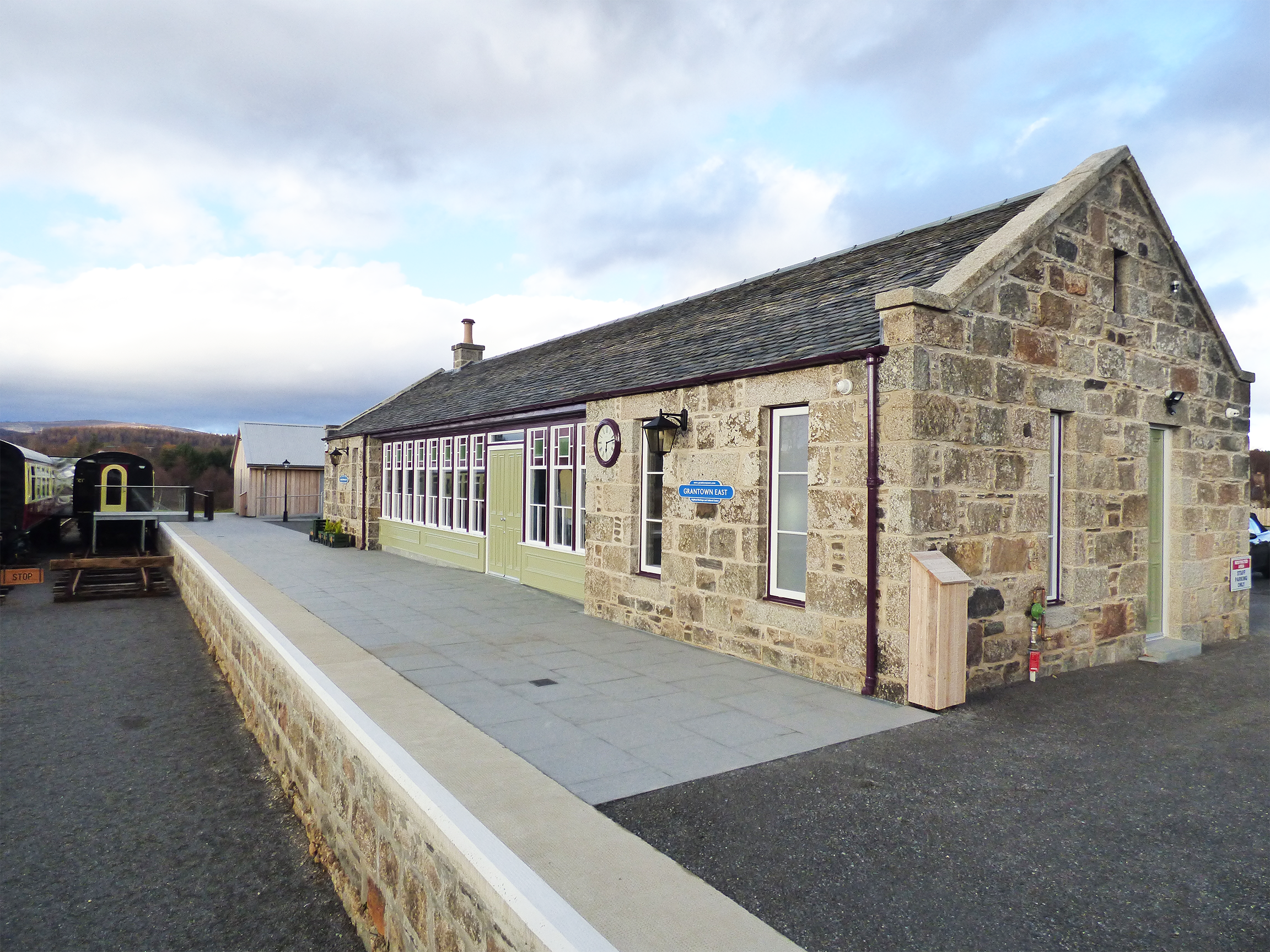
Grantown East: Highland Heritage & Cultural Centre

Many of the railway's attractive stone-built station buildings still exist today; some have been converted for private usage, while others are near derelict. The former station building at Aberlour has been converted into a tearoom and visitor centre. Knockando station buildings have been restored as part of the neighbouring former Tamdhu distillery and are listed buildings. The former Grantown East Station has been completely renovated, reopening exactly fifty years after the last train passed through as the Highland Heritage & Cultural Centre.

Two of the three bridges over the Spey still survive: the joint road/rail cast-iron Carron Bridge and the impressive lattice girder bridge at Ballindalloch, both of which are designated as Category A listed buildings. Only the piers of the bridge at Tomachrochar, to the west of Nethybridge survive.

The bridge at Abernethy (Nethy Bridge) over the River Nethy has completely disappeared, with abutments still visible in the undergrowth. The line is closed in its entirety between Boat of Garten and Dufftown.

The Strathspey Railway preservation organisation plans to reinstate a station at Grantown-on-Spey, with track laid as far as crossing the River Dulnain; however, the project was slowed by engineering, legal, and financial challenges. Furthermore, it would not terminate at the original Grantown West station, as this was demolished; instead, it would end at a new site closer to the centre of Grantown.

== Stations ==
- Dufftown (Keith and Dufftown Railway); opened 21 February 1862; closed 6 May 1968;
- Strathspey Junction; opened 1 July 1863; renamed Craigellachie Junction 1 June 1864; renamed Craigellachie 1897; closed 6 May 1968; junction to Morayshire Railway;
- Aberlour; opened 1 July 1863; closed 18 October 1965;
- Dailuaine Halt; opened 18 November 1933; closed 18 October 1965;
- Carron; opened 1 July 1863; closed 18 October 1965;
- Imperial Cottages Halt; opened 15 June 1959; closed 18 October 1965;
- Knockando; private; opened 1869; renamed Knockando House Halt 1905; closed 18 October 1965;
- Gilbey's Cottages Halt; opened 15 June 1959; closed 18 October 1965;
- Dalbeallie; opened 1 July 1899; renamed Knockando 1 May 1905; closed 18 October 1965;
- Blacksboat; opened 1 July 1863; closed 18 October 1965;
- Ballindalloch; opened 1 July 1863; closed 18 October 1965;
- Advie; opened 1 July 1863; closed 18 October 1965;
- Dalvey; opened 1 July 1863; closed 1 September 1868;
- Dalvey Farm Halt; opened 15 June 1959; closed 18 October 1965;
- Cromdale; opened 1 July 1863; closed 18 October 1965;
- Grantown; opened 1 July 1863; renamed Grantown-on-Spey 1 June 1912; renamed Grantown-on-Spey (East) 5 June 1950; closed 18 October 1965;
- Ballifurth Farm Halt; opened 15 June 1959; closed 18 October 1965;
- Abernethy; opened 1 July 1863; renamed Nethy Bridge 1 November 1867; closed 18 October 1965;
- Boat of Garten (Inverness and Aberdeen Junction Railway); opened 3 August 1863; closed 18 October 1965.
