= Ballindalloch railway station =

Disused railway station in Ballindalloch, Banffshire

Ballindalloch
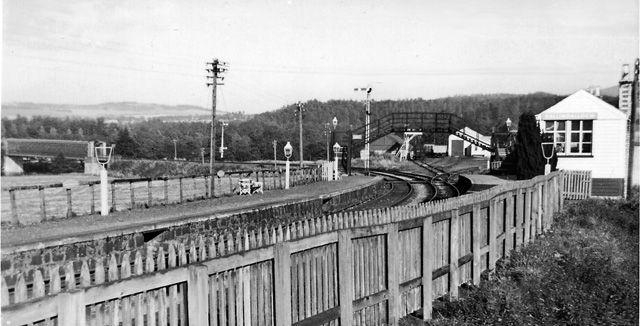
- The station in 1961

General information
- Location: Ballindalloch, Banffshire; Scotland
- Coordinates: 57.412°N 3.3886°W
- Grid reference: NJ166365
- Platforms: 2

Other information
- Status: Disused

History
- Original company: Great North of Scotland Railway
- Pre-grouping: Great North of Scotland Railway
- Post-grouping: LNER; British Rail (Scottish Region)

Key dates
- 1 July 1863: Opened
- 18 October 1965: Closed
Location

Ballindalloch railway station served the village of Ballindalloch, Banffshire, Scotland from 1863 to 1965 on the Strathspey Railway.

== History ==
The station opened on 1 July 1863 by the Great North of Scotland Railway. To the north was Cragganmore distillery, which had opened because it was close to the railway. There were two goods sheds: a two-storey goods shed that connected with the distillery and the other was in the middle of the large goods yard which was to the east. The two-storey goods shed was used to store whisky from the distillery. The station closed to both passengers and goods traffic on 18 October 1965.

Preceding station	Disused railways	Following station
Blacksboat; Line and station closed	Great North of Scotland Railway; Strathspey Railway	Advie; Line and station closed
