= Carron railway station =

Disused railway station in Speyside, Scotland

Carron
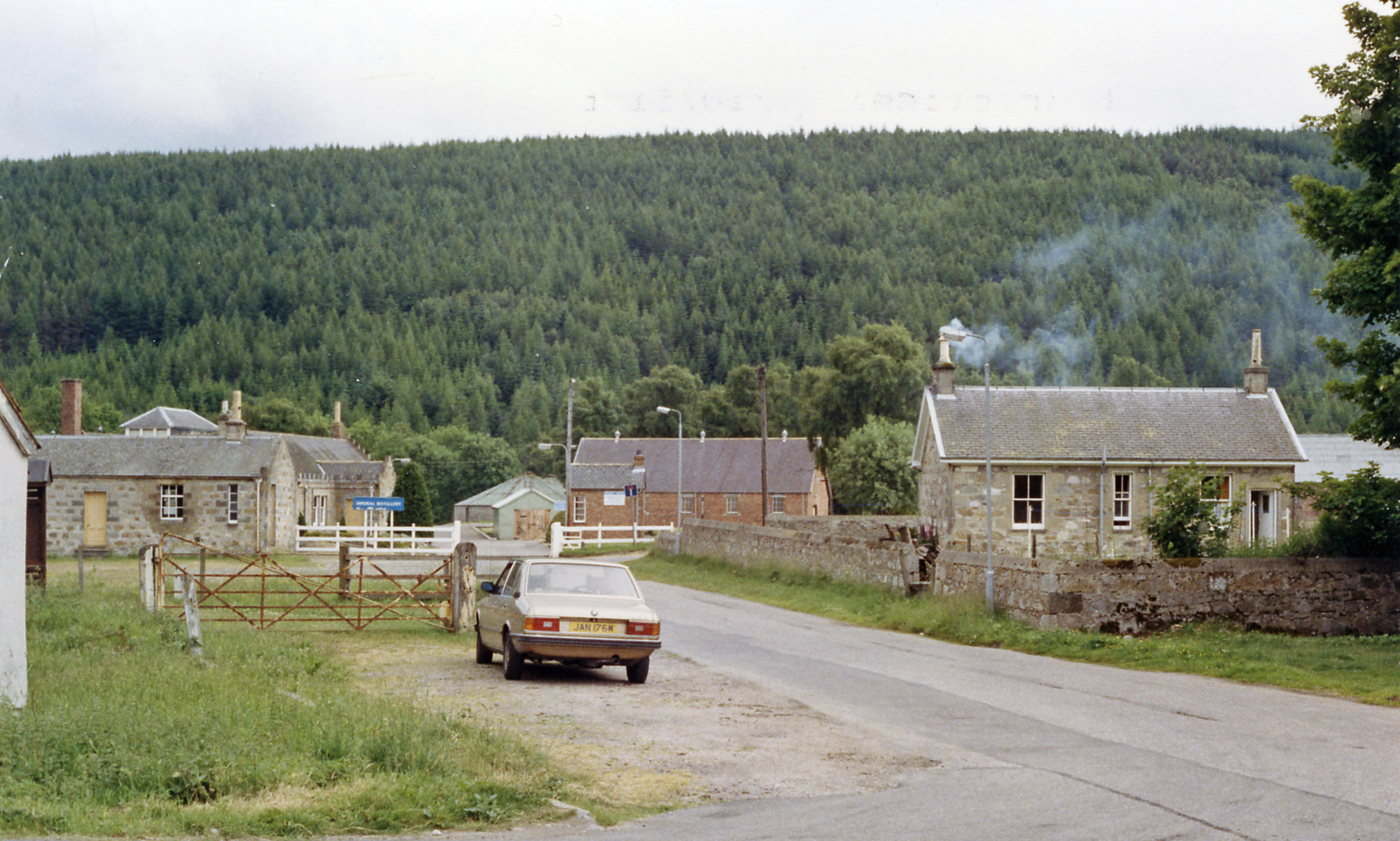
- The site of the station in 1988

General information
- Location: Carron, Speyside, Scotland
- Coordinates: 57.4554°N 3.2996°W
- Grid reference: NJ221413
- Platforms: 2

Other information
- Status: Disused

History
- Original company: Great North of Scotland Railway
- Pre-grouping: Great North of Scotland Railway
- Post-grouping: LNER; British Rail (Scottish Region)

Key dates
- 1 July 1863: Opened
- 18 October 1965: closed to passengers
- 4 November 1968: Closed completely
Location

Carron railway station served the village of Carron, Speyside, Scotland, from 1863 to 1968 on the Strathspey Railway.

== History ==
The station opened on 1 July 1863 by the Great North of Scotland Railway. When it opened, there was only one platform but another was later added. To the north was a goods yard and to the west were sidings that served the Imperial distillery. The station closed to both passengers on 18 October 1965 and closed to goods on 4 November 1968. The signal box has survived.

Preceding station	Disused railways	Following station
Dailuiane Halt; Line and station closed	Great North of Scotland Railway; Strathspey Railway	Imperial Cottages Halt; Line and station closed
