= Dandaleith railway station =

Disused railway station in Craigellachie, Moray

Coordinates: 57°29′55″N 3°11′28″W

Dandaleith
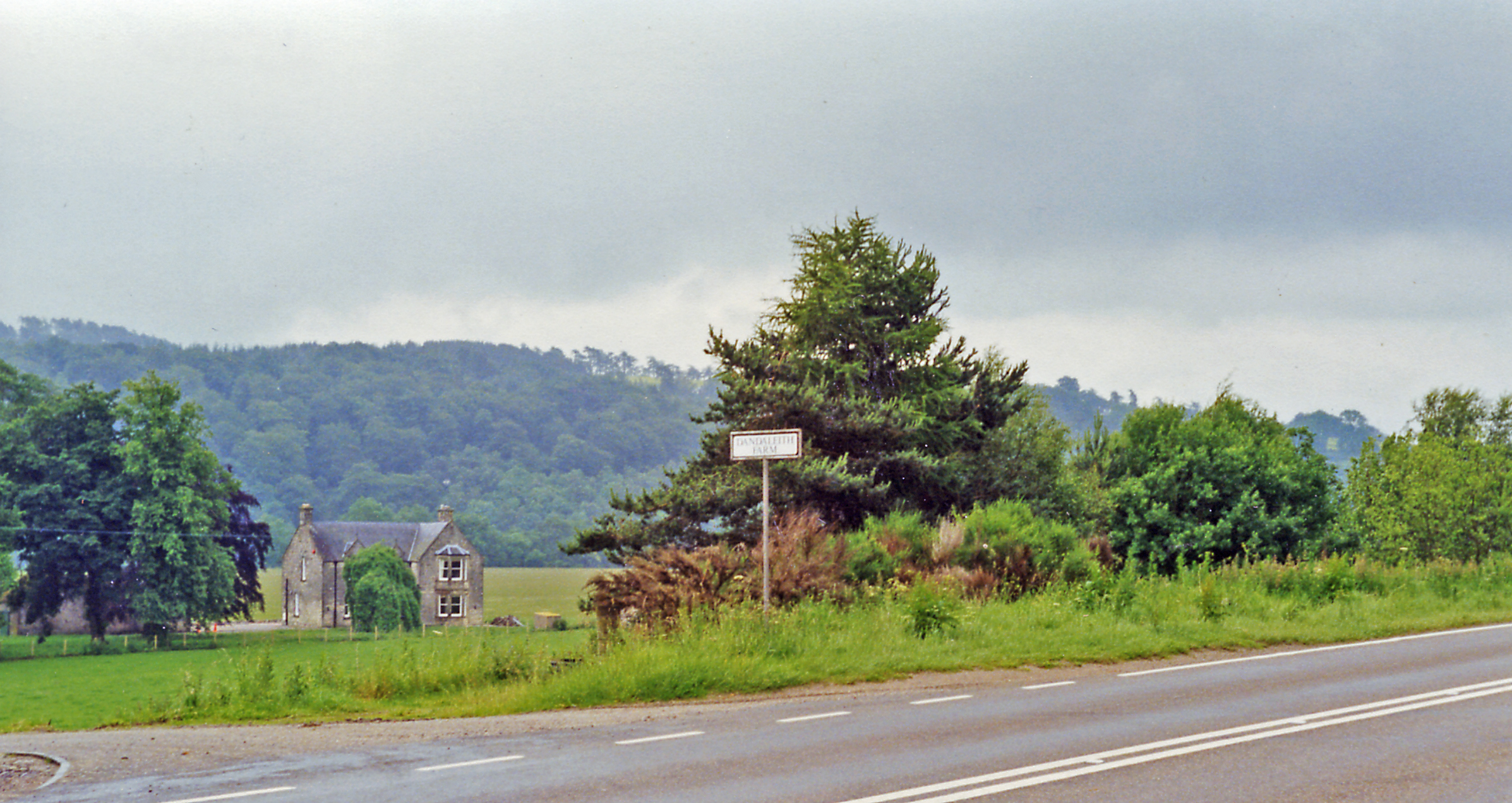
- The site of the station, looking east, in 1997

General information
- Location: Craigellachie, Moray; Scotland
- Platforms: 1

Other information
- Status: Disused

History
- Original company: Great North of Scotland Railway
- Pre-grouping: Great North of Scotland Railway
- Post-grouping: LNER

Key dates
- 23 December 1858: Opened as Craigellachie
- 1864: Name changed to Dandaleith
- 5 March 1962: Closed to passengers
- 18 November 1965: Closed to goods
Location

Dandaleith railway station served the village of Craigellachie, Moray, Scotland from 1858 to 1965 on the Morayshire Railway.

== History ==
The station opened as Craigellachie on 23 December 1858 by the Great North of Scotland Railway. It was the southern terminus of the line until Craigellachie opened in 1863. To the north was a goods yard. The station's name was changed to Dandaleith in 1864 to avoid confusion with the Craigellachie station that opened to the south a year before. It was downgraded to an unstaffed halt in 1931, although it became staffed after 7 June 1953. Eventually, only one train a day called at the station and it closed to both passengers on 5 March 1962 and closed to goods traffic on 18 November 1965.

Preceding station	Disused railways	Following station
Rothes; Line and station closed	Morayshire Railway	Craigellachie; Line and station closed
