= Craigellachie railway station =

Disused railway station in Craigellachie, Moray

Craigellachie
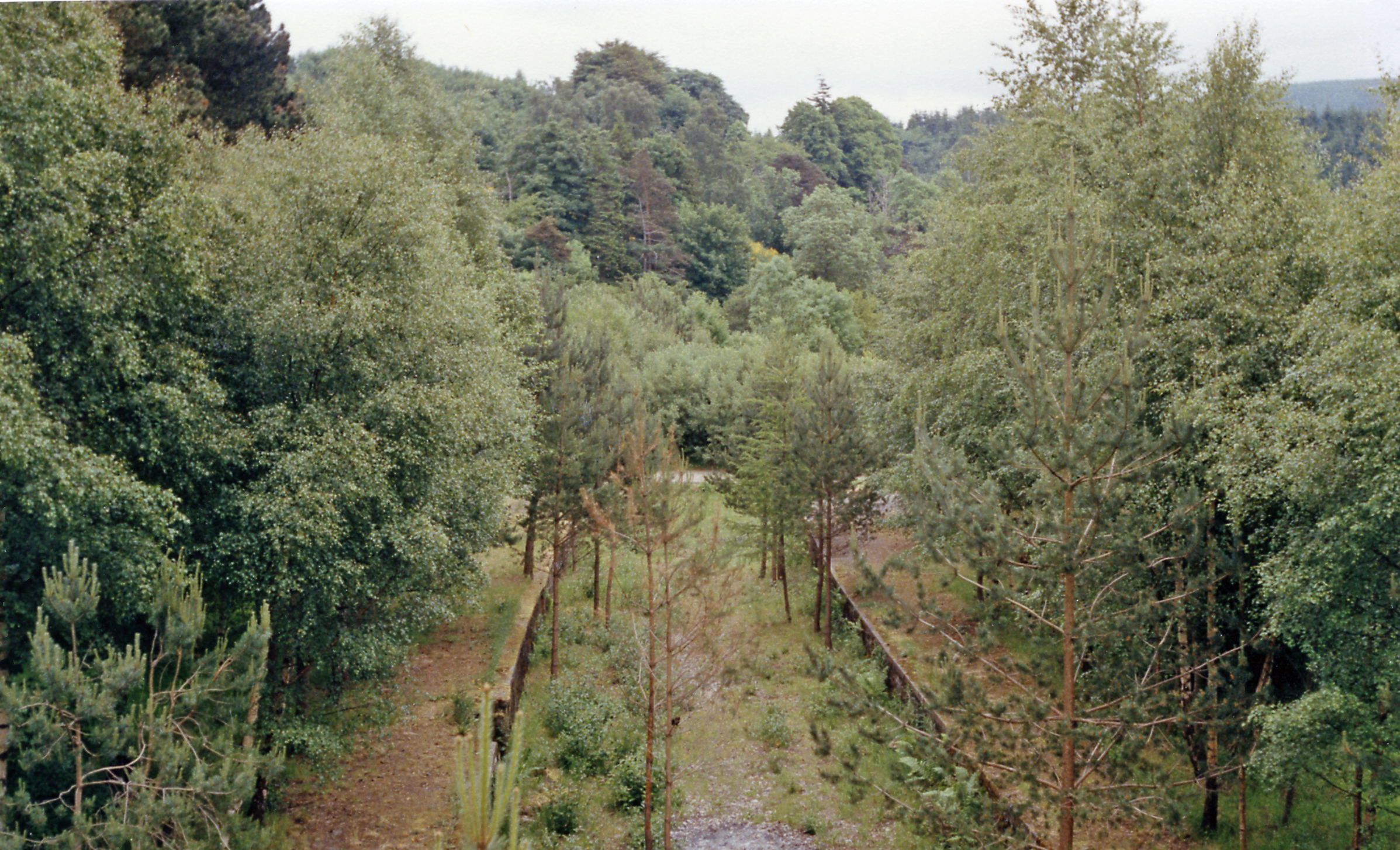
- The site of the station in 1988

General information
- Location: Craigellachie, Moray; Scotland
- Coordinates: 57.491°N 3.1821°W
- Grid reference: NT292451
- Platforms: 3

Other information
- Status: Disused

History
- Original company: Great North of Scotland Railway
- Pre-grouping: Great North of Scotland Railway
- Post-grouping: LNER; British Rail (Scottish Region)

Key dates
- 1 July 1863: Opened as Strathspey Junction
- 1 June 1864: Name changed to Craigellachie
- 6 May 1968: Closed to passengers
- 4 November 1968: Closed completely
Location

Craigellachie railway station served the village of Craigellachie, Moray, Scotland from 1863 to 1968 on the Morayshire Railway and the Strathspey Railway.

== History ==
The station opened as Strathspey Junction on 1 July 1863 by the Great North of Scotland Railway. It was renamed Craigellachie on 1 June 1864. There was a large goods yard to the west. The station closed to passengers on 6 May 1968 and to goods traffic on 4 November 1968.

== Accidents ==
On 13 April 1907 Newton bridge, to the south of the station, was having its girders replaced. A rail-mounted hand-crane lifting one of the girders toppled over. Crane and girder fell to the river bed 25ft below. Great North of Scotland Railway workers William Riach, George Cormie and Charles Petrie died. Charles Noble and George Calder were injured.

Preceding station	Disused railways	Following station
Aberlour	Great North of Scotland Railway; Strathspey Railway	Dufftown
Dandaleith; Line and station closed	Great North of Scotland Railway; Morayshire Railway	Terminus
