= Knockando House Halt railway station =

Former railway station in Scotland

Knockando House Halt

General information
- Location: Knockando, Moray; Scotland
- Platforms: 1

Other information
- Status: Disused

History
- Original company: Great North of Scotland Railway
- Pre-grouping: Great North of Scotland Railway
- Post-grouping: LNER; British Rail (Scottish Region)

Key dates
- 1 September 1869: Opened as Knockando
- 1 May 1905: Opened as Knockando House Platform
- ?: Name changed to Knockando House Halt
- 18 October 1965: Closed
Location

Knockando House Halt railway station served the village of Knockando, Moray, Scotland from 1869 to 1965 by the Strathspey Railway.

== History ==
The station was a private station, serving Knockando House, opening as Knockando on 1 September 1869 by the Great North of Scotland Railway. Its name was changed to Knockando House Platform on 1 May 1905 and later changing to Knockando House Halt. It was closed on 18 October 1965.

Preceding station	Historical railways	Following station
Imperial Cottages Halt; Line and station closed	Great North of Scotland Railway; Strathspey Railway	Gilbey's Cottages Halt; Line and station closed
