= Dailuaine Halt railway station =

Disused railway station in Carron, Speyside

Dailuaine Halt
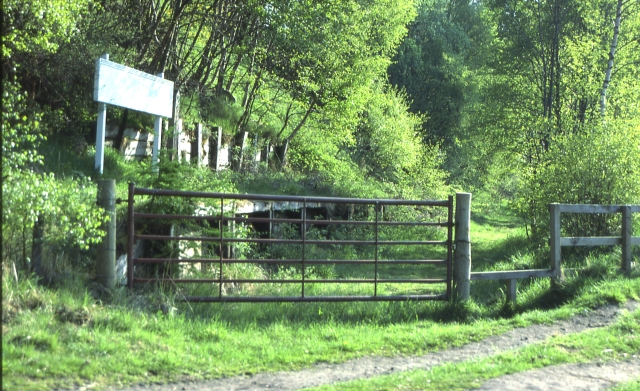
- The site of the station in 1984

General information
- Location: Carron; Scotland
- Grid reference: NJ286460
- Platforms: 1

Other information
- Status: Disused

History
- Original company: LNER
- Post-grouping: LNER

Key dates
- 18 November 1933: Opened
- 18 October 1965: Closed
Location

Dailuaine Halt railway station served the village of Carron, Scotland from 1933 to 1965 on the Strathspey Railway.

== History ==
The station opened on 18 November 1933 by the LNER. It was situated near Dailuaine distillery and 2.5 miles from Aberlour. The station closed to both passengers and goods on 18 October 1965.

Preceding station	Disused railways	Following station
Aberlour; Line and station closed	London and North Eastern Railway; Strathspey Railway	Carron; Line and station closed
