= Dalvey Farm Halt railway station =

Former railway station in Scotland

Coordinates: 57°22′17″N 3°28′44″W

Dalvey Farm Halt

General information
- Location: Highland; Scotland
- Platforms: 1

Other information
- Status: Disused

History
- Post-grouping: Scottish Region of British Railways

Key dates
- 15 June 1959: Station opens
- 18 October 1965: Station closes
Location

Dalvey Farm Halt railway station was one of four halts, Imperial Cottages, Gilbey's Cottages, Dalvey Farm, and Ballifurth Farm, opened on the Speyside route between Elgin and Aviemore on 15 June 1959, on the introduction of railbuses. Drivers were warned when approaching the halts by white boards stating 'Request Stop 100 Yards Ahead'.

== History ==
Opened by the Scottish Region of British Railways in 1959, it was then closed by the British Railways Board when services on the line were withdrawn in 1965.

Preceding station	Disused railways	Following station
Advie	Scottish Region of British Railways; Strathspey Line	Cromdale
