= Blacksboat railway station =

Disused railway station in Blacksboat, Banffshire

Blacksboat
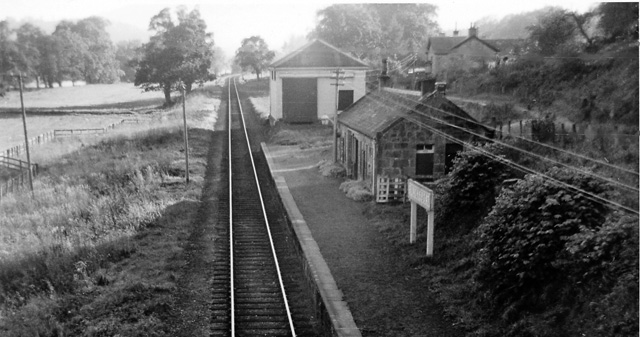
- The station in 1961

General information
- Location: Ballindalloch, Banffshire; Scotland
- Coordinates: 57.4335°N 3.3621°W
- Grid reference: NJ183389
- Platforms: 1

Other information
- Status: Disused

History
- Original company: Strathspey
- Pre-grouping: Great North of Scotland Railway
- Post-grouping: LNER

Key dates
- 1 July 1863: Opened
- 18 October 1965: Closed
Location

Blacksboat railway station served the village of Ballindalloch, Banffshire, Scotland from 1863 to 1965 on the Strathspey Railway.

== History ==
The station opened on 1 July 1863 by the Strathspey Railway. It had a rectangular-shaped building and a wooden goods shed. The station closed to both passengers and goods traffic on 18 October 1965.

| Preceding station | Historical railways | Following station |
|---|---|---|
| Knockando (Dalbeallie); Line and station closed | Strathspey Railway (GNoSR) | Ballindalloch; Line and station closed |
