= Nikolai Orlov (pianist) =

Russian pianist

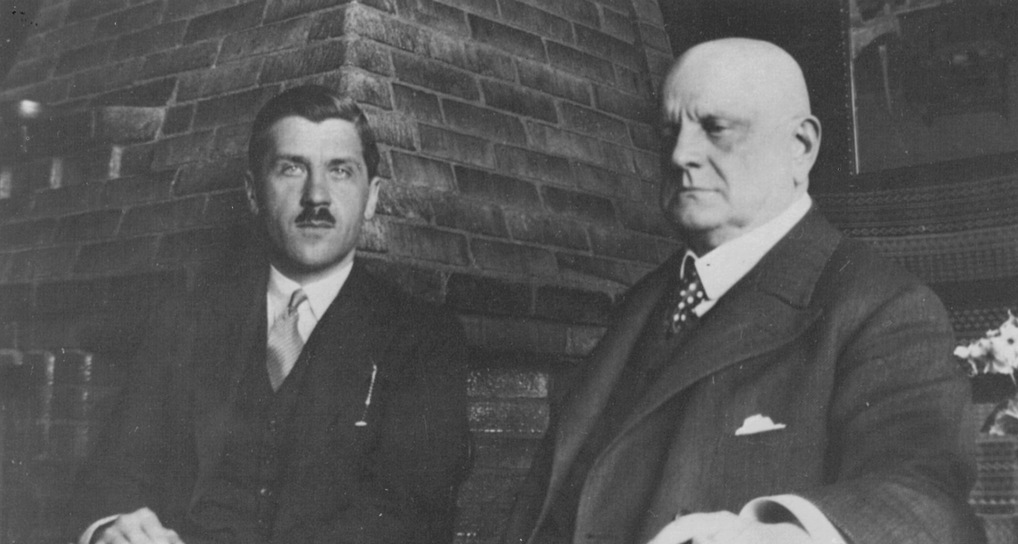
Nikolai Orlov visiting Jean Sibelius in 1931 in Ainola, Finland.

Nikolai Andreyevich Orlov (Russian: Николай Андреевич Орлов; 26 February (J: 14 February) 1892 in Yelets, Oryol Governorate, Russian Empire – 31 May 1964 in Grantown-on-Spey, Scotland, United Kingdom) was a Russian pianist who was appreciated especially for his interpretations of Frédéric Chopin.

Nikolai Orlov studied piano at Moscow and graduated from Moscow Conservatory on 1910. He also studied privately composition and counterpoint with Sergei Taneyev. His first public concert was held in 1912, and he gave the première of the first piano concerto of Alexander Glazunov in the same year.

Orlov worked as teacher in Moscow in 1913–1921 and then moved to West. He made several successful concert tours around the world, and in 1948 he settled in Grantown-on-Spey in Scotland.

== Sources ==
- The New Grove Dictionary of Music and Musicians 18, pp. 706–707. London 2000.
