= Advie railway station =

Railway station in Morayshire, Scotland

Coordinates: 57.39305°N 3.45351°W

Advie
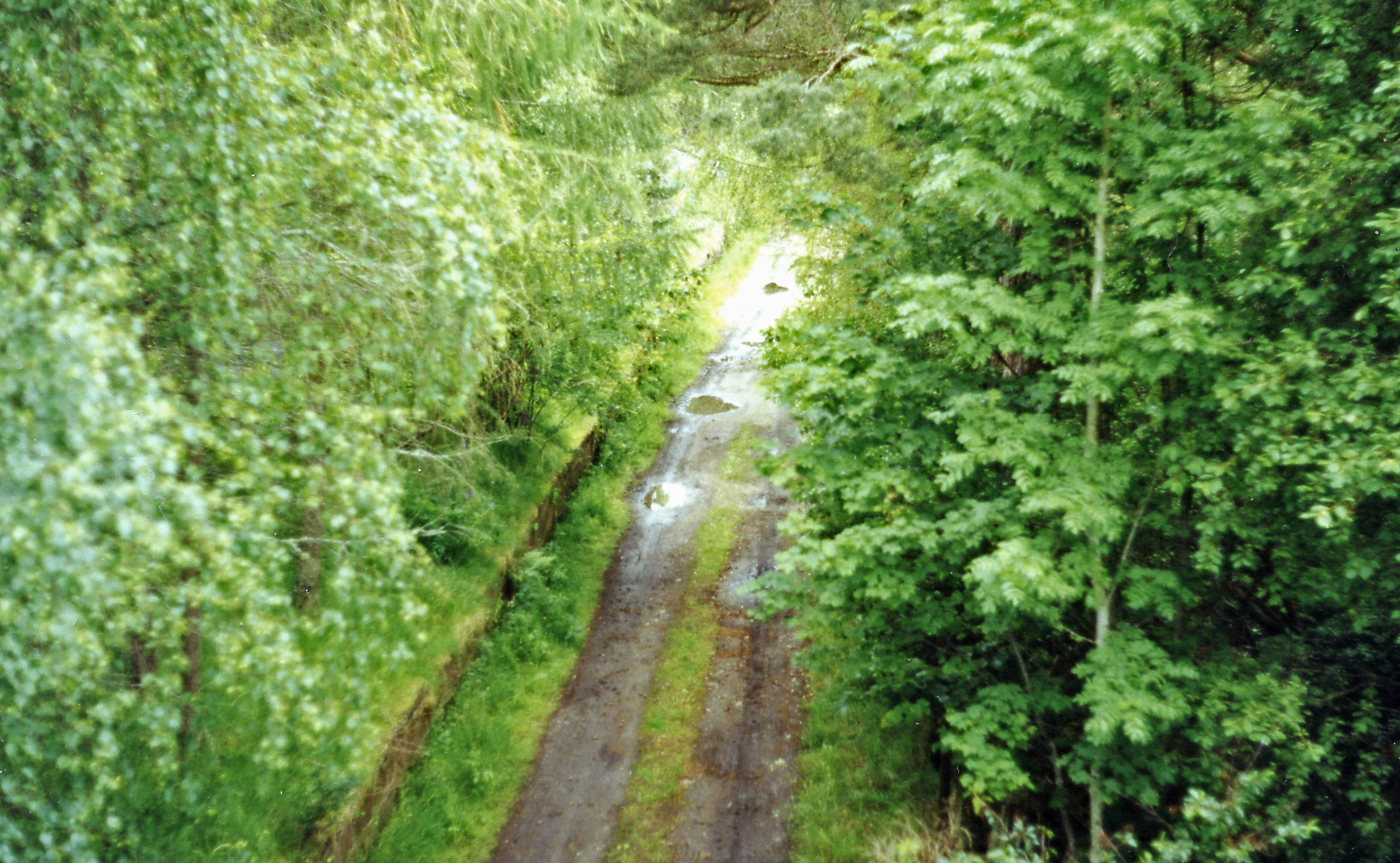
- Advie station site in 1997

General information
- Location: Advie, Highland; Scotland
- Platforms: 1

Other information
- Status: Disused

History
- Original company: Strathspey Railway
- Pre-grouping: Great North of Scotland Railway
- Post-grouping: London and North Eastern Railway

Key dates
- 1 July 1863: First station opens
- 1 September 1868: Station replaced 1.21 km due west
- 18 October 1965: Station closes
Location

Advie railway station served the village of Advie, Morayshire, in Scotland.

== History ==
Opened by the Strathspey Railway (GNoSR), it was absorbed by the Great North of Scotland Railway. Then station passed on to the London and North Eastern Railway during the Grouping of 1923. Passing to the Scottish Region of British Railways on nationalisation in 1948, it was then closed by the British Railways Board.

Preceding station	Disused railways	Following station
Ballindalloch	Great North of Scotland Railway; Strathspey Railway	Dalvey Farm Halt
