= Cromdale =

Coordinates: 57.33668°N 3.53993°W

Cromdale: Scottish Gaelic: Cromdhail
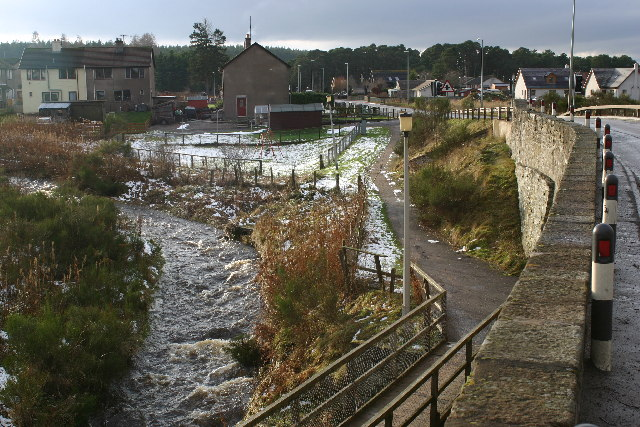

- Location within the Highland council area
- OS grid reference: NJ074284
- Council area: Highland
- Lieutenancy area: Inverness
- Country: Scotland
- Sovereign state: United Kingdom
- Post town: GRANTOWN-ON-SPEY
- Postcode district: PH26
- Police: Scotland
- Fire: Scottish
- Ambulance: Scottish
- UK Parliament: Moray West, Nairn and Strathspey
- Scottish Parliament: Inverness and Nairn

Cromdale (Scottish Gaelic: Cromdhail, from crom 'crooked' and dal 'valley, dale') is a village in Strathspey, in the Highland council area of Scotland, and one of the ancient parishes which formed the combined ecclesiastical (later civil) parish of Cromdale, Inverallan and Advie in Morayshire.

The present small, growing village of Cromdale lies on either side of where the A95 road crosses Cromdale Burn, between Grantown-on-Spey and Aberlour; this bridge is about 500 metres (550 yd) south of the confluence of the burn with the River Spey.

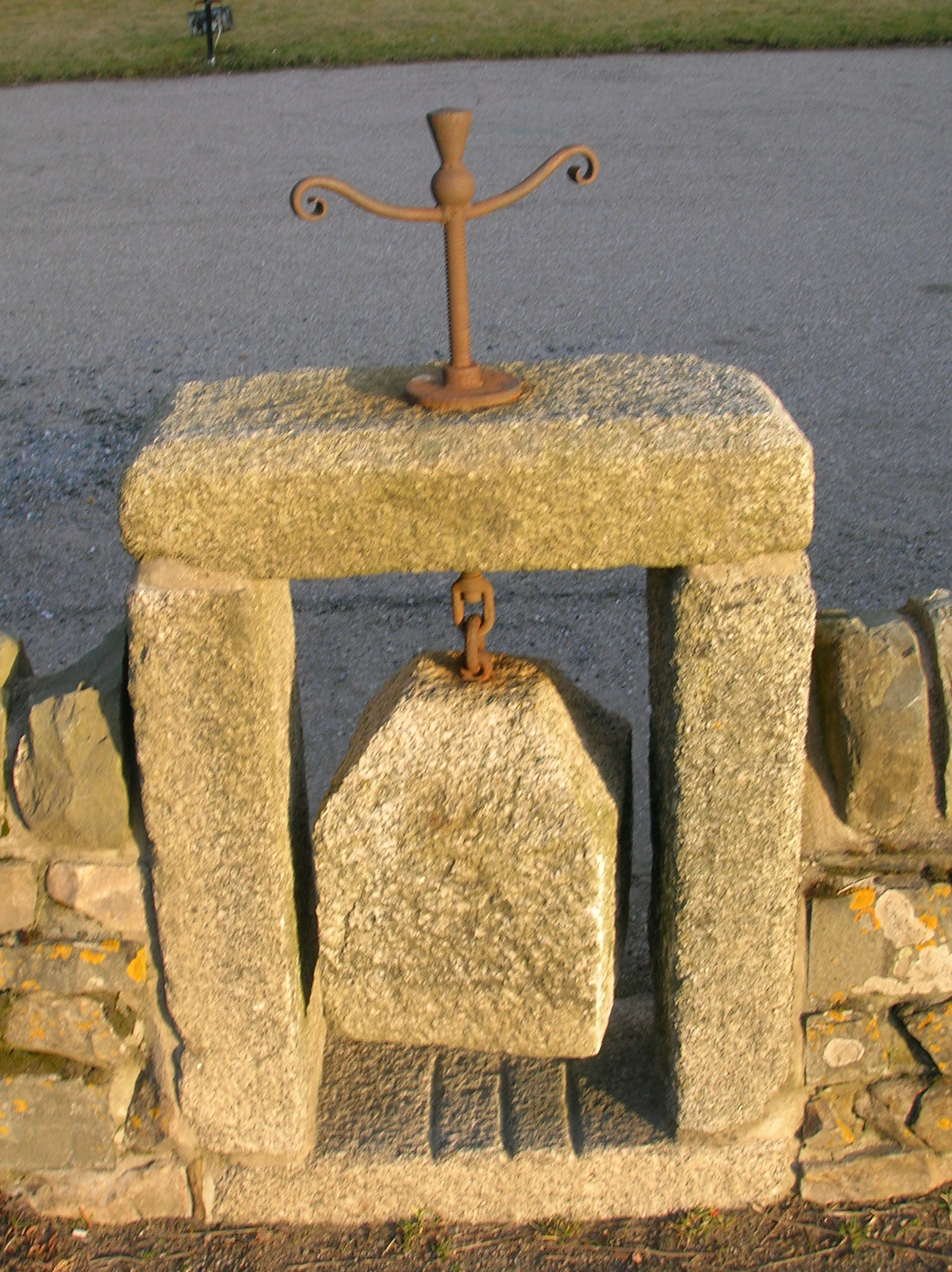
An old cheese press built into a wall opposite the Cromdale Outdoor Education Centre.

The village was within Inverness-shire until 1869, when it was moved by the Inverness and Elgin County Boundaries Act 1870 to the Morayshire. It remained part of Morayshire until 1975, when the county was divided between the Highland and Grampian regions; it is now within the Highland Council Area. The village retained Morayshire as its official postal address for many years after the change in local government boundaries.

The parish church and cemetery are located beside the River Spey at the end of Kirk Road beside the bridge which is the latest of three which replaced the nearby ferry. The bridge was financed by local residents, having been obtained as a War Surplus item from the War Office and erected in 1922 at a cost of £6,889. The remains of an older bridge can be seen a short distance upstream; this (much lighter) bridge was swept away in 1894, the 1922 bridge replaced one that collapsed in 1921.

About halfway along Kirk Road is Cromdale railway station, which closed in the 1960s but survives in private hands along with some preserved railway paraphernalia. It lies on the route of the now closed Great North of Scotland Railway line from Boat of Garten to Craigellachie.

To the south of Cromdale is Balmenach Distillery, which was served by a branch line running from Cromdale station that passed under the main road alongside Cromdale Burn. This distillery has had a chequered history in recent years but is again in production.

The old school had become the Cromdale Outdoor Education Centre and stands opposite the Haugh Hotel.

The Battle of Cromdale took place in 1690 on the Haughs of Cromdale, about 2 miles (3 km) east of the village.

The village is within the Cairngorms National Park.

== Football ==
Cromdale has two teams, Spey Valley United, who compete in the Scottish Junior Football North Division One (West). The other team is Cromdale F.C., who compete in the local Strathspey & Badenoch Welfare FA league. Both clubs use Cromdale's public football ground for all home matches.

== Place name in historical records ==
=== Censuses ===
In various census and derived records, "Cromdale" was also used to refer to the entire civil parish of Cromdale, Inverallan and Advie, often causing an apparent mismatch between different censuses. In the 1841, 1851 and 1861 censuses, the intended locality can only be reliably determined from the descriptions on the census book pages or by the names of known locations. From 1871 onward, a record marked as being within parish number 128/2, 128B/2 or 128B^{2} is not in Cromdale but rather in Inverallan (which contains Grantown). Advie was always enumerated with Cromdale, requiring the relevant parish to be identified from the address or description.

=== Birth, marriage and death registrations ===
In 1855, a single registration district named "Cromdale, Inverallan and Advie" included all the combined parishes. From 1856 to 1965, the local registration district was "Cromdale and Advie". From 1966, Cromdale was inside the "Grantown on Spey" registration district. Record indexes maintained by the LDS church and other third parties have failed to distinguish the 1856 separation of records in their indexes, thus their descriptions of the registration districts do not match the official descriptions.
