= Ballifurth Farm Halt railway station =

Railway station in Highland, Scotland

Coordinates: 57.29225°N 3.63790°W

Ballifurth Farm Halt

General information
- Location: Highland; Scotland
- Platforms: 1

Other information
- Status: Disused

History
- Original company: Scottish Region of British Railways

Key dates
- 15 June 1959: Station opens
- 11 October 1965: Station closes
Location

Ballifurth Farm Halt railway station was one of four halts, Imperial Cottages Halt, Gilbey's Cottages Halt, Dalvey Farm Halt, and Ballifurth Farm Halt, opened on the Speyside route between Elgin and Aviemore, Scotland, on 15 June 1959, on the introduction of railbuses. Drivers were warned when approaching the halts by white boards stating 'Request Stop 100 Yards Ahead'.

== History ==
Opened by the Scottish Region of British Railways in 1959, it was then closed by the British Railways Board when services on the line were withdrawn in 1965.

== The site today ==
The track bed is now Speyside Way.

Preceding station	Disused railways	Following station
Grantown-on-Spey East	Scottish Region of British Railways	Nethy Bridge
