= Advie =

Village in Highland, Scotland

Coordinates: 57.392028°N 3.456564°W

Advie: Scottish Gaelic: Àbhaidh
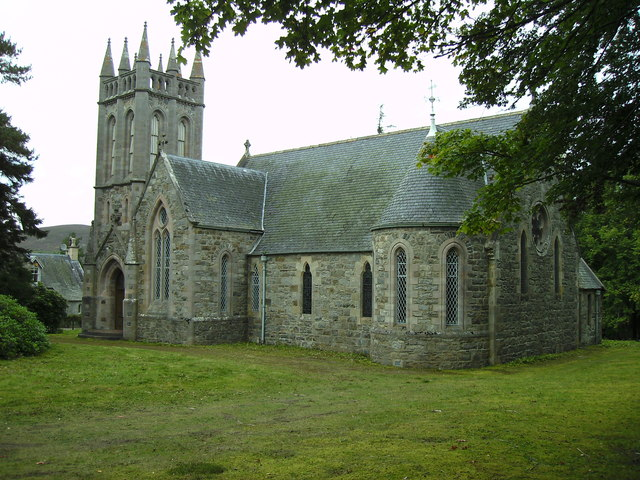

- Location within the Badenoch and Strathspey area
- OS grid reference: NJ125344
- Council area: Highland
- Country: Scotland
- Sovereign state: United Kingdom
- Post town: GRANTOWN-ON-SPEY
- Postcode district: PH26
- Police: Scotland
- Fire: Scottish
- Ambulance: Scottish

Advie (Scottish Gaelic: Àbhaidh) is a small village in Strathspey, in the Highland Council Area of Scotland. It lies to the south of the River Spey, and next to the A95 road, roughly halfway between Grantown-on-Spey and Aberlour.

== History ==
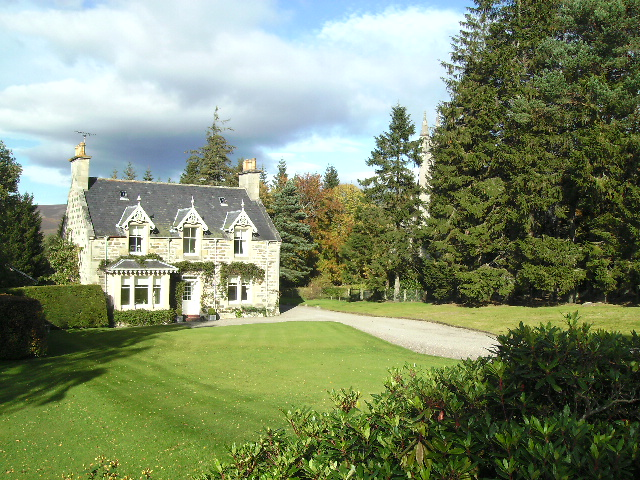
The Manse

Advie was in the County of Moray, within the ecclesiastical parish and civil parish of "Cromdale, Inverallan and Advie". Although the ecclesiastical parish was combined in the sixteenth century, the village still has its own church and an old cemetery. A fragment of a Class I Pictish Stone - believed to have been found in the old burial ground - is now preserved in the vestry wall of the present church. Another building of note is The Manse, located nearby.

The village was served by Advie railway station, on the Strathspey Railway. The station opened in 1863, but closed, along with the rest of the line, in 1965.
