= Inverallan =

Parish in Morayshire, Scotland

Coordinates: 57.329°N 3.610°W

Inverallan is a former parish in Morayshire in Scotland. It is generally equivalent to the area now known as Grantown.

At an unknown date before the Reformation, it joined with the parishes of Cromdale and Advie to form the parish of "Cromdale, Inverallan and Advie" (mainly in Invernessshire), which later became a civil parish and in which Inverallen remained until 1869. Grantown was founded there in 1765.
