= Carron Bridge (Sutherland, Scotland) =

Bridge in West Scotland

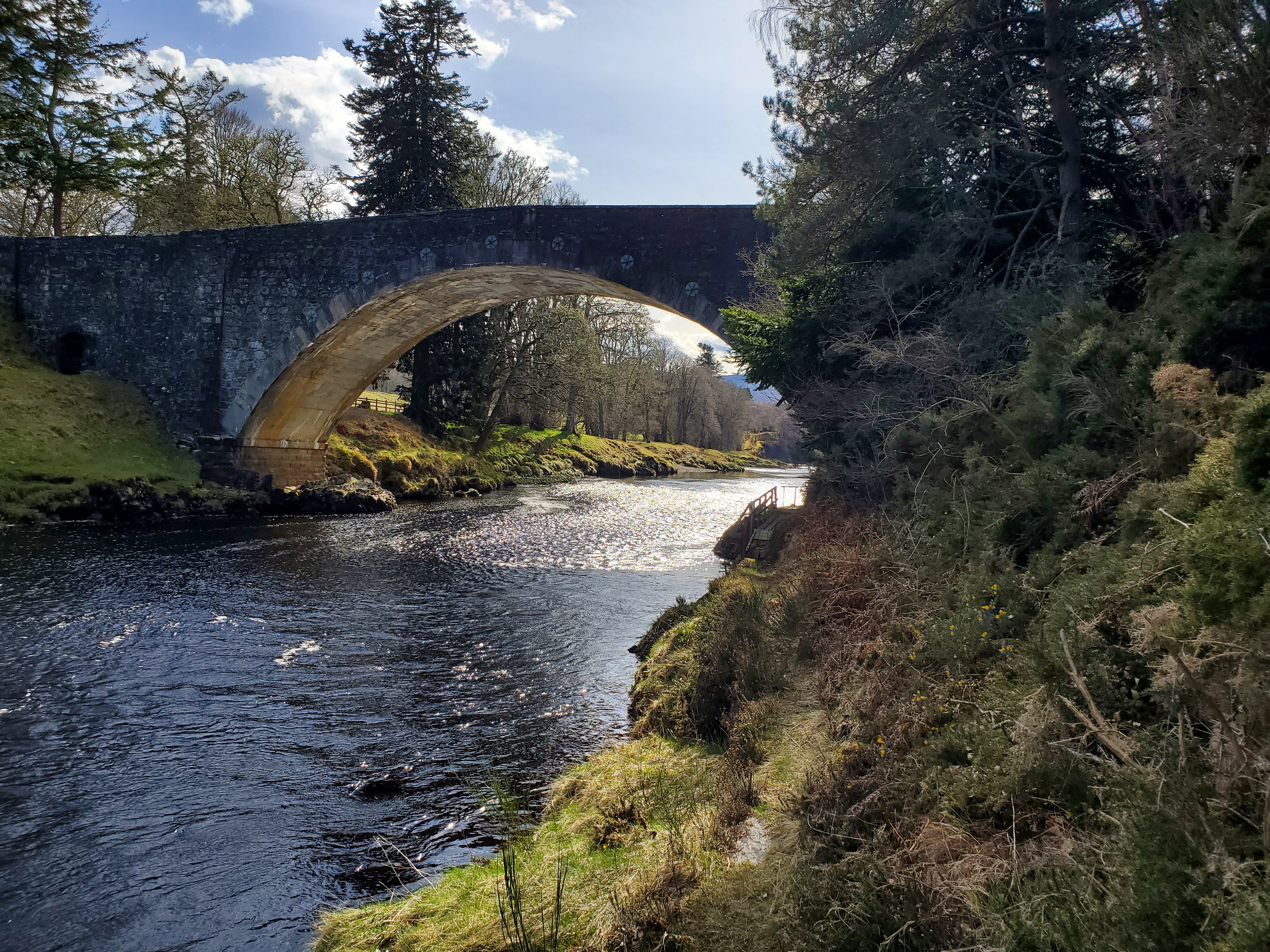
- East side of Carron Bridge
- Coordinates: 57°53′9.83″N 4°23′15.26″W
- Crosses: River Carron

Characteristics
- Material: Stone
- Longest span: 20 metres (66 ft)
- No. of spans: 1

History
- Designer: Second District of Roads Ross-shire
- Opened: 1818

Listed Building – Category B
- Official name: Carron Bridge Over River Carron
- Designated: 17 March 1971
- Reference no.: LB7167

Location
- Interactive map of Carron Bridge

The Carron Bridge is a bridge over the River Carron near Ardgay in Sutherland, Scotland.

== Description ==
The Carron Bridge is located near the town of Ardgay in Sutherland, Scotland. It is a single span bridge of traditional stone construction. Notable are the plaque on the east side outer wall, a cattle and walker tunnel on the bridge south side, ten distinctive metal repair stays, and the unusual supported footpath that runs around the base of the bridge on the north side.

== History ==
The bridge was constructed in 1818. A plaque in the outer wall at the middle of the bridge on the east side has a faint inscription which reads "This bridge was erected by the Second District of Roads Ross-Shire 1818 Alex (illegible)".

== See also ==
- List of bridges in Scotland
