= Grantown-on-Spey (East) railway station =

Heritage railway station in Scotland

Grantown-on-Spey (East)
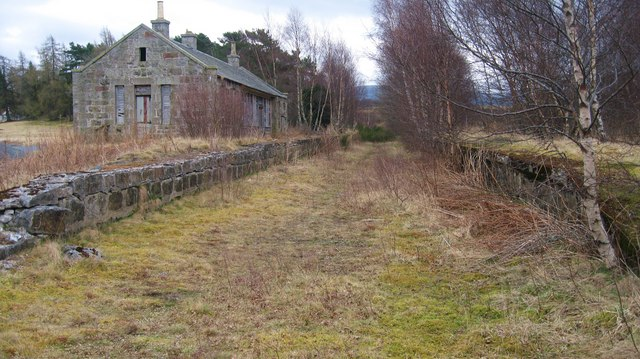
- Site of the station, 2008

General information
- Location: Grantown-on-Spey, Highland; Scotland
- Coordinates: 57.316°N 3.598°W
- Grid reference: NJ038261
- Platforms: 2

Other information
- Status: Disused

History
- Original company: Strathspey Railway
- Pre-grouping: Great North of Scotland Railway
- Post-grouping: London and North Eastern Railway

Key dates
- 1 July 1863: Station opens
- 18 October 1965: closed for passengers
- 2 November 1968: Station closed completely
Location

Grantown-on-Spey (East) railway station served the town of Grantown-on-Spey, in Scotland. It was one of two railway stations serving the town, the other being Grantown-on-Spey (West).

It was situated to the south-east of the town, on the opposite side of the River Spey.

== Restoration ==
In 2015 Revack Lodge Estate announced plans to develop the station site as a heritage centre. This will involve renovating the old station buildings into a craft shop, and converting an old railway carriage into a cafe. It will also feature a Highland games demonstration area.

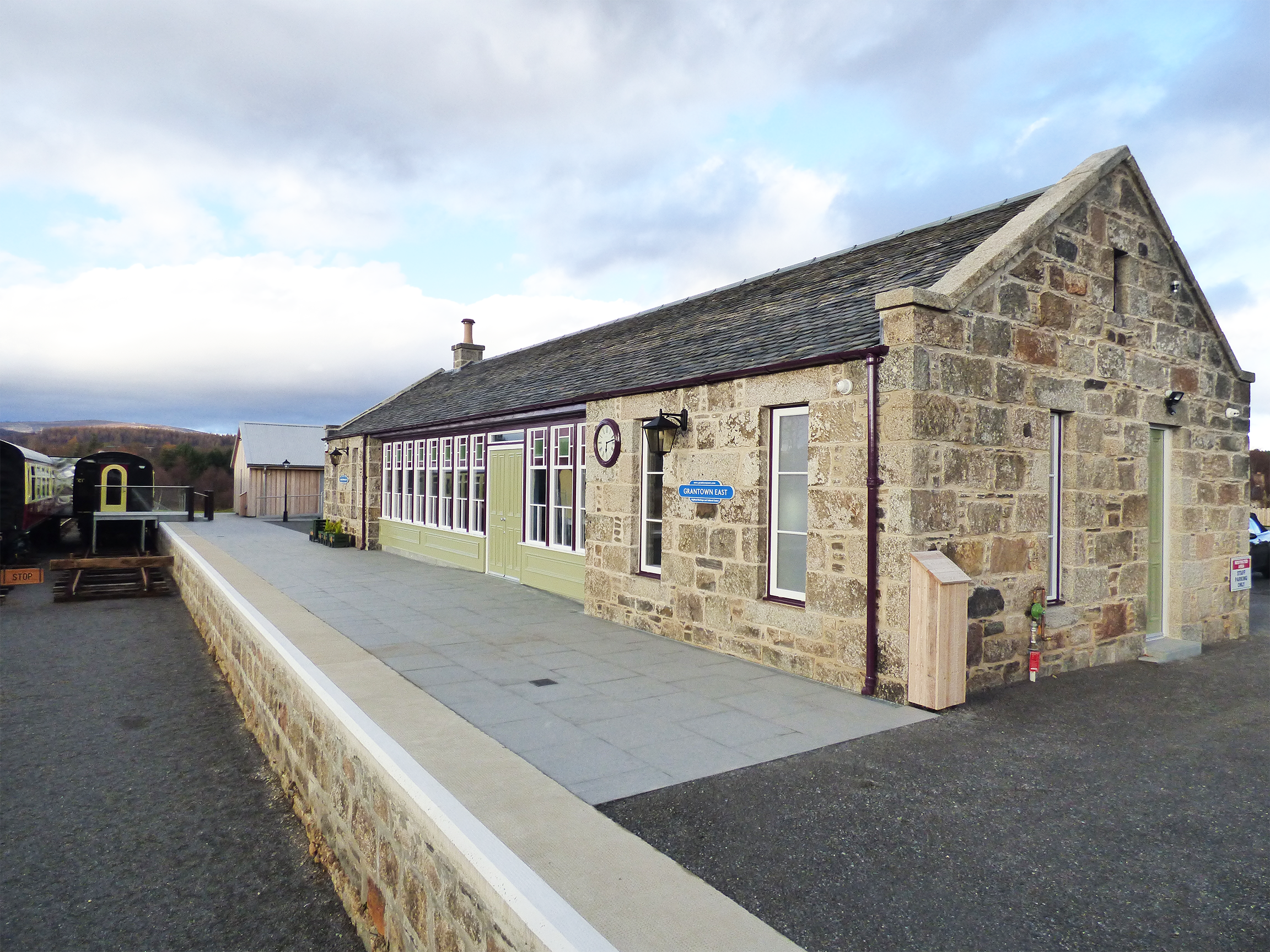
Grantown East: Highland Heritage & Cultural Centre

Revack Estate owner Karen Blessington is behind the redevelopment of the derelict former Speyside Line station into Grantown East the Highland Heritage and Cultural Centre. In 2018 the renovations to the former Grantown East station were complete. The station reopened as the Highland Heritage and Cultural Centre exactly fifty years after the last train passed through.

Preceding station	Disused railways	Following station
Cromdale	Great North of Scotland Railway; Strathspey Railway	Ballifurth Farm Halt
