= Cromdale railway station =

Former railway station in Scotland

Coordinates: 57.3388°N 3.5448°W

Cromdale
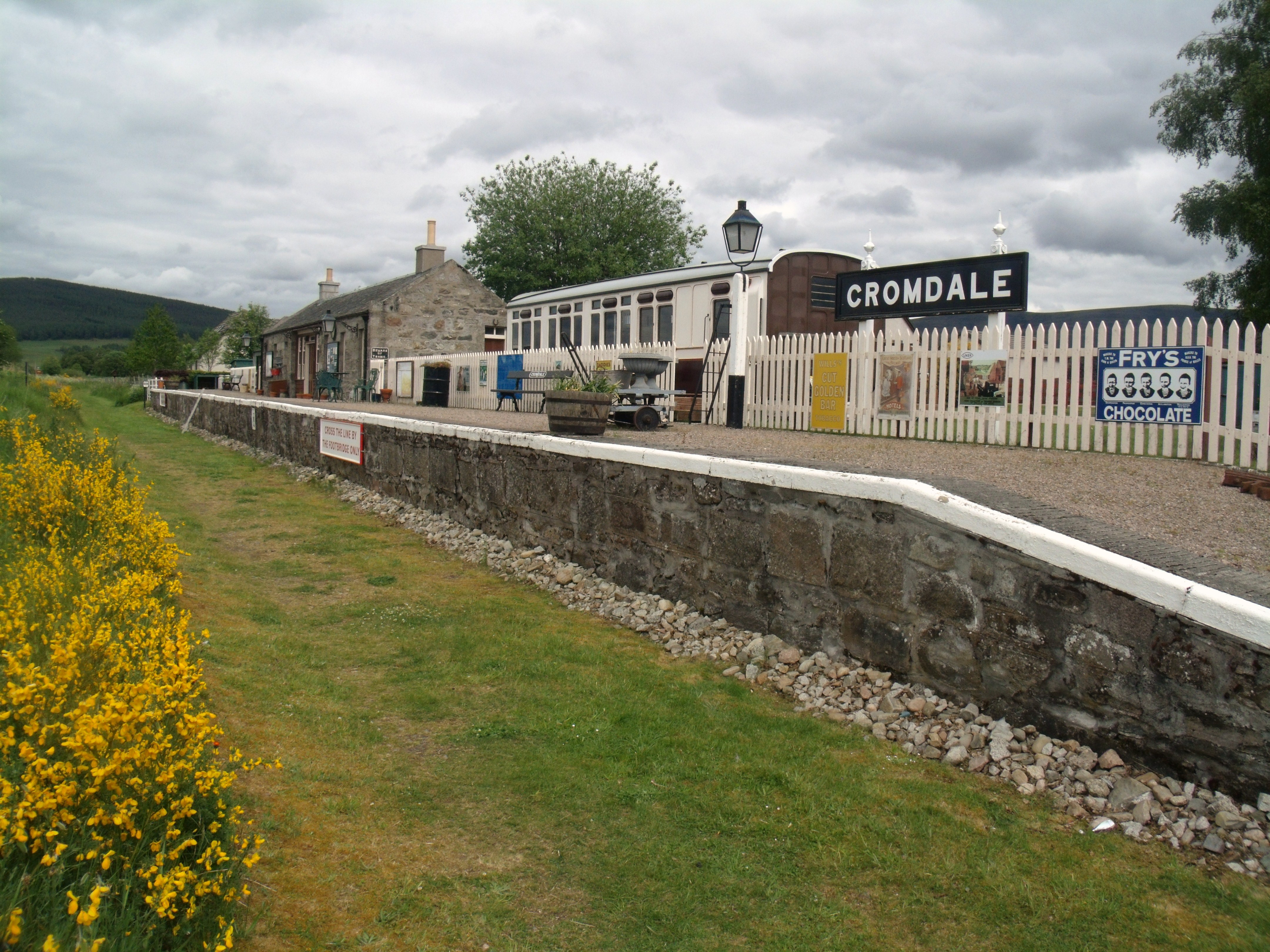
- Cromdale station, 2012

General information
- Location: Cromdale, Highland; Scotland

Other information
- Status: Disused

History
- Original company: Strathspey Railway
- Pre-grouping: Great North of Scotland Railway
- Post-grouping: London and North Eastern Railway

Key dates
- 1 July 1863: Station opens
- 18 October 1965: Station closes
Location

Cromdale railway station served the village of Cromdale, Highland, in Scotland.

== History ==
The station was opened by the Strathspey Railway (GNoSR) on 1 July 1863. It was absorbed by the Great North of Scotland Railway. Then station passed on to the London and North Eastern Railway during the Grouping of 1923. Passing to the Scottish Region of British Railways on nationalisation in 1948.

The station was host to a LNER camping coach from 1935 to 1939 and possibly one for some of 1934. A camping coach was also positioned here by the Scottish Region from 1954 to 1955.

The station is on the route of the Speyside Way long-distance path and has been restored as a private dwelling with an external appearance close to that of the original Great North of Scotland design. A restored carriage body built at the Inverurie works in 1916 stands behind the platform.

A private 1.5 mile railway line ran from the station yard to Balmenach Distillery, opening in 1897 and closing in 1968. It also closed from 1941 to 1947 when the distillery re-opened following expansion. The Barclay 'pug' locomotive 'Balmenach' which worked the line is now preserved at Boat of Garten on the StrathspeyRailway.

The station closed to passengers on 18 October 1965 but the line was still open to freight until 4 November 1968.

The Station, along with a preserved carriage, games room and art studio is now a holiday letting.

== Sources ==
- Atterbury, Paul (2009). All Change! Basingstoke : AA Publishing. ISBN 978-0-7495-5785-0.
- Hurst, Geoffrey (1992). Register of Closed Railways: 1948-1991. Worksop, Nottinghamshire: Milepost Publications. ISBN 0-9477-9618-5.
- Jackson, Richard (2006). The Speyside Line. Pub. privately. ISBN 0-902343-17-3.
- McRae, Andrew (1997). British Railway Camping Coach Holidays: The 1930s & British Railways (London Midland Region). Vol. Scenes from the Past: 30 (Part One). Foxline. ISBN 1-870119-48-7.
- McRae, Andrew (1998). British Railways Camping Coach Holidays: A Tour of Britain in the 1950s and 1960s. Vol. Scenes from the Past: 30 (Part Two). Foxline. ISBN 1-870119-53-3.
- Quick, Michael (2022) [2001]. Railway passenger stations in Great Britain: a chronology (PDF). version 5.04. Railway & Canal Historical Society. Archived from the original (PDF) on 25 November 2022.

Preceding station	Disused railways	Following station
Dalvey Farm Halt	Great North of Scotland Railway; Strathspey Railway	Grantown-on-Spey East
