= Grantown-on-Spey =

Town in Highland, Scotland

Coordinates: 57.329293°N 3.608772°W

Grantown-on-Spey: Scottish Gaelic: Baile nan Granndach; Grantown
- Town
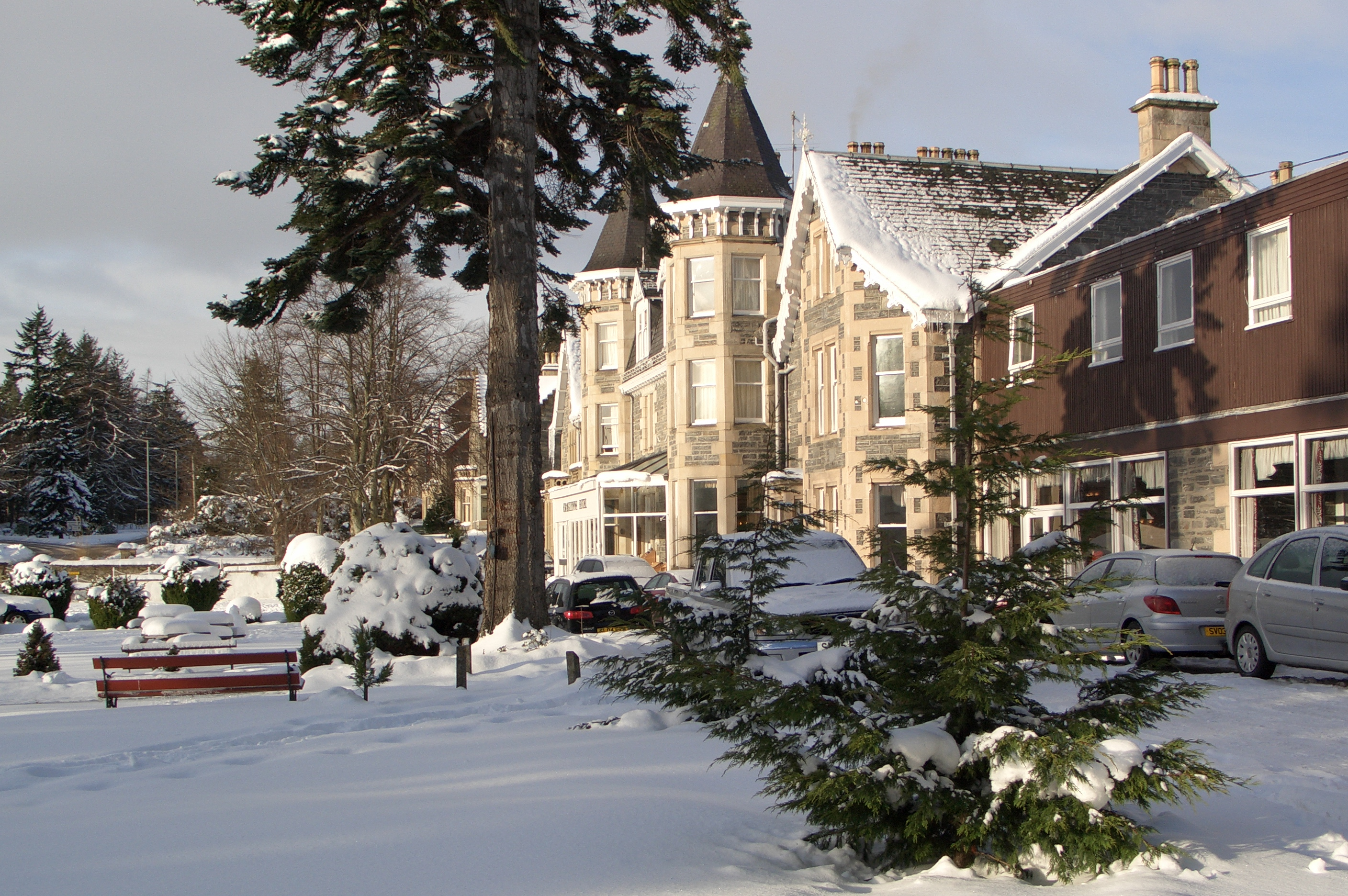
- A winter scene in Grantown-on-Spey

- Location within the Highland council area
- Area: 1.30 km^{2} (0.50 sq mi)
- Population: 2,328 (2022)
  - Density: 1,791/km^{2} (4,640/sq mi)
- Language: English
- OS grid reference: NJ031276
  - Edinburgh: 141 mi (227 km)
  - London: 544 mi (875 km)
- Community council: Grantown-on-Spey
- Council area: Highland
- Lieutenancy area: Inverness
- Country: Scotland
- Sovereign state: United Kingdom
- Post town: Grantown-On-Spey
- Postcode district: PH26
- Dialling code: 01479
- Police: Scotland
- Fire: Scottish
- Ambulance: Scottish
- UK Parliament: Moray West, Nairn and Strathspey
- Scottish Parliament: Inverness and Nairn
- Website: http://www.grantownonline.com

Grantown-on-Spey (Scottish Gaelic: Baile nan Granndach) is a town in the Highland Council Area in Scotland. Historically part of the county of Moray, it is located on a low plateau at Freuchie beside the River Spey at the northern edge of the Cairngorm mountains, about 20 miles (32 km) south-east of Inverness (35 miles or 56 km by road). It had a population of 2,328 in 2022.

The town was founded in 1765 as a planned settlement, and was originally called simply Grantown after Sir James Grant. The addition 'on Spey' was added by the burgh council in 1898. The town has several listed 18th and 19th century buildings, including several large hotels, and serves as a regional centre for tourism and services in the Strathspey region.

== History ==
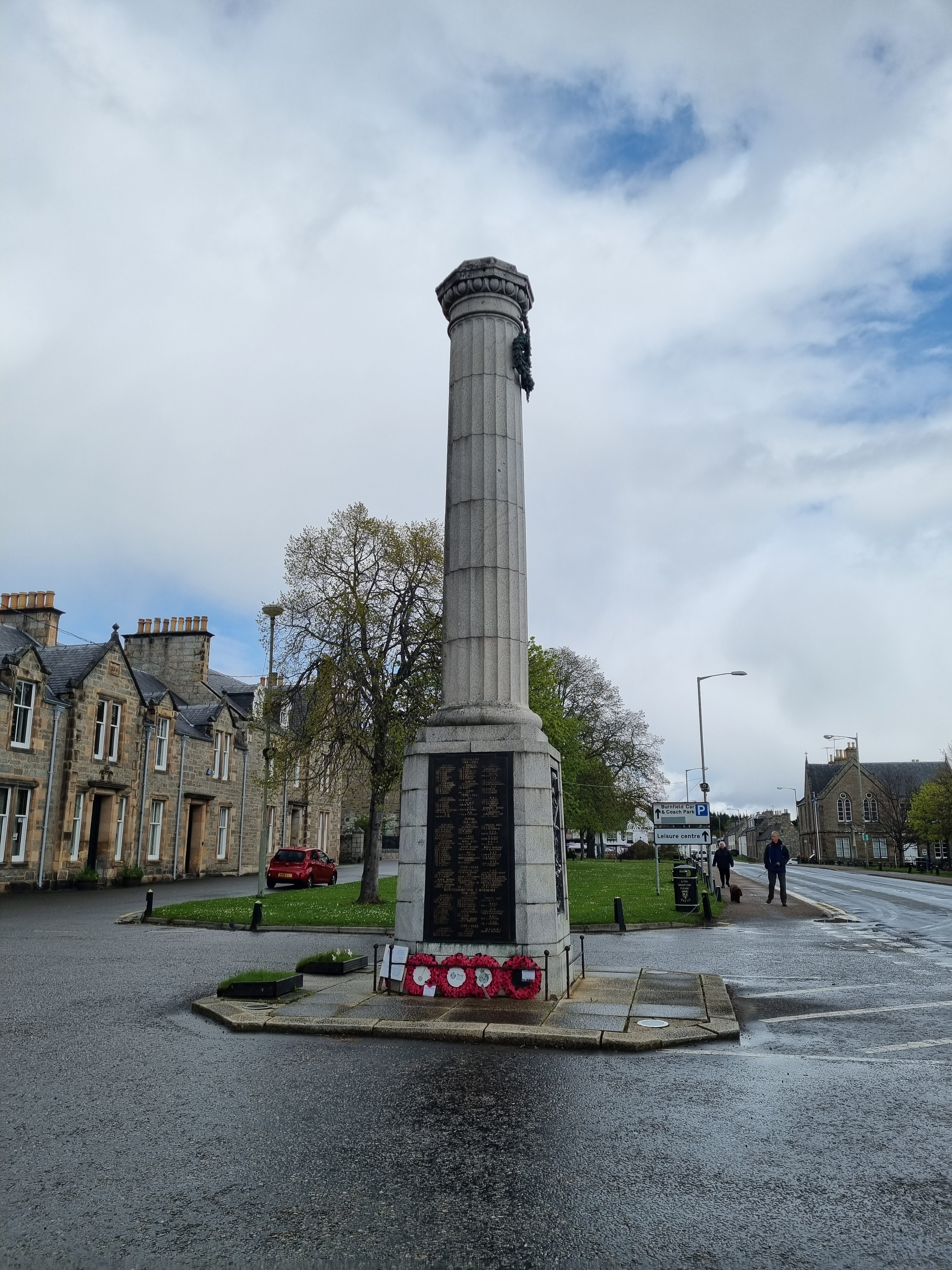
Grantown-on-Spey war memorial (erected 1921).

The burgh was founded in 1765 during the early stages of the Industrial Revolution, to encourage both agricultural marketing and handicrafts, as well as to increase local land values and reduce unemployment and emigration. This was part of a wider effort at social and economic improvements brought about by some progressive landlords following the decades of peace after the Jacobite rising of 1745.

Under the direction and funds of the landowner Sir James Grant, the site chosen for the town was to be a mile from Castle Grant and designed with space for a marketplace (known as the Square), with the High Street leading southwestwards. Large plots of land, 200 yards long, were set at right angles to the road. Old Grantown, an earlier small village near the castle, was demolished; and Kylintra Burn, a local stream, was diverted to become the local water source. The new town was advertised in newspapers and elsewhere as a site conveniently close to farms, forests and quarries, with persons and businesses invited to apply for feus and leases.

The official opening ceremony for the new town took place on 12 June 1766, with a procession and celebration party. By 1768 the town was considered established, and the first buildings had been constructed. By 1787 it was reported that there were over 300 inhabitants. To assist manufacturing, Grant paid for the construction of several small factories, linen manufacturing houses, and a bleachfield. During this period, new side roads, bridges, a town-house and jail were also built.

By 1800, the town had grown enough to satisfy the demand for a new church, and in 1803 Inverallan Church was built (originally named Grantown Church), itself replacing several previous churches, including one said to have dated back to medieval times. The church was rebuilt in the 1880s. By 1841 the town had a population of 1,000. By the 1860s, linen manufacture had declined and Grantown was primarily functioning as a market town for the surrounding agricultural district; then during the late Victorian era tourism began to develop. Queen Victoria and Prince Albert stayed for a night at the Grant Arms on 4 September 1860, as recorded in her diary; an extract from which is on display in the Grant Arms Hotel. In 1863, it was reported that Grantown had 21 merchants, two banks, three inns (the Grant Arms, the Black Bull and the New Inn) and several shops, along with the newly opened Strathspey Railway. In 1898 the town was granted Burgh status, and 'on Spey' was added to the name by the Burgh council.

In 1900, the High Street consisted of numerous commercial shops, including a ironmonger, stationer, newsagent, photographer, art studio, and several clothes shops, selling tartan, tweeds and knitwear. By 1902, tourism to the town and region had grown significantly, and the same factor was responsible for much of its development and growth in the 20th century and into the 21st.

The town war memorial to the First World War was erected in 1921, and takes the form of a granite column, designed by Alexander Marshall Mackenzie; the names of casualties from the Second World War were added in 1945.

By 1965, the town had a population of just under 1,600, and could accommodate 800 visitors in tourist accommodation.

In 2015 the town celebrated its 250th anniversary, with celebrations and a picnic involving foods reminiscent of those typically eaten in the 18th century.

In 2016, a charity fundraising event was held to honour the linen manufacturing history of the town.

== Economy ==
The primary industries in the area are agriculture, forestry, and tourist-related services, including guided wildlife watching tours operated from local hotels, notably the Grant Arms. Birdwatching, red squirrels and some other mammals, and sea life on the nearby coast are among the notable outdoor attractions, as well as the landscapes and geological & glacial history of the nearby Cairngorms and Moray coast.

Further afield, there are several whisky distilleries, including the new Cairn Distillery, by Gordon & MacPhail, in the south-west of the town at Craggan. Millers' of Speyside is a large abattoir on the edge of the town. There is a large smokehouse, currently operated by the Meatsnacks Group - prior to 2016 it was operated by Young's Seafood. The Cairngorms National Park Authority main office is located in the town.

=== Accommodation ===
There are various hotels and B&Bs, and self-catering accommodation. A large caravan park is managed by the Caravan and Motorhome Club.

== Landmarks ==
=== Museum and other notable buildings ===
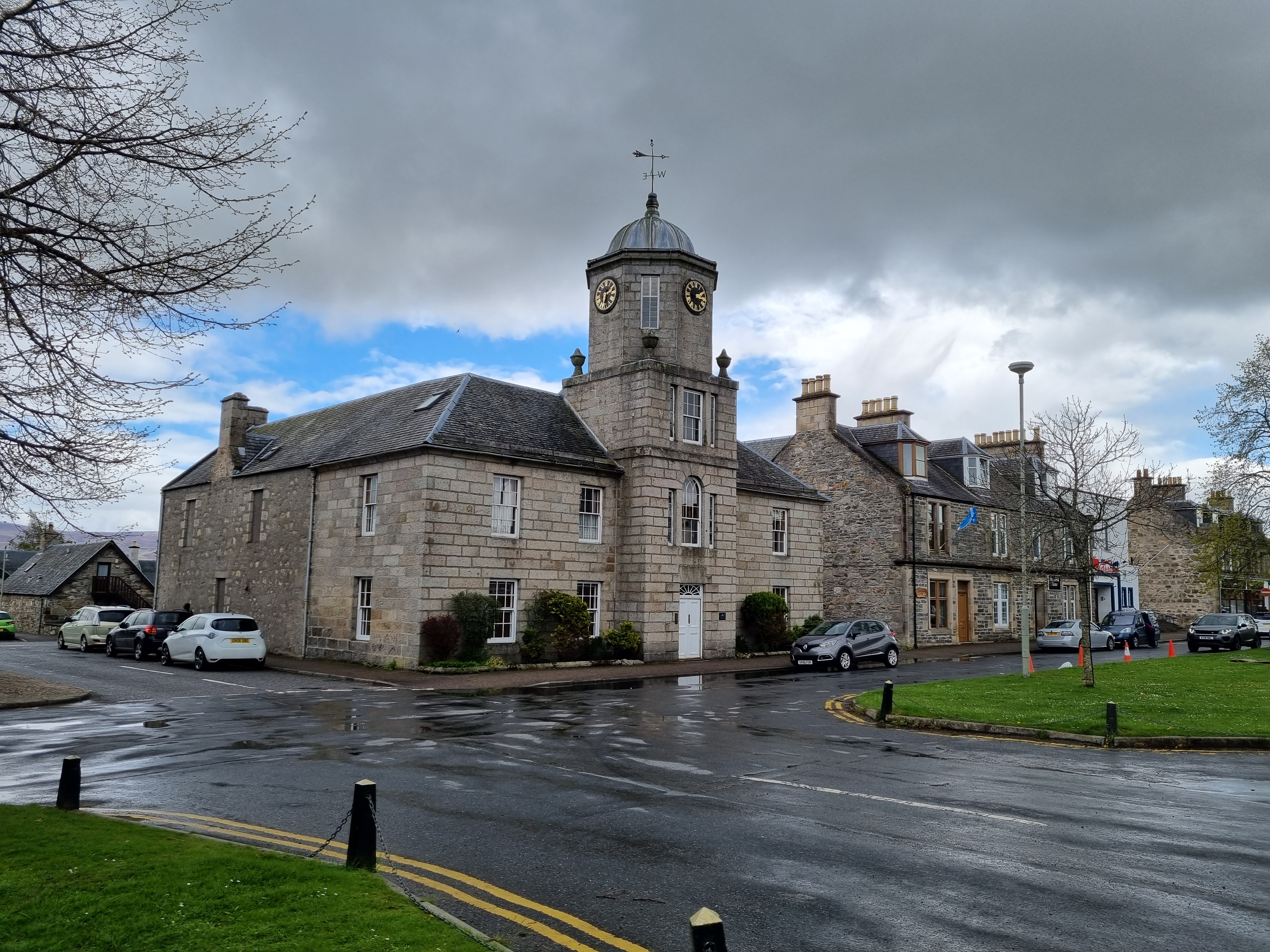
The Square, including the former Speyside Orphanage building and clocktower (1824).

Grantown Museum is located in Burnfield Avenue, near one of the town's car parks. In 1861, the Grantown Female School (Burnfield House) was built with funds from Captain John Grant, a factor of Strathspey. The school closed in 1890 when its pupils transferred to Grantown Grammar School and Burnfield House is now the home of the Museum. Adjacent to the museum is a Bell tower that holds the old town bell.

The Speyside Orphanage, also known as the Speyside Charity/Free School, was established in 1795, with funds from Lady Grant of Monymusk. It was originally built by local builder John Russell, but was damaged by fire and rebuilt in 1824, it closed in 1975. The building was converted to a heritage centre, and then later to private flats in 1986. The building is Category A listed and has a small clock tower, with an electric public turret clock from 1975; the earlier clock is in the town museum.

The High Street and Square contain several notable examples of Scottish baronial architecture and Georgian and Victorian-era buildings. At the corner of 1 High Street and 1 The Square is a Category B listed former bank, built by Matthews and Laurie. It was purpose-built in 1867, and originally housed the Caledonian Bank, then later the Bank of Scotland - which was the last remaining bank in Grantown, before finally closing in March 2021. A turreted building t nos. 3 & 5 High Street formerly contained the Town Post Office and the premises of A.C. Grant, formerly supplier of tweeds to HM King George V.

At 57 High Street is the Ben Mhor hotel, dating to the 1880s, formerly the Temperance Hotel. The former Strathspey Hotel, also called Dunbar's Hotel, is an early 19th century Category B listed building at 70/72 High Street, now converted into homes. Hastilow's Palace Hotel is another former hotel with multiple dormer windows (built in 1894 on the site of the previous Black Bull Inn) on the High Street, and is now a care home. The Grant Arms Hotel is a listed hotel on the Square which in its current form was primarily built in 1875, with substantial additions in the 1880s. The earlier hotel building was built in 1765, and on 4 September 1860 hosted Queen Victoria and Prince Albert. The Garth Hotel, on the Square, dates back to 1769, when it was built for James Grant, clerk and factor to Sir James Grant, as a private residence, and was later converted to a hotel. Craiglynne Hotel is a late 19th century hotel on the western edge of the town, on Woodlands Terrace.

The Royal British Legion building on the Square is an Art Deco building that was formerly a cinema from the 1920s to the early 1960s, before becoming a hall for the legion.

=== Community Facilities ===
Ian Charles Community Hospital is an NHS Scotland community hospital.

Anagach Woods is located on the eastern edge of the town, and has numerous waymarked trails. It is home to a secretive capercaillie population (a species of bird which has suffered drastic declines in numbers in recent decades and is extremely susceptible to human disturbance, meaning that local guides may nowadays decline to direct enthusiasts to try to find them, either in this area or the wider region.

=== Churches ===
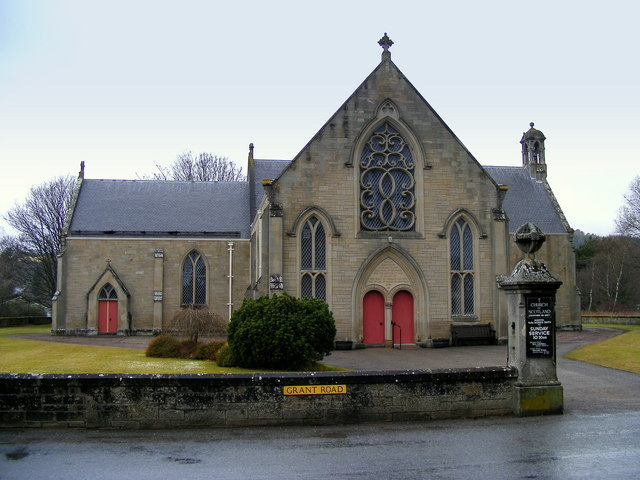
Inverallan Parish Church (built 1886)

There are a number of churches in the town - none of which has a burial ground.

Inverallan Parish Church (Church of Scotland) is located on Mossie Road. The current Inverallan Church was rebuilt on the site of several earlier churches to a design by the architect Alexander Smith Cullen in 1886. The rebuilding was funded by Caroline Stuart, Countess of Seafield as a memorial to the death of her husband and son. The church is in Victorian Gothic in style and set out in a cruciform shape. The church incorporates details from the previous churches on the site, including carvings and woodwork from the 17th century.

The Baptist church is at the junction of High Street and Chapel Road. A church in the High Street (opposite Dunstaffnage Brae) is shared by two congregations: Scottish Episcopalian (St Columba), and Roman Catholic (St Anne), who advertise the location as Woodlands Crescent. (Postcode PH26 3EN).

=== Cemeteries ===
There are two local cemeteries, both of which are maintained by the Highland Council:

- Inverallan, the original burial ground, is now only available for use by holders of existing vacant lairs. Most older inscriptions have been transcribed and published in book form; memorials with no events after 1855 are mostly unrecorded in published form. It is between the River Spey and Inverallan House at O.S. grid reference NJ 026 260, and is beside the car park at the end of a road leading from the B9102 road. Apart from the baptism font beside the entrance gate the original Inverallan parish church no longer remains. Official records for this burial ground were not started until the 1900s, when the gravedigger retired and it was realised that he was then the only source of information regarding burials not indicated on the memorials; the current burial register was founded upon the information supplied by him. Therefore, only burials recorded since that time have details supplied contemporaneously by relatives or undertakers.
- Grantown Cemetery (also known as the New Cemetery) has been in use since the early 20th century. It is located between the B9102 and the A95 roads south of Grantown at O.S. grid reference NJ 027 267. The main entrance and car parking is on the B9102 with an alternative access to the lower end from the A95 Grantown bypass.

== Transport ==
=== Road ===
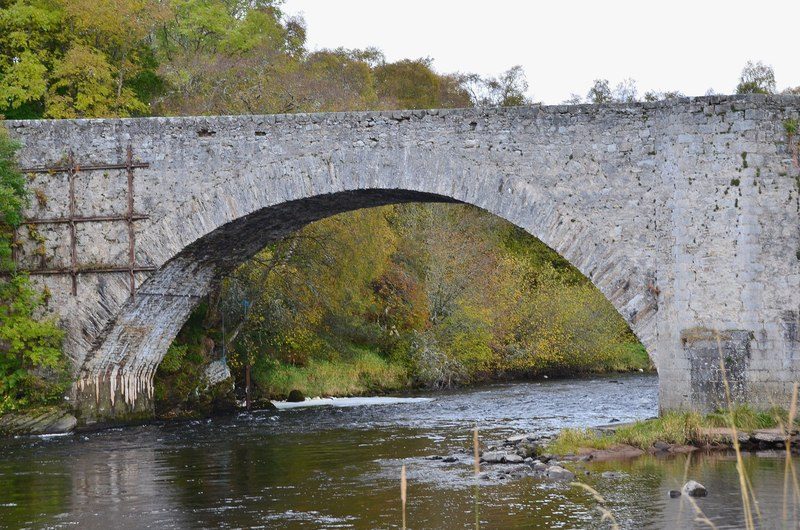
The Old Spey Bridge (dating from 1754) is closed to motor traffic and used by pedestrians and cyclists.

The town was built on an easily accessible site along the existing military road from Boat of Garten to Inverness and Fort George (built between 1728 and 1730). These are now respectively the A95, the B9102 (the High Street and Square), and the A939 to the north.

The Old Spey Bridge lies on the south-eastern edge of Grantown, at the locality of Speybridge. It dates from 1754, and was built as part of the military road from Grantown eastwards to Corgaff by the 33rd Regiment of Foot under Lord Charles Hay. The bridge has three arches. It was damaged by large floods in 1829, leading to the smallest arch being rebuilt. By 1931, the old bridge was considered insufficient, and a modern concrete bridge replaced it, upstream to the west. The new bridge was built by engineers Blyth & Blyth, and consists of a single segmental concrete arch of 240 ft. The old bridge is now used only by pedestrians and cyclists.

=== Rail ===
There are now no rail services to Grantown. The closest main line stations are Aviemore and Carrbridge, from which trains travel north and south between Inverness and the Central Belt on the Highland Main Line. There is also a station at Forres, 22 miles to the north, from which trains run between Inverness and Aberdeen.

Grantown-on-Spey was connected by rail until the 1960s. The Inverness and Perth Junction Railway was completed in 1863, and increased the number of tourists and visitors to town. There were two stations, Grantown-on-Spey East and Grantown-on-Spey West. Grantown West station was rebuilt in 1887 to improve facilities for passengers. By October 1965, both stations were closed to passengers, and in 1968 freight services ended.

The Strathspey Railway is a heritage railway which currently runs between Aviemore and Broomhill (near Nethy Bridge), via Boat of Garten. The railway has been progressively reopening the line, and work is ongoing to extend the railway again to Grantown. This included the placement of a new bridge over the River Dulnain.

=== Buses ===
There are several local bus services, mainly concentrating on the route to and from Aviemore, but also serving surrounding places. Some services operate only on schooldays.

Occasional buses go to the Cairngorm Mountain Railway.

Various long distance bus services are available in Aviemore, Elgin and Keith. Current information for bus services of most of the operators is on the websites of Moray Council and the Stagecoach group.

== Education ==
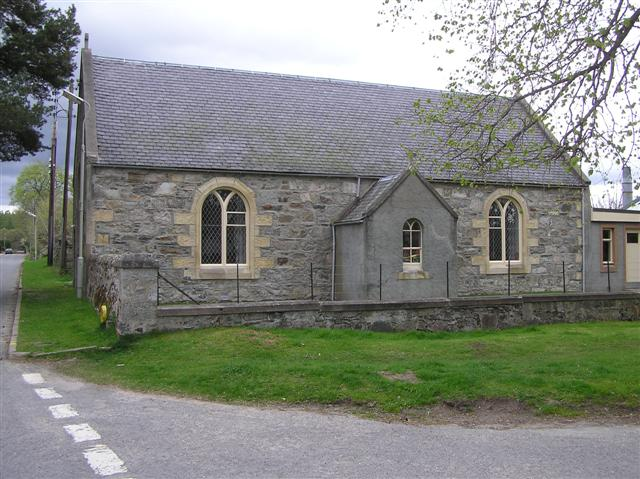
Grantown Primary School on Grant Road.

The first school in Grantown was planned from 1765 (on a middle lot to the south side of the Square), with two classrooms, but was not built until 1767 owing to insufficient children of school age in the town. The school was extended in 1879, and continued to expand, the senior years eventually becoming the current Grantown Grammar School. In 1975 moved to a new large campus building at its present location. It provides education for children and young people between the ages of 11 and 18 years. Grantown Primary School remains on the site of the earlier school, in a newer building constructed following the 1872 Education Act. The Speyside Charity/Free School and the Grantown Female School were former schools of the town; their extant buildings have been repurposed.

== Sport ==
Grantown-on-Spey golf course was created in 1890, with nine holes, on a partly woodland site, by golfer A.C. Brown. In 1911 it was extended to 18 holes, to a design by Open champion Willie Park Jr., and later altered by James Braid, US Open Champion. A prominent club member was Bobby Cruickshank, who won more than 20 tournaments in the US. The pavilion was built in the 1890s and refurnished in 1999.

The Craig MacLean Leisure Centre has a swimming pool and gym.

== Twin town ==
Grantown-on-Spey is twinned with:

- Notre-Dame-de-Monts, Vendée, France.

== Notable people ==
- Aung San Suu Kyi, Burmese politician
- Bobby Cruickshank, Golfer
- John Kerr, Baron Kerr of Kinlochard, diplomat
- Isabella Leitch, the nutritionist, was born here in 1890
- Craig MacLean, Track Cyclist
- Nikolai Orlov, Russian-born pianist
- James Ogilvie-Grant, 11th Earl of Seafield, Deputy Lieutenant for the County of Elgin
- W. N. T. Beckett, Captain, Royal Navy
- Robert Grant, Astronomer
- John Shaw Dawson, Chief Justice of the Kansas Supreme Court
