= Craigellachie, Moray =

Coordinates: 57.490°N 3.187°W

Craigellachie: Scottish Gaelic: Creag Eileachaidh
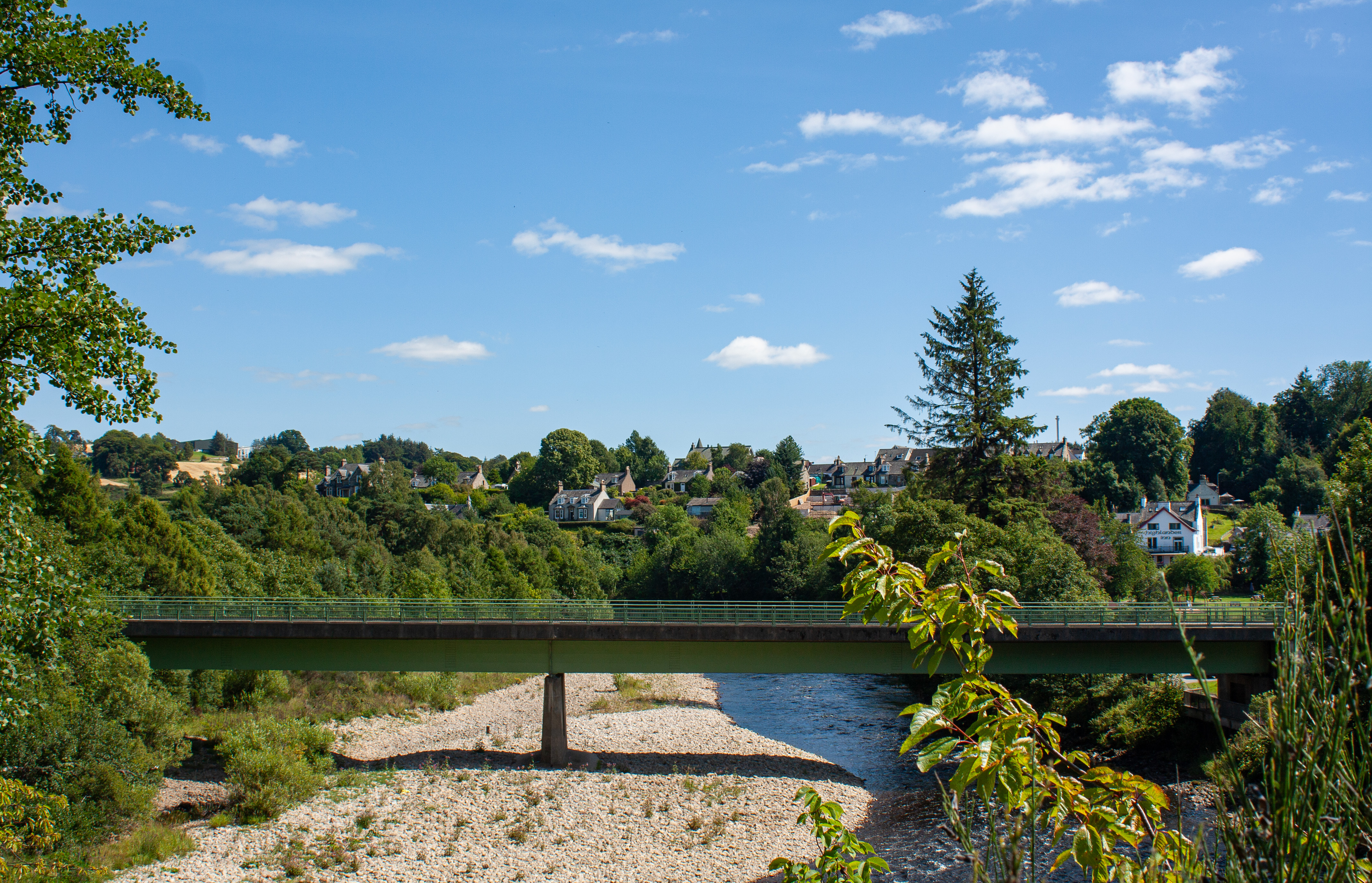
- Craigellachie as seen from Craigellachie Bridge

- Location within Moray
- OS grid reference: NJ293452
- Council area: Moray
- Lieutenancy area: Banffshire
- Country: Scotland
- Sovereign state: United Kingdom
- Post town: ABERLOUR
- Postcode district: AB38
- Police: Scotland
- Fire: Scottish
- Ambulance: Scottish
- UK Parliament: Moray West, Nairn and Strathspey
- Scottish Parliament: Moray

Craigellachie (/kreɪɡˈɛləxi/; Scottish Gaelic: Creag Eileachaidh) is a small village in Moray, Scotland, at the confluence of the River Spey and River Fiddich (whose valley or glen gives its name to the famous Scotch whisky Glenfiddich), in walking distance of the town of Aberlour.

The name means "rocky hill" and was first applied to the cliff on which much of the village is sited, above the River Spey. Craigellachie dates back to at least 1750, when there was a ferry across the Spey where today's village now stands. It also stands at the intersection of the A95 from Keith to Aberlour and the A941 from Rothes to Dufftown.

Craigellachie has two malt whisky distilleries (Craigellachie and The Macallan) and is home to the Speyside Cooperage.

Craigellachie Bridge over the River Spey was built by Thomas Telford between 1812 and 1815. A plaque on one of the castellated towers guarding the entrance to the bridge records that the metalwork was cast in Wales: another that the bridge was restored to this, something like its original condition, in 1964. The bridge is a remarkable piece of engineering, and can be viewed from above or below.

Craigellachie railway station, closed in 1968, provided a link between the Strathspey Railway and the Morayshire Railway (later the Great North of Scotland Railway).

Craigellachie is an important stopping off point on the Speyside Way, a long distance path from Buckie in the north to Aviemore in the south.

== Prehistory and archaeology ==
In advance of the creation of the new distillery and visitor experience at the Macallan distillery, archaeological excavations were undertaken by AOC Archaeology in 2014. The archaeologists found that people had been living and working in the area for thousands of years. There found evidence of people working in the area in the Middle Bronze Age (radiocarbon dates of 1681–1503 cal BC); had built a small settlement in the Late Bronze Age (radiocarbon dates of between 1050 and 800 BC); then a single ring-ditch roundhouse in the Middle Iron Age (radiocarbon dates of 171 BC - AD 51); another small settlement between the ninth to twelfth centuries AD with two post-ring roundhouses; and a 19th century quarry. There was also some evidence (two stone tools) of people being in the area during the Mesolithic period.

== Places in Craigellachie ==
Notable places in Craigellachie include the Fiddichside Inn, Highlander Inn, and the Craigellachie Hotel. It is home to the Craigellachie and Macallan distilleries. There is a petrol station in the top half of the village, with a car wash and an electric vehicle charger. Nearby sights include Balvenie Castle and Glenfiddich distillery in Dufftown, Aberlour distillery in Aberlour, and The Glenlivet distillery.

Craigellachie Golf Club was first recorded in 1898 and continued until the 1950s, after which the location was converted to farmland.

== Name connection ==
Craigellachie, British Columbia, is named after the Scottish village and is the place where the last spike of the Canadian Pacific Railway was driven in November 1885.
