= Nethy Bridge railway station =

Disused railway station in Nethy Bridge, Highland

Nethy Bridge
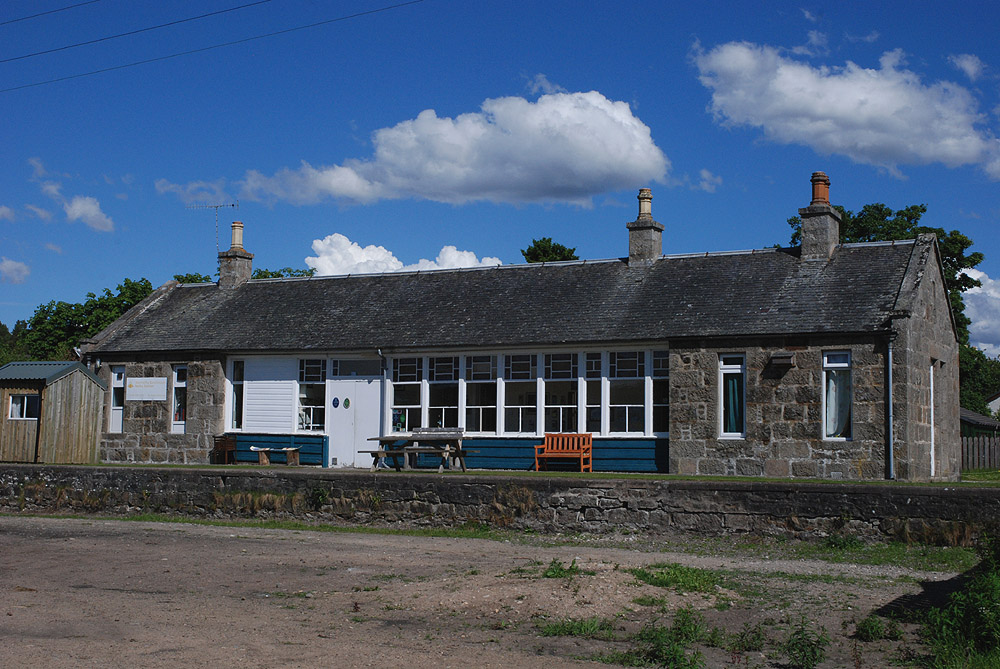
- The station building in 2009

General information
- Location: Nethy Bridge, Highland; Scotland
- Coordinates: 57.266°N 3.6597°W
- Grid reference: NJ000207
- Platforms: 1

Other information
- Status: Disused

History
- Original company: Strathspey Railway
- Pre-grouping: Great North of Scotland Railway
- Post-grouping: LNER

Key dates
- 1 July 1863: Opened as Abernethy
- 1 November 1871: Renamed Nethy Bridge
- 18 October 1965: Closed
Location

Nethy Bridge railway station served the village of Nethy Bridge, Highland, Scotland from 1863 to 1965 on the Strathspey Railway.

== History ==
The station opened on 1 July 1863 as Abernethy by the Strathspey Railway. Its name was changed to Nethy Bridge to avoid confusion with Abernethy near Perth. This meant the village was renamed, though the name Abernethy is still in frequent use for the area.

The station closed to both passengers and goods traffic on 18 October 1965.

Preceding station	Disused railways	Following station
Ballifurth Farm Halt; Line and station closed	Strathspey Railway	Boat of Garten; Line closed, station open
