= Carron Bridge (River Spey) =

Bridge in Moray, Scotland

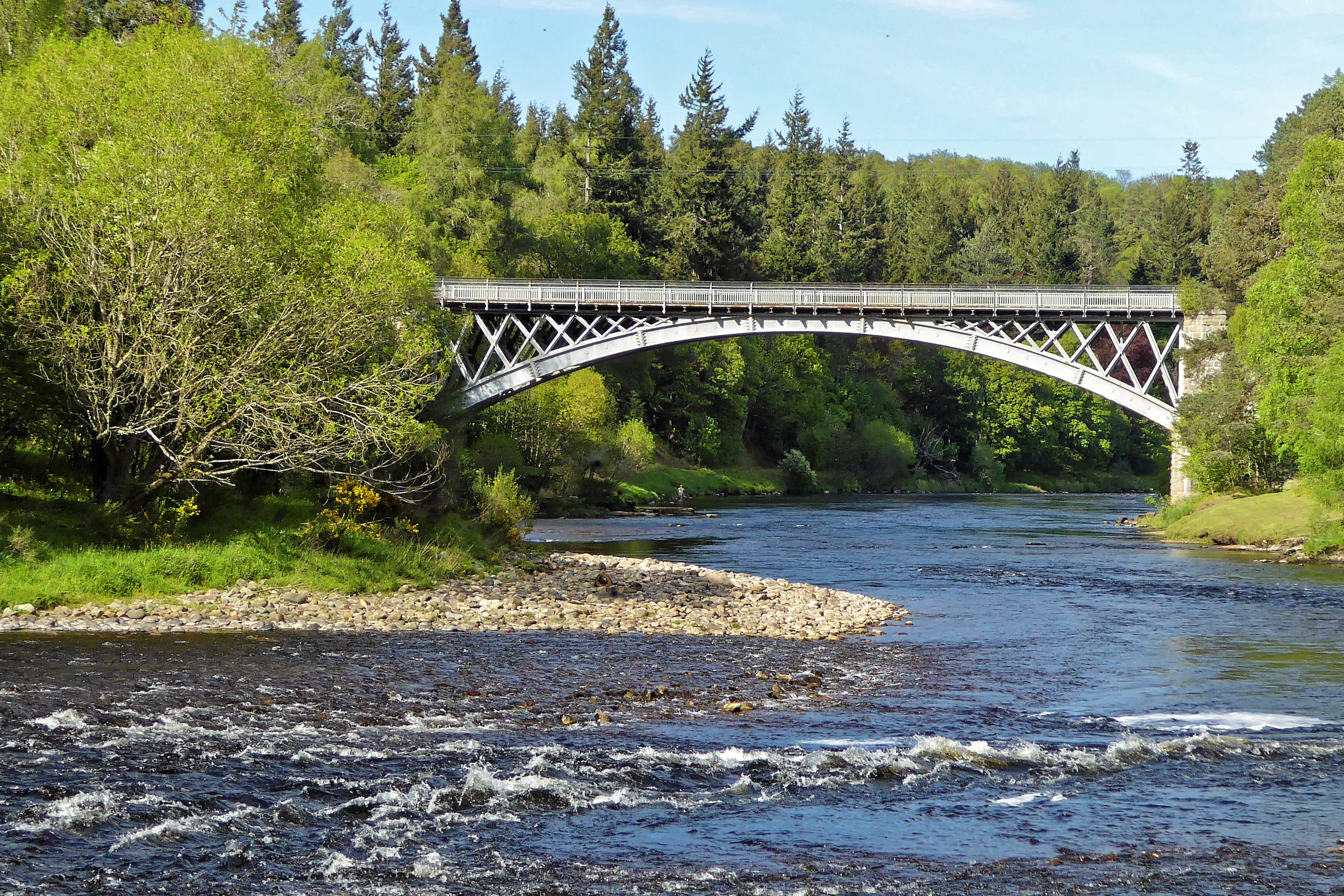
- The Carron Bridge arching over the Spey
- Coordinates: 57°27′15″N 3°17′38″W
- Carries: Railway and road (railway now closed)
- Crosses: River Spey

Characteristics
- Material: Cast iron
- Longest span: 45.7 metres (150 ft)

History
- Designer: Alexander Gibb
- Opened: 1863

Listed Building – Category A
- Official name: Carron Bridge Over River Spey
- Designated: 9 November 1987
- Reference no.: LB8495

Location
- Interactive map of Carron Bridge

The Carron Bridge is a bridge at Carron in Moray, Scotland, which crosses the River Spey between the parishes of Knockando and Aberlour. It was built for the Strathspey Railway in 1863, to a design by Alexander Gibb, an engineer for the Great North of Scotland Railway, and fabricated by the iron founders William McKinnon and Co. It originally carried both the railway and a roadway, but the railway has now closed.

== Description ==
Carron Bridge is located near the town of Carron, in Moray, Scotland. The main span, a 45.7-metre-wide (150 ft) segmental arch, is supported by three cast iron ribs, each cast in seven parts and bolted together, with masonry flood arches on each bank, which have spans of 7.6 metres (25 ft). The spandrels linking the main arch to the carriageways are composed of delicate cast iron lattice work. At either end are abutment piers of rustic ashlar, protected by triangular cutwaters.

== History ==
The bridge was constructed between 1862 and 1863 by engineer Alexander Gibb of the Great North of Scotland Railway, and ironfounders William McKinnon and Co. It was the last cast iron railway bridge to be built in Scotland and was also the last to be used by railway traffic. When the Strathspey line closed in 1968, the railway tracks adjoining the road were removed. It was designated a Category A listed building in 1987. Proposals were put forward in 1993 to replace the bridge with a steel structure. Historic Scotland successfully objected to these, and the original structure was preserved and renovated to include the current single-lane road with adjoining footpath.

== See also ==
- List of bridges in Scotland
