= List of listed buildings in Dron, Perth and Kinross =

This is a list of listed buildings in the parish of Dron in Perth and Kinross, Scotland.

== List ==
Name	Location	Date Listed	Grid Ref. (Note: Sometimes known as OSGB36, the grid reference (where provided) is based on the British national grid reference system used by the Ordnance Survey. • "Guide to National Grid". Ordnance Survey. • "Get-a-map". Ordnance Survey.)	Geo-coordinates	Notes	LB Number (Note: Historic Environment Scotland assign a unique alphanumeric identifier to each designated site in Scotland, for listed buildings this always begins with "LB", for example "LB12345".)	Image
Balmanno Castle Including Garden House Outbuilding And Gatehouse				56°19′29″N 3°23′11″W	Category A	5422	Upload Photo
Kilnockie Railway Viaduct				56°19′10″N 3°22′08″W	Category B	5433	Upload Photo
Glenfarg Railway Viaduct Over River Farg				56°18′11″N 3°22′01″W	Category B	5434	Upload Photo
Glenfarg House, Stable Block				56°19′20″N 3°21′19″W	Category B	6383	Upload Photo
Glenearn House				56°19′58″N 3°26′30″W	Category B	5425	Upload Photo
Dron Parish Church				56°19′40″N 3°23′26″W	Category B	5448	Upload another image See more images
Balmanno Castle Steading				56°19′28″N 3°23′04″W	Category B	5423	Upload Photo
Glenearn Lodge				56°20′05″N 3°26′01″W	Category B	5424	Upload Photo
Cottage (Empty In 1967) The Bein Inn				56°18′10″N 3°21′30″W	Category B	77	Upload Photo
East Dron House				56°19′36″N 3°23′32″W	Category C(S)	5421	Upload Photo
Ecclesmagirdle, Loupin' On Stane				56°19′53″N 3°26′42″W	Category B	5429	Upload Photo
Dron Churchyard				56°19′39″N 3°23′26″W	Category B	5419	Upload Photo
Ecclesmagirdle, Doocot				56°19′53″N 3°26′41″W	Category A	5430	Upload Photo
Ecclesmagirdle, Chapel				56°19′52″N 3°26′42″W	Category B	5431	Upload Photo
Glenfarg House, Gatelodge				56°19′24″N 3°21′17″W	Category B	6384	Upload Photo
Ecclesmagirdle (Or Ecclesiamagirdle) House				56°19′53″N 3°26′42″W	Category A	5427	Upload Photo
Manse Of Dron (Now Mrs. Mclean)				56°19′40″N 3°23′29″W	Category C(S)	5420	Upload Photo
Glenearn House Sundial				56°20′01″N 3°26′35″W	Category B	5426	Upload Photo
Ecclesmagirdle, Gateway				56°19′53″N 3°26′42″W	Category B	5428	Upload Photo
Steading, The Bein Inn				56°18′10″N 3°21′30″W	Category C(S)	5435	Upload Photo
Pottiehill Farmhouse				56°18′35″N 3°21′38″W	Category B	5436	Upload Photo
Glenearn Farmhouse				56°19′48″N 3°26′38″W	Category C(S)	5432	Upload Photo
Glenfarg House				56°19′20″N 3°21′23″W	Category B	5437	Upload another image

== Key ==
The scheme for classifying buildings in Scotland is:

- Category A: "buildings of national or international importance, either architectural or historic; or fine, little-altered examples of some particular period, style or building type."
- Category B: "buildings of regional or more than local importance; or major examples of some particular period, style or building type, which may have been altered."
- Category C: "buildings of local importance; lesser examples of any period, style, or building type, as originally constructed or moderately altered; and simple traditional buildings which group well with other listed buildings."

In March 2016 there were 47,288 listed buildings in Scotland. Of these, 8% were Category A, and 50% were Category B, with the remaining 42% being Category C.
