= George Auchinleck =

George Auchinleck may refer to:

- George Auchinleck, Lord Balmanno (c. 1560–c. 1640), Scottish politician and judge
- George Auchinleck of Balmanno (died 1596), Scottish courtier
