= List of civil parishes of Scotland =

Map of civil parishes in Scotland

This is a list of the 871 civil parishes in Scotland.

== Context ==
From 1845 to 1930, parishes formed part of the local government system of Scotland: having parochial boards from 1845 to 1894, and parish councils from 1894 until 1930.

The parishes, which had their origins in the ecclesiastical parishes of the Church of Scotland, often overlapped county boundaries, largely because they reflected earlier territorial divisions.

In the early 1860s, many parishes which were physically detached from their county were re-allocated to the county by which they were surrounded; some border parishes were transferred to neighbouring counties. This affects the indexing of such things as birth, marriage, and death registrations and other records indexed by county. In 1891, there were further substantial changes to the areas of many parishes, as the Hay Shennan boundary commission appointed under the Local Government (Scotland) Act 1889 eliminated many anomalies, and assigned divided parishes to a single county.

Parishes have had no direct administrative function since 1930. In that year, all parishes and parts of parishes outside burghs (technically known as landward), were grouped into districts with elected district councils. These council districts were abolished in 1975, and the new local council authorities established in that year often cut across parish boundaries. In 1996, there was a further reorganisation of Scottish local government, and a number of civil parishes lie in two or more council areas. The counties and county place-names are retained for Land Registrations, Lieutenancy areas, Chambers of Commerce, and various community organizations, although their administrations were taken over by Regional Councils.

Civil parishes are still used for some statistical purposes, and separate census figures are published for them. As their areas have been largely unchanged since the 19th century, this allows for comparison of population figures over an extended period of time.

There have been many variations in the spelling of some parish names over the historical period. In this list the names as used in the reports of the General Register Office for Scotland for the 2002 census are used.

== List ==
Civil Parish	Created	County/ies	Council Area (modern)	Former/alt names	Area (hect)	Pop'n (2011)
Civil Parish	Created	County/ies	Council Area (modern)	Former/alt names	(1930 boundaries)	
Abbey St Bathans	Medieval	Berwickshire	Scottish Borders		3,019	106
Abdie	Medieval	Fife	Fife	Lindores	728	421
Abercorn	Medieval	Linlithgowshire	West Lothian / Falkirk		1,317	458
Aberdalgie	Medieval	Perthshire	Perth and Kinross		1,155	402
Aberdeen	----	Ab'shire (-1891), Ab City (1891-)	Aberdeen City		4,519	160,738
Aberdour	Medieval	Aberdeenshire	Aberdeenshire		6,920	763
Aberdour	Medieval	Fife	Fife		3,566	1,972
Aberfoyle	Medieval	Perthshire	Stirling		4,986	1,065
Aberlady	Medieval	Haddingtonshire	East Lothian		1,885	1,514
Aberlemno	Medieval	Forfarshire	Angus		4,705	544
Aberlour	Medieval	Banffshire	Moray	Skirdustan	4,026	2,204
Abernethy	Medieval	Fife/Perth (1891-), Perth (1891-)	Perth & Kinross / Fife		3,418	1,826
Abernethy & Kincardine	1593	Inverness-shire	Highland		34,992	1,302
Abernyte	Medieval	Perthshire	Perth and Kinross		1,906	244
Aboyne & Glentanar	1600	Aberdeenshire	Aberdeenshire		12,172	2,961
Airlie	Medieval	Forfarshire	Angus		4,247	506
Airth	Medieval	Stirlingshire	Falkirk		2,914	2,438
Alford	Medieval	Aberdeenshire	Aberdeenshire		3,736	2,860
Alloa	c1560	Clackmannanshire	Clackmannanshire	Alloway	5,489	30,443
Alness	Medieval	Ross (-1889), Ross & Cromarty (1889-)	Highland		534	3,093
Alva	Medieval	Stirling (1891-) / Clack (-1891)	Clackmannanshire		248	7,577
Alvah	Medieval	Banffshire	Aberdeenshire		6,011	665
Alves	Medieval	Morayshire	Moray		2,158	505
Alvie	Medieval	Inverness-shire	Highland		29,525	564
Alyth	Medieval	Forfar / Perth	Perth and Kinross		7,874	3,054
Ancrum	Medieval	Roxburghshire	Scottish Borders		4,916	824
Annan	Medieval	Dumfriesshire	Dumfries & Galloway		5,762	10,503
Anstruther Easter	1641	Fife	Fife		10	315
Anstruther Wester	Medieval	Fife	Fife		41	741
Anwoth	Medieval	Kirkcudbrightshire	Dumfries & Galloway		3,125	737
Applecross	Medieval	Ross & Cromarty	Highland	Comaraich. Absorbed into Lochcarron at the Reformation and re-created in 1726?	47,522	576
Applegarth	Medieval	Dumfriesshire	Dumfries & Galloway		6,179	498
Arbirlot	Medieval	Forfarshire	Angus		2,325	1,082
Arbroath and St Vigeans	1895	Forfarshire	Angus		5,664	25,026
Arbuthnott	Medieval	Kincardineshire	Aberdeenshire		4,233	427
Ardchattan & Muckairn	1618	Argyllshire	Arg & But / Highland		35,378	2,536
Ardclach	Medieval	Nairnshire	Highland		25,402	483
Ardersier	Medieval	Inverness-shire	Highland		1,463	1,167
Ardgour	1895	Argyllshire	Highland		48,545	441
Ardnamurchan	Medieval	Argyll / Inverness	Highland		32,156	1,144
Ardoch	1855	Perthshire	Perth and Kinross		10,690	1,156
Ardrossan	Medieval	Ayrshire	North Ayrshire		1,892	21,833
Arisaig and Moidart	1895	Argyllshire	Highland		55,629	894
Arngask	Medieval	Fife / Kinr / Perth	Perth and Kinross		2,004	931
Arrochar	1658	Dunbartonshire	Argyll and Bute		11,391	728
Ashkirk	Medieval	Roxburgh / Selkirk	Scottish Borders		3,786	246
Assynt	Medieval	Sutherland	Highland		47,932	1,021
Athelstaneford	Medieval	Haddingtonshire	East Lothian		2,162	720
Auchindoir and Kearn	1808	Aberdeenshire	Aberdeenshire		8,576	545
Auchinleck	Medieval	Ayrshire	East Ayrshire		6,482	5,852
Auchterarder	Medieval	Perthshire	Perth and Kinross		4,814	4,747
Auchterderran	Medieval	Fife	Fife		2,944	11,732
Auchtergaven	Medieval	Perthshire	Perth and Kinross		8,528	2,748
Auchterhouse	Medieval	Forfarshire	Angus		2,224	700
Auchterless	Medieval	Aberdeenshire	Aberdeenshire		6,789	819
Auchtermuchty	Medieval	Fife	Fife		2,285	2,603
Auchtertool	Medieval	Fife	Fife		19	419
Auldearn	Medieval	Nairnshire	Highland		6,000	1,350
Avoch	Medieval	Ross & Cromarty	Highland		2,466	1,408
Avondale	Medieval	Lanarkshire	South Lanarkshire	Strathavon	17,075	8,787
Ayr	Medieval	Ayrshire	South Ayrshire		4,860	47,120
Ayton	Medieval	Berwickshire	Scottish Borders		2,088	1,786
Baldernock	Medieval	Stirlingshire	East Dunbartonshire		2,875	1,482
Balfron	Medieval	Stirlingshire	Stirling		4,283	2,156
Ballantrae	Medieval	Ayrshire	Dum & Gal / S Ayr	Kirkcudbright Innertig (-1604)	9,574	636
Ballingry	Medieval	Fife / Kinross	Fife		1,178	7,452
Balmaclellan	Medieval	Kirkcudbrightshire	Dumfries & Galloway		12,948	476
Balmaghie	Medieval	Kirkcudbrightshire	Dumfries & Galloway	Kirkandrews	6,399	567
Balmerino	Medieval	Fife	Fife	Coultra	1,415	946
Balquhidder	Medieval	Perthshire	Stirling		21,145	663
Banchory-Devenick	Medieval	Kincardineshire	Aberdeenshire		3,364	8,823
Banchory-Ternan	Medieval	Aberdn / Kincard	Aberdeenshire		8,524	8,915
Banff	Medieval	Banffshire	Aberdeenshire		2,861	4,420
Barr	1653	Ayrshire	South Ayrshire		1,418	240
Barra	Med/1733	Inverness-shire	Na h-Eileanan Siar	Kilbarr	9,199	1,264
Barry	Medieval	Forfarshire	Angus	Fethmures or Fothmures	2,415	8,276
Barvas	Medieval	Ross & Cromarty	Na h-Eileanan Siar	An Cladach	41,089	3,244
Bathgate	Medieval	Linlithgowshire	West Lothian		4,953	32,691
Beath	Medieval	Fife	Fife		3,533	17,351
Bedrule	Medieval	Roxburghshire	Scottish Borders		1,626	183
Beith	Medieval	Ayr / Renfrew	North Ayrshire		5,025	7,369
Belhelvie	Medieval	Aberdeenshire	Aberdeenshire		5,080	5,082
Bellie	Medieval	Banff / Moray	Moray		6,513	2,498
Bendochy	Medieval	Perthshire	Perth and Kinross		797	67
Benholm	Medieval	Kincardineshire	Aberdeenshire		1,826	877
Bervie	1618	Kincardineshire	Aberdeenshire	Inverbervie	1,086	3,087
Biggar	Medieval	Lanarkshire	South Lanarkshire		3,198	2,722
Birnie	Medieval	Morayshire	Moray		2,375	351
Birsay and Harray	C16th	Orkney	Orkney		10,594	1,389
Birse	Medieval	Aberdeenshire	Aberdeenshire		14,682	899
Blackford	Medieval	Perthshire	Perth and Kinross	Strageath (-1617)	9,315	1,628
Blair Atholl	Medieval	Perthshire	Perth and Kinross		71,720	926
Blairgowrie	Medieval	Perthshire	Perth and Kinross		6,824	6,470
Blantyre	Medieval	Lanarkshire	South Lanarkshire		1,433	18,296
Boharm	Medieval	Banff / Moray	Moray	Arndilly	7,001	534
Boleskine and Abertarff	1614	Inverness-shire	Highland		45,704	1,384
Bolton	Medieval	Haddingtonshire	East Lothian		465	110
Bo'ness and Carriden	1895	Linlithgowshire	Falkirk		2,650	15,540
Bonhill	Medieval	Dunbartonshire	Arg & But / W Dunb	Buchnull	2,017	20,684
Borgue	Medieval	Kirkcudbrightshire	Dumfries & Galloway		5,374	495
Borthwick	Medieval	Midlothian	Midlothian	Lochorworth or Loquhariot	2,916	2,841
Bothwell	Medieval	Lanarkshire	N Lanark / S Lanark		5,319	80,437
Botriphnie	Medieval	Banffshire	Moray		4,747	344
Bourtie	Medieval	Aberdeenshire	Aberdeenshire		2,802	430
Bowden	Medieval	Roxburghshire	Scottish Borders		2,083	579
Bower	Medieval	Caithness	Highland		10,032	633
Boyndie	Medieval	Banffshire	Aberdeenshire	Inverboyndie	3,754	1,604
Bracadale	Medieval	Inverness-shire	Highland		37,999	799
Brechin	Medieval	Forfarshire	Angus		3,988	8,075
Bressay	Medieval	Zetland	Shetland		3,086	368
Broughton, Glenholm & Kilbucho	1794	Peeblesshire	Scottish Borders		13,636	648
Buchanan	Medieval	Stirlingshire	Stirling	Inchcailloch/Inchcailleach	24,096	550
Buittle	Medieval	Kirkcudbrightshire	Dumfries & Galloway		5,522	582
Bunkle and Preston	1621	Berwickshire	Scottish Borders		3,395	344
Burntisland	Medieval	Fife	Fife	Kinghorn Wester	911	6,383
Cabrach	Medieval	Aberdeen / Banff	Moray	Cloveth	13,016	69
Cadder	Medieval	Lanarkshire	E Dun / Glas / N Lan		5,756	52,967
Caddonfoot	1898	Selkirkshire	Scottish Borders		8,317	912
Caerlaverock	Medieval	Dumfriesshire	Dumfries & Galloway	Kirkblane/Kilblain	3,419	635
Cairnie	1618	Aberdeen / Banff	Aberdeenshire	Botarie and Ruthven (-1710)	6,184	569
Callander	Medieval	Perthshire	Stirling		17,698	3,463
Cambuslang	Medieval	Lanarkshire	South Lanarkshire		2,424	26,426
Cambusnethan	Medieval	Lanarkshire	North Lanarkshire		4,371	44,218
Cameron	1646	Fife	Fife		3,049	415
Campbeltown	1617	Argyllshire	Argyll and Bute	Lochead (-1700)	17,727	6,230
Campsie	Medieval	Stirlingshire	East Dunbartonshire		7,339	10,630
Canisbay	Medieval	Caithness	Highland		10,098	927
Canonbie	Medieval	Dumfriesshire	Dumfries & Galloway		7,628	1,192
Caputh	Medieval	Perth / Forfarshire	Perth and Kinross		5,121	688
Cardross	Medieval	Dunbartonshire	Arg & But / W Dunb		4,487	12,286
Careston	1641	Forfarshire	Angus	Carretstone	N/A	N/A
Cargill	Medieval	Perthshire	Perth and Kinross		4,836	1,255
Carluke	Medieval	Lanarkshire	South Lanarkshire	Eglismaluag	7,076	18,329
Carmichael	Medieval	Lanarkshire	South Lanarkshire		6,711	991
Carmunnock	Medieval	Lanark / Renfrew	Glasgow / S Lanark		1,022	24,482
Carmyllie	1609	Forfarshire	Angus		2,892	477
Carnbee	Medieval	Fife	Fife	Kellie	2,054	320
Carnock	Medieval	Fife	Fife		1,696	5,927
Carnwath	Medieval	Lanarkshire	South Lanarkshire		12,927	6,166
Carrington	Medieval	Midlothian	Midlothian		3,523	316
Carsphairn	1640	Kirkcudbrightshire	Dum & Gal / E Ayr		30,307	201
Carstairs	Medieval	Lanarkshire	South Lanarkshire		1,900	1,986
Castleton	Medieval	Roxburghshire	Scottish Borders	Liddesdale	26,931	1,057
Cathcart	Medieval	Lanark / Renfrew	E Ren / Glas / S Lan		1,183	62,519
Cavers	Medieval	Roxburghshire	Scottish Borders	Cavers Magna	11,257	1,085
Cawdor	Medieval	Inverness / Nairn	Highland	Barevan, Baraven	4,594	560
Ceres	Medieval	Fife	Fife		3,901	1,455
Channelkirk	Medieval	Berwickshire	Scottish Borders	Childeschirche	5,393	492
Chapel of Garioch	Medieval	Aberdeenshire	Aberdeenshire	Logie Durno	6,920	1,705
Chirnside	Medieval	Berwickshire	Scottish Borders		2,646	1,751
Clackmannan	Medieval	Clackmannanshire	Clackmannanshire		2,894	3,773
Clatt	Medieval	Aberdeenshire	Aberdeenshire		1,830	155
Cleish	Medieval	Kinross-shire	Perth and Kinross		2,819	685
Closeburn	Medieval	Dumfriesshire	Dumfries & Galloway	Kylosburn	12,835	1,146
Clunie	Medieval	Perthshire	Perth and Kinross		3,305	472
Cluny	Medieval	Aberdeenshire	Aberdeenshire		4,420	962
Clyne	Medieval	Sutherland	Highland		15,760	1,765
Cockburnspath	1560	Berwickshire	Scottish Borders	Colbrandspeth	6,046	761
Cockpen	Medieval	Midlothian	Midlothian		1,131	10,466
Coldingham	Medieval	Berwickshire	Scottish Borders		11,146	1,919
Coldstream	Medieval	Berwickshire	Scottish Borders	Lennel (-1718)	3,575	2,260
Coll	Med/1865	Argyllshire	Argyll and Bute		7,600	195
Collace	Medieval	Perthshire	Perth and Kinross		2,531	528
Collessie	Medieval	Fife	Fife		1,745	1,921
Colmonell	Medieval	Ayrshire	South Ayrshire		29,844	952
Colonsay and Oronsay	1861	Argyllshire	Argyll and Bute	Kilchattan	4,581	132
Colvend and Southwick	1612	Kirkcudbrightshire	Dumfries & Galloway		7,030	974
Comrie	Medieval	Perthshire	Per & Kin / Stirling		32,006	2,513
Contin	Medieval	Ross and Cromarty	Highland		60,880	1,055
Cortachy and Clova	1618	Forfarshire	Angus		21,977	305
Coull	Medieval	Aberdeenshire	Aberdeenshire		3,867	264
Coupar Angus	Medieval	Fife, Perthshire	Perth and Kinross	Coupar	1,617	2,667
Covington	Medieval	Lanarkshire	South Lanarkshire		2,177	772
Coylton	Medieval	Ayrshire	East Ayr / South Ayr		6,603	3,770
Craig	Medieval	Forfarshire	Angus	Inchbrayock	1,071	1,292
Craigie	Medieval	Ayrshire	South Ayrshire		2,695	424
Craignish	Medieval	Argyllshire	Argyll and Bute	Kilmorie/Kilmory	4,817	374
Crail	Medieval	Fife	Fife		2,063	1,812
Crailing	Medieval	Roxburghshire	Scottish Borders		1,851	241
Cramond	Medieval	Midlothian	Edinburgh	Most of parish incorporated into city and parish of Edinburgh in 1920, leaving reduced parish just covering offshore islands of Inchmickery and Cow and Calves.	N/A	N/A
Cranshaws	Medieval	Berwickshire	Scottish Borders		5,337	95
Cranston	Medieval	Midlothian	Midlothian	Cranstoun	1,274	601
Crathie and Braemar	1626	Aberdeenshire	Aberdeenshire		76,584	808
Crawford	Medieval	Lanarkshire	South Lanarkshire		24,574	871
Crawfordjohn	Medieval	Lanarkshire	South Lanarkshire		11,623	546
Creich	Medieval	Fife	Fife		1,013	190
Creich	Medieval	Sutherland	Highland		15,514	1,111
Crichton	Medieval	Midlothian	Midlothian		3,259	1,223
Crieff	Medieval	Perthshire	Perth and Kinross		5,097	7,236
Crimond	Medieval	Aberdeenshire	Aberdeenshire		42	851
Cromarty	Medieval	Ross and Cromarty	Highland		2,529	906
Cromdale, Inverallan and Advie	c1550	Morayshire	Highland	Partly in Inverness-shire until 1862	27,496	3,295
Cross and Burness	c1560	Orkney	Orkney		4,136	408
Crossmichael	Medieval	Kirkcudbrightshire	Dumfries & Galloway		4,110	2,287
Croy and Dalcross	1618	Inv/Nairn (-1891), Inverness (1891-)	Highland		6,073	1,692
Cruden	Medieval	Aberdeenshire	Aberdeenshire		7,494	3,502
Cullen	Medieval	Banffshire	Moray		455	1,628
Culross	Medieval	Fife	Fife	Detached part of Perthshire until 1891	2,409	4,348
Culsalmond	Medieval	Aberdeenshire	Aberdeenshire		4,063	492
Culter	Medieval	Lanarkshire	South Lanarkshire	Coulter	4,177	278
Cults	Medieval	Fife	Fife		1,608	392
Cumbernauld	1649	Dunbartonshire	North Lanarkshire		4,974	50,945
Cumbrae	Medieval	Bute	North Ayrshire		1,430	1,376
Cummertrees	Medieval	Dumfriesshire	Dumfries & Galloway		2,138	507
Cupar		Fife	Fife		2,452	11,183
Currie		Midlothian	City of Edinburgh		5,425	13,640
Dailly		Ayrshire	South Ayrshire	Dalmakeran	17,918	1,272
Dairsie		Fife	Fife		1,138	387
Dalgety		Fife	Fife		714	10,777
Dalkeith	1467	Midlothian	Midlothian		858	7,075
Dallas		Morayshire	Moray		9,674	405
Dalmellington		Ayrshire	East Ayrshire		3,204	3,603
Dalmeny		Linlithgowshire	City of Edinburgh	Partly in Midlothian until 1891. Contained area of ancient parish of Auldcathie from 1618 until 1891.	2,448	9,388
Dalry		Kirkcudbrightshire	Dumfries and Galloway		3,382	510
Dalry		Ayrshire	North Ayrshire		9,082	6,252
Dalrymple		Ayrshire	East Ayrshire		3,595	1,917
Dalserf		Lanarkshire	South Lanarkshire	Machanshire (-1655)	3,459	17,683
Dalton		Dumfriesshire	Dumfries and Galloway	Meikle Dalton, Dalton Magna	3,921	614
Dalziel		Lanarkshire	North Lanarkshire		1,408	30,968
Daviot		Aberdeenshire	Aberdeenshire		2,429	855
Daviot and Dunlichity	1618	Inverness-shire Nairnshire	Highland		23,440	1,256
Delting	Medieval	Zetland	Shetland		14,716	1,864
Denny	1601	Stirlingshire	Falkirk		3,459	18,300
Deskford		Banffshire	Moray		2,762	189
Dingwall		Ross and Cromarty	Highland		404	5,804
Dirleton		Haddingtonshire	East Lothian	Gullane (-1612)	3,153	3,893
Dollar		Clackmannanshire	Clackmannanshire		1,908	3,035
Dolphinton		Lanarkshire	South Lanarkshire		1,264	255
Dores		Inverness-shire	Highland		13,975	559
Dornoch		Sutherland	Highland		15,238	2,478
Dornock		Dumfriesshire	Dumfries and Galloway		2,500	2,235
Douglas		Lanarkshire	South Lanarkshire		14,437	2,301
Drainie		Morayshire	Moray		3,558	8,653
Dreghorn		Ayrshire	North Ayrshire		2,769	6,296
Dron		Perthshire	Perth and Kinross		3,299	270
Drumblade		Aberdeenshire	Aberdeenshire		5,417	502
Drumelzier		Peeblesshire	Scottish Borders		N/A	N/A
Drumoak		Aberdeenshire Kincardineshire	Aberdeenshire	Dalmaik, Dalmayock	2,813	1,409
Dryfesdale		Dumfriesshire	Dumfries and Galloway		2,997	4,580
Drymen		Stirlingshire	Stirling		8,290	1,650
Duffus		Morayshire	Moray		3,033	4,610
Duirinish		Inverness-shire	Highland	Absorbed old parish of Trumpan	32,505	1,464
Dull		Perthshire	Perth and Kinross		25,489	2,517
Dumbarton		Dunbartonshire	West Dunbartonshire		607	13,720
Dumfries		Dumfriesshire	Dumfries and Galloway		2,805	22,085
Dun		Forfarshire	Angus		1,338	418
Dunbar		Haddingtonshire	East Lothian		1,369	9,270
Dunbarney		Perthshire	Perth and Kinross		1,750	2,910
Dunblane and Lecropt	1900	Perthshire Stirlingshire	Stirling		7,782	9,521
Dunbog		Fife	Fife		1,344	133
Dundee		Forfarshire	Angus; Dundee City; Perth and Kinross		5,291	146,637
Dundee Combination		Forfarshire	Angus; Dundee City	Dundee Combination parish formerly covered most of the city of Dundee until 1972 when the whole area within the city boundary was made the parish of Dundee, leaving a small residual part of Dundee Combination outside the city boundary as a separate parish.	N/A	N/A
Dundonald		Ayrshire	North Ayrshire; South Ayrshire		4,436	22,386
Dunfermline		Fife Kinross-shire	Fife		6,909	69,815
Dunino		Fife	Fife		1,231	134
Dunipace		Stirlingshire	Falkirk		2,192	3,487
Dunkeld and Dowally	1627	Perthshire	Perth and Kinross		8,936	601
Dunlop		Ayrshire Renfrewshire	East Ayrshire		2,688	1,583
Dunnet		Caithness	Highland		5,241	582
Dunnichen		Forfarshire	Angus		3,398	2,105
Dunning		Perthshire	Perth and Kinross		5,448	1,260
Dunnottar		Kincardineshire	Aberdeenshire		3,189	1,743
Dunoon and Kilmun	1690	Argyllshire	Argyll and Bute		28,889	12,620
Dunrossness	Medieval	Zetland	Shetland		11,687	3,216
Duns		Berwickshire	Scottish Borders		4,126	3,192
Dunscore		Dumfriesshire	Dumfries and Galloway		6,230	826
Dunsyre		Lanarkshire	South Lanarkshire		N/A	N/A
Durisdeer		Dumfriesshire	Dumfries and Galloway		7,695	317
Durness		Sutherland	Highland	Ardurness	65,026	347
Durris		Kincardineshire	Aberdeenshire		5,375	628
Duthil and Rothiemurchus	1625	Inverness-shire Morayshire (-1870)	Highland		27,868	5,149
Dyce		Aberdeenshire	Aberdeen City		2,170	5,813
Dyke and Moy	c1560	Morayshire Nairnshire	Moray		5,378	783
Eaglesham		Renfrewshire	East Renfrewshire		5,773	4,647
Earlston		Berwickshire Roxburghshire	Scottish Borders		1,695	1,976
Eassie and Nevay	1600	Forfarshire	Angus		1,854	143
East Kilbride		Lanarkshire	East Renfrewshire; South Lanarkshire		8,961	77,280
Eastwood		Renfrewshire	East Renfrewshire; Glasgow City	Pollock, Nether Pollock	2,138	57,707
Eccles		Berwickshire	Scottish Borders		4,970	809
Ecclesmachan		Linlithgowshire	West Lothian		1,886	621
Echt		Aberdeenshire	Aberdeenshire		4,732	761
Eckford		Roxburghshire	Scottish Borders		3,419	252
Eday		Orkney	Orkney		3,209	160
Edderton		Ross and Cromarty	Highland		7,215	308
Eddleston		Peeblesshire	Scottish Borders		7,954	628
Eddrachillis	1724	Sutherland	Highland		58,896	688
Edinburgh		Edinburgh; Midlothian	City of Edinburgh; Midlothian		13,485	447,064
Edinkillie		Morayshire	Highland; Moray	Logie Fythenach	14,534	416
Ednam		Roxburghshire	Scottish Borders		1,922	417
Edrom		Berwickshire	Scottish Borders		3,394	458
Edzell		Forfarshire	Aberdeenshire; Angus		7,887	998
Elgin		Morayshire	Moray		8,069	11,704
Elie	1641	Fife	Fife		1,610	861
Ellon		Aberdeenshire	Aberdeenshire		9,366	11,476
Errol		Perthshire	Perth and Kinross		4,146	2,467
Erskine		Renfrewshire	Renfrewshire		2,314	8,779
Eskdalemuir	1703	Dumfriesshire	Dumfries and Galloway		15,483	252
Ettrick		Selkirkshire	Scottish Borders		10,333	83
Evie and Rendall	c1560	Orkney	Orkney		5,501	729
Ewes		Dumfriesshire	Dumfries and Galloway		7,498	82
Eyemouth	1618	Berwickshire	Scottish Borders		925	2,838
Fala and Soutra	1618	Haddingtonshire Midlothian	Midlothian; Scottish Borders		1,516	95
Falkirk		Stirlingshire	Falkirk		5,896	46,702
Falkland		Fife	Fife	Kilgour.	2,745	2,616
Farnell		Forfarshire	Angus	Chapelry of Cookston or Kinnaird became independent parish by C15th, later re-absorbed.	3,273	288
Farr		Caithness	Highland		97,388	955
Fearn	1640	Ross & Cromarty	Highland		2,694	1,885
Fenwick	1641	Ayrshire	East Ayrshire		6,548	1,487
Fern		Forfarshire	Angus		3,150	499
Ferry Port on Craig	1606	Fife	Fife		132	3,815
Fetlar	Medieval	Zetland	Shetland		4,077	61
Fettercairn		Kincardineshire	Aberdeenshire; Angus		5,672	1,105
Fetteresso		Kincardineshire	Aberdeenshire		11,598	14,845
Findo Gask		Perthshire	Perth and Kinross		882	277
Fintray		Aberdeenshire	Aberdeenshire		4,002	945
Fintry		Stirlingshire	Stirling		4,777	546
Firth		Orkney	Orkney	United with Orphir and Stenness at Reformation; Orphir re-separated c. 1605; Stenness separated 1878.	3,670	877
Flisk		Fife	Fife		1,100	92
Fodderty		Ross & Cromarty	Highland	Absorbed ancient parish of Kinnettes	33,264	2,869
Fogo		Berwickshire	Scottish Borders		2,405	165
Fordoun		Kincardineshire	Aberdeenshire		7,929	1,491
Fordyce		Banffshire	Aberdeenshire		5,736	2,531
Forfar		Forfarshire	Angus	Restenneth	2,760	15,001
Forgan		Fife	Fife		3,676	4,573
Forgandenny		Perth / Kinross	Perth and Kinross		1,746	935
Forglen		Banffshire	Aberdeenshire		2,732	321
Forgue		Aberdeenshire	Aberdeenshire	Frendraught	9,006	879
Forres		Morayshire	Moray		1,887	9,393
Forteviot		Perthshire	Perth and Kinross	Absorbed ancient parish of Muckersie in 1618.	5,654	382
Fortingall		Perthshire	Perth and Kinross	Absorbed ancient parish of Rannoch or Killichonan.	93,909	864
Fossoway		Kinross-shire Perthshire	Perth and Kinross		6,456	1,641
Foulden		Berwickshire	Scottish Borders		1,497	371
Foveran		Aberdeenshire	Aberdeenshire		3,967	2,393
Fowlis Easter		Forfarshire Perthshire	Angus; Dundee City		1,839	415
Fowlis Wester		Perthshire	Perth and Kinross		5,148	629
Fraserburgh		Aberdeenshire	Aberdeenshire	Philorth	2,079	13,323
Fyvie		Aberdeenshire	Aberdeenshire		10,353	3,144
Gairloch		Ross & Cromarty	Highland		92,448	2,326
Galashiels		RoxburghshireSelkirkshire	Scottish Borders	Lindean (-1622)	1,405	10,081
Galston		Ayrshire	East Ayrshire		5,978	5,459
Gamrie		Aberdeenshire Banffshire	Aberdeenshire		5,746	5,301
Gargunnock		Stirlingshire	Stirling		4,838	1,049
Gartly		Aberdeenshire Banffshire	Aberdeenshire		6,301	340
Garvald and Bara	1702	Haddingtonshire	East Lothian		5,926	305
Garvock		Kincardineshire	Aberdeenshire		3,265	304
Gigha and Cara	1726	Argyllshire	Argyll and Bute		1,489	163
Girthon		Kirkcudbrightshire	Dumfries and Galloway		14,159	699
Girvan		Ayrshire	South Ayrshire		5,896	6,968
Gladsmuir	1691	Haddingtonshire	East Lothian		2,444	3,837
Glamis		Forfarshire	Angus		6,014	1,013
Glasgow		Lanarkshire Renfrewshire	East Dunbartonshire; Glasgow City; North Lanarkshire		5,848	220,415
Glass		Aberdeenshire Banffshire	Aberdeenshire		6,635	279
Glassary		Argyllshire	Argyll and Bute		21,247	3,553
Glasserton		Wigtownshire	Dumfries and Galloway		6,105	332
Glassford		Lanarkshire	South Lanarkshire		1,728	1,467
Glenbervie		Kincardineshire	Aberdeenshire		8,737	778
Glenbuchat	1470	Aberdeenshire	Aberdeenshire		4,842	61
Glencairn		Dumfriesshire	Dumfries and Galloway		12,202	890
Glencorse	1646	Midlothian	Midlothian	St Catherine's of the Hopes	2,560	5,293
Glendevon		Perthshire	Perth and Kinross		4,677	174
Glenelg		Inverness-shire	Highland	AKA Kilchuimin. Absorbed ancient parish of Knoydart or Kilchoan.	44,853	1,473
Glenisla		Forfarshire	Angus		19,361	196
Glenmuick, Tullich and Glengairn	c1625	Aberdeenshire	Aberdeenshire		27,577	1,982
Glenorchy and Inishail	1618	Argyllshire	Argyll and Bute; Highland		52,355	1,208
Glenshiel	1826	Ross & Cromarty	Highland		27,560	215
Golspie		Sutherland	Highland	Culmallie, Kilmalie	5,789	1,661
Gordon		Berwickshire	Scottish Borders		2,523	649
Govan		LanarkshireRenfrewshire	Glasgow City; Renfrewshire		2,650	118,706
Grange	1618	Banffshire	Moray		6,010	638
Grangemouth	1724	Stirlingshire	Falkirk	Polmont (-1900)	4,187	37,255
Greenlaw		Berwickshire	Scottish Borders		5,609	847
Greenock	1594	Renfrewshire	Inverclyde		3,731	31,417
Gretna		Dumfriesshire	Dumfries and Galloway		3,139	3,984
Guthrie		Forfarshire	Angus		1,718	147
Haddington		Haddingtonshire	East Lothian		5,131	9,766
Half Morton	1839	Dumfriesshire	Dumfries and Galloway		3,837	208
Halkirk		Caithness	Highland	Formed c. 1560 by the merger of the ancient parishes of Halkirk and Skinnet.	38,492	1,460
Hamilton		Lanarkshire	South Lanarkshire	Cadzow.	5,874	53,503
Harris		Inverness-shire	Na h-Eileanan Siar	Absorbed old parish of Rodel.	50,534	2,054
Hawick		Roxburghshire	Scottish Borders	Absorbed the old parish of Wilton	6,163	14,869
Heriot		Midlothian	Scottish Borders		7,271	321
Hobkirk		Roxburghshire	Scottish Borders	Hopekirk, Roule	6,882	442
Hoddom		Dumfriesshire	Dumfries and Galloway		4,232	1,279
Holm		Orkney	Orkney	Holm & Paplay	3,039	739
Holywood		Dumfriesshire	Dumfries and Galloway	Dercongal	3,974	822
Houston and Killellan	1759	Renfrewshire	Renfrewshire		3,346	4,915
Hownam		Roxburghshire	Scottish Borders		5,454	74
Hoy and Graemsay	c1560	Orkney	Orkney		12,274	73
Humbie		Haddingtonshire Midlothian	East Lothian	Keith Humbie	3,266	383
Hume		Berwickshire	Scottish Borders		1,001	109
Huntly	1567	Aberdeenshire	Aberdeenshire	Kinnoir and Dunbennan (-1725)	3,167	4,954
Hutton		Berwickshire	Scottish Borders		2,356	545
Hutton and Corrie	1609	Dumfriesshire	Dumfries & Galloway		15,202	365
Inch		Wigtownshire	Dumfries & Galloway		17,231	6,598
Inchinnan		Renfrewshire	Renfrewshire		1,234	14,976
Inchture		Perthshire	Perth and Kinross		1,800	1,440
Innerleithen		Peeblesshire Selkirkshire	Scottish Borders		9,792	3,980
Innerwick		Haddingtonshire	East Lothian; Scottish Borders		5,481	573
Insch		Aberdeenshire	Aberdeenshire		1,792	1,861
Inveraray		Argyllshire	Argyll and Bute	Kilmalieu, Glenaray	19,200	769
Inverarity		Forfarshire	Angus		4,824	422
Inveravon		Banffshire Morayshire	Moray	Strathavon	23,106	913
Inverchaolain		Argyllshire	Argyll and Bute		3,160	110
Inveresk		Midlothian	East Lothian; City of Edinburgh		2,114	24,835
Inverkeilor		Forfarshire	Angus		6,495	1,104
Inverkeithing		Fife	Fife		1,277	8,090
Inverkeithny		Aberdeenshire Banffshire	Aberdeenshire	Conveth	3,576	367
Inverkip		Renfrewshire	Inverclyde		3,267	29,196
Inverness and Bona	1618	Inverness-shire	Highland		11,725	61,489
Inverurie		Aberdeenshire	Aberdeenshire		922	10,857
Irvine		Ayrshire	North Ayrshire		2,125	27,518
Jedburgh		Roxburghshire	Scottish Borders	Formed by the union of Jedworth, Old Jedworth and Upper Crailing parishes.	9,662	4,649
Johnstone		Dumfriesshire	Dumfries & Galloway		5,371	400
Jura	Med/1861	Argyllshire	Argyll and Bute	Killearnadale	38,625	196
Keig		Aberdeenshire	Aberdeenshire		1,944	274
Keir	1632	Dumfriesshire	Dumfries & Galloway		2,298	316
Keith		Banffshire Morayshire	Moray		6,233	5,705
Keithhall and Kinkell	1754	Aberdeenshire	Aberdeenshire	Union of two ancient parishes: Keithhall (aka Monkegie) and Kinkell.	2,602	1,211
Kells		Kirkcudbrightshire	Dumfries & Galloway		21,317	664
Kelso		Roxburghshire	Scottish Borders	Comprises the ancient parishes of Kelso (St Mary's), Maxwell, Roxburgh Holy Sepulchre, Roxburgh St James, and the oldest part of Roxburgh parish.	2,266	7,249
Kelton		Kirkcudbrightshire	Dumfries & Galloway		3,876	3,340
Kemback		Fife	Fife		1,760	558
Kemnay		Aberdeenshire	Aberdeenshire		2,479	4,342
Kenmore		Perthshire	Perth and Kinross; Stirling	Inchadney	25,543	572
Kennethmont		Aberdeenshire	Aberdeenshire		2,438	460
Kennoway		Fife	Fife		1,580	5,077
Kettins		Forfarshire	Perth and Kinross	Partly in Perthshire until 1891	3,355	632
Kettle		Fife	Fife	AKA Lathrisk.	3,456	1,645
Kilbarchan		Renfrewshire	Renfrewshire		4,119	19,841
Kilbirnie		Ayrshire	North Ayrshire		4,166	7,730
Kilbrandon and Kilchattan	1650	Argyllshire	Argyll and Bute	Union of two ancient parishes of Kilbrandon (or Seil) and Kilchattan (or Luing)	3,494	808
Kilbride		Bute	North Ayrshire		16,439	3,271
Kilcalmonell	Med/1891	Argyllshire	Argyll and Bute		7,567	1,324
Kilchoman		Argyllshire	Argyll and Bute		14,796	760
Kilchrenan and Dalavich	1661	Argyllshire	Argyll and Bute	Two ancient parishes united at an unknown date.	19,377	182
Kilconquhar		Fife	Fife		3,688	1,140
Kildalton		Argyllshire	Argyll and Bute		15,434	1,077
Kildonan		Sutherland	Highland		35,460	725
Kildrummy		Aberdeenshire	Aberdeenshire		6,898	321
Kilfinan		Argyllshire	Argyll and Bute		13,473	777
Kilfinichen and Kilvickeon	1625	Argyllshire	Argyll and Bute	Comprises area of at least three ancient parishes (Kilfinichen, Kilvickeon and Iona); became part of single parish of Mull, then Ross; Ross split into this parish and Torosay in 1728.	37,029	745
Killarow and Kilmeny	Med/1769	Argyllshire	Argyll and Bute		31,580	1,391
Killean and Kilchenzie	1636	Argyllshire	Argyll and Bute	Two ancient parishes united at an unknown date.	18,872	539
Killearn		Stirlingshire	Stirling		7,240	2,382
Killearnan		Ross and Cromarty	Highland	AKA Ederdour.	3,014	697
Killin		Perthshire	Stirling		47,051	1,291
Kilmacolm		Renfrewshire	Inverclyde		8,581	5,264
Kilmadock		Perthshire	Stirling		15,729	2,375
Kilmallie		ArgyllshireInverness-shire	Highland		80,806	10,395
Kilmany		Fife	Fife		2,055	218
Kilmarnock		Ayrshire	East Ayrshire		3,895	34,858
Kilmaronock		Dunbartonshire	Stirling; West Dunbartonshire		4,816	814
Kilmartin		Argyllshire	Argyll and Bute		10,700	536
Kilmaurs		Ayrshire	East Ayrshire		2,630	8,103
Kilmodan		Argyllshire	Argyll and Bute		11,143	177
Kilmonivaig		Inverness-shire	Highland		111,192	3,611
Kilmorack		Inverness-shire	Highland	Partly in Ross and Cromarty until 1891	17,549	2,329
Kilmore and Kilbride	1636	Argyllshire	Argyll and Bute	Two ancient parishes united prior to 1636.	17,462	10,326
Kilmory		Bute	North Ayrshire		26,694	1,389
Kilmuir		Inverness-shire	Highland	Formerly Kilmaluag.	13,576	813
Kilmuir Easter		Ross and Cromarty	Highland		1,946	1,100
Kilninian and Kilmore	1628	Argyllshire	Argyll and Bute	Comprises area of at least two ancient parishes (Kilninian and Kilmore/Kilcolmkill); all merged into single parish of Mull at Reformation; this parish separated from Mull in 1688 (remainder became Ross).	30,151	1,606
Kilninver and Kilmelfort	c1525	Argyllshire	Argyll and Bute	Two ancient parishes united at an unknown date.	15,116	395
Kilrenny		Fife	Fife		1,831	2,775
Kilspindie		Perthshire	Perth and Kinross		1,634	190
Kilsyth		Stirlingshire	Falkirk; North Lanarkshire	Monyabroch (-1649)	5,090	11,530
Kiltarlity and Convinth	c1500	Inverness-shire	Highland	Two parishes united c. 1500.	68,820	1,692
Kiltearn		Ross and Cromarty	Highland	Absorbed ancient parish of Lemlair 1618.	30,836	1,982
Kilwinning		Ayrshire	North Ayrshire		3,696	19,475
Kincardine O'Neil		Aberdeenshire	Aberdeenshire		7,561	2,580
Kincardine		Ross and Cromarty	Highland		91,725	648
Kincardine		Perthshire	Stirling		6,112	1,148
Kinclaven		Perthshire	Perth and Kinross		2,807	346
Kinellar		Aberdeenshire	Aberdeenshire		1,612	3,169
Kinfauns		Perthshire	Perth and Kinross		1,020	525
King Edward		Aberdeenshire Banffshire	Aberdeenshire		7,962	1,284
Kingarth		Bute	Argyll and Bute	AKA Kilblaan.	4,136	380
Kinghorn		Fife	Fife		3,488	4,201
Kinglassie		Fife	Fife	Partly in Kinross-shire until 1891	3,382	22,543
Kingoldrum		Forfarshire	Angus		N/A	N/A
Kingsbarns	1631	Fife	Fife		2,489	443
Kingussie and Insh	1580	Inverness-shire	Highland		81,267	3,100
Kinloch		Perthshire	Perth and Kinross	Formerly Lundeiff.	329	92
Kinloss	1657	Morayshire	Moray	Created in 1657 out of portions of the parishes of Rafford, Alves and Forres.	2,985	2,842
Kinnaird		Perthshire	Perth and Kinross		1,208	93
Kinneff and Catterline	1719	Kincardineshire	Aberdeenshire	Union of two ancient parishes.	2,205	677
Kinnell		Forfarshire	Angus		1,552	523
Kinnettles		Forfarshire	Angus		634	95
Kinnoull		Perthshire	Perth and Kinross		1,758	3,785
Kinross		Kinross-shire	Perth and Kinross		2,598	5,307
Kintail		Ross and Cromarty	Highland	Medieval.	3,195	300
Kintore		Aberdeenshire	Aberdeenshire		2,755	6,355
Kippen		Stirlingshire	Stirling	Partly in Perthshire until 1891	4,859	1,984
Kirkbean		Kirkcudbrightshire	Dumfries & Galloway		2,374	551
Kirkcaldy and Dysart	1901	Fife	Fife	Formed by the 1901 amalgamation of the ancient parishes of Kirkcaldy and Dysart and the post-Reformation parish of Abbotshall.	3,087	49,918
Kirkcolm		Wigtownshire	Dumfries & Galloway		5,809	669
Kirkconnel		Dumfriesshire	Dumfries & Galloway		11,565	2,361
Kirkcowan		Wigtownshire	Dumfries & Galloway		21,573	758
Kirkcudbright		Kirkcudbrightshire	Dumfries & Galloway		4,166	3,203
Kirkden		Forfarshire	Angus	Idvies	1,839	911
Kirkgunzeon		Kirkcudbrightshire	Dumfries & Galloway		4,875	278
Kirkhill		Inverness-shire	Highland	Union of the ancient parishes of Wardlaw and Farnua in 1618.	4,432	1,825
Kirkhope	1851	Selkirkshire	Scottish Borders	An ancient parish, but was part of Yarrow parish from c. C17th until 1852.	12,449	263
Kirkinner		Wigtownshire	Dumfries and Galloway	Carnesmoll	5,152	594
Kirkintilloch	1649	Dunbartonshire	East Dunbartonshire; North Lanarkshire	AKA Lenzie.	2,713	29,526
Kirkliston		Linlithgowshire	City of Edinburgh; West Lothian	Contains area of ancient parish of Auldcathie.	4,500	7,265
Kirkmabreck		Kirkcudbrightshire	Dumfries & Galloway		10,422	980
Kirkmahoe		Dumfriesshire	Dumfries & Galloway		4,939	745
Kirkmaiden		Wigtownshire	Dumfries & Galloway		4,939	680
Kirkmichael		Dumfriesshire	Dumfries & Galloway		6,884	537
Kirkmichael		Banffshire	Moray		30,260	606
Kirkmichael		Perthshire	Perth and Kinross	AKA Strathardle.	30,386	795
Kirkmichael		Ayrshire	South Ayrshire		9,596	1,549
Kirknewton		Midlothian	West Lothian	Absorbed ancient parish of East Calder 1751.	3,017	7,188
Kirkoswald		Ayrshire	South Ayrshire	AKA Turnberry.	6,491	1,269
Kirkpatrick Durham		Kirkcudbrightshire	Dumfries & Galloway		8,969	708
Kirkpatrick Irongray		Kirkcudbrightshire	Dumfries & Galloway		5,356	350
Kirkpatrick-Fleming		Dumfriesshire	Dumfries & Galloway		3,635	802
Kirkpatrick-Juxta		Dumfriesshire	Dumfries & Galloway	Partly in Lanarkshire until 1891	14,648	899
Kirkurd		Peeblesshire	Scottish Borders		3,846	218
Kirkwall and St Ola	c1590	Orkney	Orkney		5,183	8,268
Kirriemuir		Forfarshire	Angus		5,381	7,009
Knockando		Morayshire	Moray		10,365	834
Knockbain	1756	Ross and Cromarty	Highland	Formed in 1750 by the union of Kilmuir Wester and Suddy.	5,452	2,295
Lady		Orkney	Orkney	Medieval.	1,628	158
Ladykirk		Berwickshire	Scottish Borders	AKA East Upsettlington. Contains area of ancient parish of Horndean.	1,381	136
Laggan		Inverness-shire	Highland		40,591	266
Lairg		Sutherland	Highland		50,327	891
Lamington and Wandel	1608	Lanarkshire	South Lanarkshire	Union in 1608 of medieval parishes of Wandel (aka Hartside) and Lamington.	4,968	133
Lanark		Lanarkshire	South Lanarkshire		4,384	10,443
Langholm	1702	Dumfriesshire	Dumfries & Galloway	Created in 1702 by the union of the former parishes of Staplegorton, Wauchope and part of Morton.	9,868	2,455
Langton		Berwickshire	Scottish Borders		2,005	310
Larbert		Stirlingshire	Falkirk		1,499	23,977
Largo		Fife	Fife		1,389	2,524
Largs		Ayrshire	North Ayrshire		6,801	14,759
Lasswade		Midlothian	City of Edinburgh; Midlothian		4,692	18,126
Latheron		Caithness	Highland		49,088	1,805
Lauder		Berwickshire Roxburghshire	Scottish Borders		15,061	2,078
Laurencekirk		Kincardineshire	Aberdeenshire		1,904	3,126
Legerwood		Berwickshire	Scottish Borders		4,310	271
Leochel-Cushnie	1795	Aberdeenshire	Aberdeenshire		5,760	650
Lerwick	1701	Zetland	Shetland		7,193	8,678
Leslie		Aberdeenshire	Aberdeenshire		1,922	251
Leslie		Fife	Fife	Formerly Fettykil.	2,444	12,254
Lesmahagow		Lanarkshire	South Lanarkshire		17,191	13,869
Leswalt		Wigtownshire	Dumfries & Galloway		4,112	5,488
Lethendy		Perthshire	Perth and Kinross		N/A	N/A
Lethnot and Navar	1723	Forfarshire	Angus		10,633	71
Leuchars		Fife	Fife		5,324	5,754
Libberton		Lanarkshire	South Lanarkshire		3,347	454
Liff and Benvie	1753	Forfarshire	Angus; Dundee City	Union of two ancient parishes. Partly in Perthshire in 1891.	1,000	3,257
Lilliesleaf		Roxburghshire	Scottish Borders		2,420	419
Linlithgow		Linlithgowshire	West Lothian		4,058	15,271
Linton		Roxburghshire	Scottish Borders		2,139	162
Lintrathen		Forfarshire	Angus		7,744	369
Lismore and Appin	c1525	Argyllshire	Argyll and Bute; Highland	Union of the two ancient parishes of Lismore and Eilean Munde (aka Glencoe, comprising the district now known as Appin).	65,907	2,477
Little Dunkeld		Perthshire	Perth and Kinross		16,685	2,172
Livingston		Linlithgowshire	West Lothian		1,878	31,450
Lochalsh		Ross and Cromarty	Highland	Medieval. AKA Kilchoan.	44,368	1,904
Lochbroom		Ross and Cromarty	Highland	Medieval.	105,136	2,487
Lochcarron	1726?	Ross and Cromarty	Highland	Medieval.	41,095	893
Lochgoilhead and Kilmorich	C15th	Argyllshire	Argyll and Bute		27,294	756
Lochlee	1723	Forfarshire	Angus		22,143	79
Lochmaben		Dumfriesshire	Dumfries & Galloway		4,536	2,907
Lochrutton		Kirkcudbrightshire	Dumfries & Galloway		3,310	565
Lochs	1722	Ross and Cromarty	Na h-Eileanan Siar	May or may not have been medieval. Had a detached portion at Carloway, which was split between Barvas and Uig parishes in 1891.	49,162	1,810
Lochwinnoch		Renfrewshire	Renfrewshire		7,541	6,638
Logie		Fife	Fife		1,896	243
Logie		Stirlingshire	Stirling	AKA Logie-Airthrie. Partly in Clackmannanshire and Perthshire until 1891	2,594	13,046
Logie Buchan		Aberdeenshire	Aberdeenshire		2,120	374
Logie Easter		Ross and Cromarty	Highland		4,691	658
Logie Pert	1647	Forfarshire	Angus		2,390	498
Logiealmond	1891	Perthshire	Perth and Kinross		7,536	248
Logie-Coldstone	1618	Aberdeenshire	Aberdeenshire		6,875	394
Logierait		Perthshire	Perth and Kinross		15,397	1,288
Longforgan		Perthshire	Dundee City; Perth and Kinross		1,936	2,982
Longformacus		Berwickshire	Scottish Borders		9,004	192
Longside	1620	Aberdeenshire	Aberdeenshire		5,796	3,342
Lonmay		Aberdeenshire	Aberdeenshire	AKA St Colm.	6,739	1,699
Loth		Sutherland	Highland		6,790	139
Loudoun		Ayrshire	East Ayrshire		6,109	6,977
Lumphanan		Aberdeenshire	Aberdeenshire		4,735	1,076
Lunan		Forfarshire	Angus		538	127
Lundie		Forfarshire	Angus		1,617	350
Luss		Dunbartonshire	Argyll and Bute		8,631	272
Lyne	Med/1891	Peeblesshire	Scottish Borders		N/A	N/A
Madderty		Perthshire	Perth and Kinross		1,764	261
Mains and Strathmartine	1792	Forfarshire	Angus / Dundee City		1,633	1,275
Makerstoun		Roxburghshire	Scottish Borders		1,510	140
Manor	1560	Peeblesshire	Scottish Borders		7,544	149
Markinch		Fife	Fife		4,942	16,530
Marnoch		Banffshire	Aberdeenshire	Aberchirder	5,704	1,769
Maryculter	1286	Kincardineshire	Aberdeenshire		3,119	948
Marykirk		Kincardineshire	Aberdeenshire	Aberlethnott	4,340	1,161
Maryton		Forfarshire	Angus	Old Montrose	1,066	189
Mauchline		Ayrshire	East Ayrshire		3,038	4,529
Maxton		Roxburghshire	Scottish Borders	Absorbed ancient parish of Rutherford.	1,872	213
Maybole		Ayrshire	South Ayrshire		6,812	8,797
Mearns		Renfrewshire	East Renfrewshire		5,366	29,957
Meigle		Perthshire	Perth and Kinross		1,643	656
Meldrum		Aberdeenshire	Aberdeenshire	Oldmeldrum, Bethelnie	2,586	3,508
Melrose		Roxburghshire	Scottish Borders		14,008	10,415
Menmuir		Forfarshire	Angus		6,996	375
Mertoun		Berwickshire Roxburghshire	Scottish Borders		2,483	309
Methlick		Aberdeenshire	Aberdeenshire		5,290	1,092
Methven		Perthshire	Perth and Kinross		4,121	2,435
Mid Calder	1646	Linlithgowshire	West Lothian		7,118	33,395
Middlebie	Medieval	Dumfriesshire	Dumfries & Galloway		7,122	1,285
Midmar		Aberdeenshire	Aberdeenshire		3,775	595
Minnigaff		Kirkcudbrightshire	Dumfries & Galloway		36,352	1,731
Minto		Roxburghshire	Scottish Borders	Received part of the defunct parish of Hassendean, 17th century.	2,699	322
Mochrum		Wigtownshire	Dumfries & Galloway		12,323	1,169
Moffat		Dumfriesshire	Dumfries & Galloway	Partly in Lanarkshire until 1891	12,727	2,843
Moneydie		Perthshire	Perth and Kinross		N/A	N/A
Monifieth		Forfarshire	Angus / Dundee City		1,054	9,117
Monikie		Forfarshire	Angus		3,556	1,318
Monimail		Fife	Fife		3,425	653
Monkton and Prestwick	1567	Ayrshire	South Ayrshire		1,844	13,973
Monquhitter	1649	Aberdeenshire	Aberdeenshire		7,090	1,345
Montrose		Forfarshire	Aberdeensh / Angus	AKA Salorch.	2,553	13,514
Monymusk		Aberdeenshire	Aberdeenshire		5,733	724
Monzievaird & Strowan	1590	Perthshire	Perth and Kinross		5,524	819
Mordington		Berwickshire	Scottish Borders		919	145
Moonzie	1625	Fife	Fife		N/A	N/A
Morebattle		Roxburghshire	Scottish Borders	Absorbed ancient parish of Mow in 1672	9,656	537
Morham		Haddingtonshire	East Lothian		908	170
Mortlach		Banffshire	Moray		14,223	2,183
Morton		Dumfriesshire	Dumfries and Galloway	This may not exist. Medieval parish of Morton divided in 1653 between Canonbie and Wauchope. When Wauchope was annexed to Langholm in 1702, the part that had belonged to Morton was re-created as Half Morton.	2,197	1,883
Morvern		Argyllshire	Highland	Absorbed the ancient parish of Killintag.	26,318	294
Moulin		Perthshire	Perth and Kinross		21,876	3,212
Mouswald		Dumfriesshire	Dumfries & Galloway		2,366	304
Moy and Dalarossie	c1500	Inverness-shire	Highland		42,946	631
Muckhart		Perthshire	Clackmannanshire; Perth and Kinross		1,631	674
Muiravonside	1648	Stirlingshire	Falkirk		3,617	5,365
Muirkirk	1631	Ayrshire	East Ayrshire		12,581	1,686
Murroes		Forfarshire	Angus; Dundee City		3,237	1,630
Muthill		Perthshire	Perth and Kinross	Absorbed parts of Strageath upon its dissolution in 1617.	4,597	1,123
Nairn		Nairnshire	Highland		2,847	10,184
Neilston		Renfrewshire	East Renfrewshire; Glasgow City		4,970	22,244
Nenthorn		Berwickshire	Scottish Borders		1,531	168
Nesting	Medieval	Zetland	Shetland		12,915	1,759
New Abbey		Kirkcudbrightshire	Dumfries and Galloway	Lochkindeloch, Kinderloch	7,824	899
New Cumnock	1691	Ayrshire	East Ayrshire		18,779	3,380
New Deer	1622	Aberdeenshire	Aberdeenshire	Auchreddy	11,032	3,029
New Kilpatrick	1649	Dunbartonshire Stirlingshire	East Dunbartonshire; Glasgow City; West Dunbartonshire		5,053	80,585
New Luce	1646	Wigtownshire	Dumfries and Galloway		7,149	89
New Machar	1609	Aberdeenshire Banffshire	Aberdeenshire	Monykebbock	4,247	4,063
New Monkland	1640	Lanarkshire	Falkirk; North Lanarkshire		7,702	44,312
Newbattle		Midlothian	Midlothian		1,663	21,534
Newburgh	1622	Fife	Fife		2,232	2,171
Newburn		Fife	Fife		1,561	204
Newhills	1666	Aberdeenshire	Aberdeen City		3,459	12,701
Newlands		Peeblesshire	Scottish Borders		6,128	699
Newton		Midlothian	City of Edinburgh; Midlothian		856	3,258
Newtyle		Forfarshire	Angus		2,225	950
Nigg, Aberdeen		Kincardineshire	Aberdeen City		682	6,253
Nigg, Highland		Ross and Cromarty	Highland		2,937	266
North Berwick		Haddingtonshire	East Lothian	Medieval. The island of Bass Rock was made its own parish in 1493, but was re-absorbed into North Berwick at the Reformation.	2,043	6,589
North Bute	1844	Bute	Argyll and Bute		7,977	741
North Knapdale	1734	Argyllshire	Argyll and Bute	A medieval parish. Re-formed by the division of the large parish of Knapdale in 1784. AKA Kilmacocharmik.	11,841	491
North Uist	c1560	Inverness-shire	Na h-Eileanan Siar	Union of ancient parishes of Kilmuir and Sand.	33,825	1,481
Northmaven	Medieval	Zetland	Shetland	Northmavine	20,920	794
Oathlaw		Forfarshire	Angus	Finavon	2,596	395
Ochiltree		Ayrshire	East Ayrshire		5,621	4,862
Old Cumnock	1691	Ayrshire	East Ayrshire		10,365	9,054
Old Deer	1622	Aberdeenshire Banffshire	Aberdeenshire		11,457	3,828
Old Kilpatrick	1649	Dunbartonshire	West Dunbartonshire	Medieval. Formerly Kilpatrick.	7,998	44,623
Old Luce	1646	Wigtownshire	Dumfries and Galloway		13,940	1,389
Old Machar	Medieval	Aberdeenshire	Aberdeen City	Old Aberdeen, Aberdeen St Machar's	2,897	22,516
Old Monkland	1640	Lanarkshire	Glasgow City; North Lanarkshire	Monkland.	3,127	82,253
Oldhamstocks		BerwickshireHaddingtonshire	East Lothian; Scottish Borders		2,308	206
Olrig		Caithness	Highland		4,547	1,269
Ordiquhill	1622	Banffshire	Aberdeenshire		2,472	485
Ormiston		Haddingtonshire	East Lothian		1,497	2,287
Orphir		Orkney	Orkney		2,645	537
Orwell	1567	Kinross-shire	Perth and Kinross		5,365	2,634
Oxnam		Roxburghshire	Scottish Borders		9,455	258
Oyne		Aberdeenshire	Aberdeenshire		2,805	473
Paisley		Renfrewshire	East Renfrewshire; Glasgow City; Renfrewshire		7,027	142,435
Panbride		Forfarshire	Angus	St Brigid	2,108	4,025
Papa Westray		Orkney	Orkney		885	90
Parton		Kirkcudbrightshire	Dumfries and Galloway		4,854	176
Peebles		Peeblesshire Selkirkshire	Scottish Borders		7,169	8,754
Pencaitland		Haddingtonshire	East Lothian		3,168	2,599
Penicuik		Midlothian	City of Edinburgh; Midlothian		5,707	11,571
Penninghame		Wigtownshire	Dumfries and Galloway		7,886	3,176
Penpont		Dumfriesshire	Dumfries and Galloway		11,139	734
Perth		Perthshire	Perth and Kinross		985	17,394
Peterculter		Aberdeenshire Kincardineshire	Aberdeen City		4,846	14,874
Peterhead		Aberdeenshire	Aberdeenshire		3,930	20,557
Pettinain		Lanarkshire	South Lanarkshire		1,432	276
Petty		Inverness / Nairn	Highland		4,040	2,090
Pitsligo	1633	Aberdeenshire	Aberdeenshire		916	2,251
Pittenweem	1633	Fife	Fife	Created out of part of Anstruther Wester parish.	54	1,486
Polwarth		Berwickshire	Scottish Borders		1,909	98
Port Glasgow	1714	Renfrewshire	Inverclyde		464	15,608
Port of Menteith		Perthshire	Stirling		7,176	693
Portmoak		Kinross-shire	Perth and Kinross	Kirkness	3,725	1,272
Portpatrick	1628	Wigtownshire	Dumfries and Galloway		4,504	900
Portree	1726	Inverness-shire	Highland	Created from parts of Snizort and Kilmuir parishes 1726. Contains area of ancient parish of Kilmaluoc (aka Raasay).	24,315	2,969
Premnay		Aberdeenshire	Aberdeenshire		2,283	1,100
Prestonkirk		Haddingtonshire	East Lothian	Linton or East Linton	4,089	2,402
Prestonpans	1605	Haddingtonshire	East Lothian		205	9,303
Rafford		Morayshire	Moray	Absorbed ancient parish of Altyre.	4,277	1,599
Rathen		Aberdeenshire	Aberdeenshire		4,818	2,436
Ratho		Midlothian	City of Edinburgh		2,009	2,460
Rathven		Banffshire	Moray		9,995	12,946
Rattray		Perthshire	Perth and Kinross		2,919	3,279
Rayne		Aberdeenshire	Aberdeenshire		3,106	940
Reay		Caithness Sutherland	Highland		18,452	694
Redgorton		Perthshire	Perth and Kinross		1,762	3,060
Renfrew		Renfrewshire	Glasgow City; Renfrewshire		2,495	47,201
Rerrick		Kirkcudbrightshire	Dumfries and Galloway	Dundrennan	8,017	692
Rescobie		Forfarshire	Angus		2,507	286
Resolis	1762	Ross and Cromarty	Highland		5,889	911
Rhu	1643	Dunbartonshire	Argyll and Bute		8,503	16,781
Rhynd		Perthshire	Perth and Kinross		617	110
Rhynie		Aberdeenshire	Aberdeenshire		4,851	560
Riccarton		Ayrshire	East Ayrshire		3,682	15,993
Roberton	1682	Roxburghshire	Scottish Borders	Partly in Selkirkshire until 1891. Received part of the defunct parish of Hassendean, 17th century.	11,955	199
Rogart		Sutherland	Highland		37,503	458
Rosemarkie		Ross and Cromarty	Highland		3,059	2,407
Rosneath		Dunbartonshire	Argyll and Bute		3,450	3,221
Rosskeen		Ross and Cromarty	Highland	Absorbed ancient parish of Nonakiln	16,446	7,894
Rothes		Banffshire Morayshire	Moray	Absorbed part of Dundurcas in 1783	6,959	1,446
Rothesay		Bute	Argyll and Bute		270	5,377
Rothiemay		Aberdeenshire Banffshire	Moray		4,434	635
Rousay and Egilsay	c1560	Orkney	Orkney	Rousay	5,702	271
Roxburgh		Roxburghshire	Scottish Borders		2,833	512
Rutherglen		Lanarkshire	Glasgow City; South Lanarkshire		825	28,098
Ruthven		Forfarshire	Angus		1,171	151
Ruthwell		Dumfriesshire	Dumfries and Galloway		2,760	488
Saddell and Skipness	1753	Argyllshire	Argyll and Bute		20,899	663
Saline		Fife	Fife		4,761	1,762
Saltoun		Haddingtonshire	East Lothian		884	406
Sandsting	Medieval	Zetland	Shetland		18,708	1,152
Sandwick		Orkney	Orkney		5,382	835
Sanquhar		Dumfriesshire	Dumfries and Galloway		15,833	2,449
Scone		Perthshire	Perth and Kinross		2,952	5,208
Scoonie		Fife	Fife		3,042	9,613
Selkirk		Roxburghshire Selkirkshire	Scottish Borders		12,223	6,401
Shapinsay		Orkney	Orkney		2,783	307
Shotts	1476	Lanarkshire	North Lanarkshire; West Lothian		13,593	14,864
Skene		Aberdeenshire	Aberdeenshire		4,912	12,208
Skirling		Peeblesshire	Scottish Borders		768	194
Slains		Aberdeenshire	Aberdeenshire		3,645	472
Slamannan	Medieval	Stirlingshire	Falkirk	St Laurence	3,190	2,403
Sleat	1726	Inverness-shire	Highland		17,186	913
Smailholm		Roxburghshire	Scottish Borders		1,547	119
Small Isles	1720	Argyllshire	Highland		15,586	153
Snizort		Inverness-shire	Highland		20,981	1,350
Sorbie		Wigtownshire	Dumfries & Galloway		2,798	557
Sorn	1692	Ayrshire	East Ayrshire	Dalgain	7,321	3,006
South Knapdale	1734	Argyllshire	Argyll and Bute		28,109	2,345
South Ronaldsay	c1560	Orkney	Orkney		6,147	1,318
South Uist	c1560	Inverness-shire	Na h-Eileanan Siar		39,701	3,227
Southdean		Roxburghshire	Scottish Borders		9,562	294
Southend		Argyllshire	Argyll and Bute	Kilcholumkill	13,357	408
Speymouth	1731	Morayshire	Moray		2,839	1,370
Spott		Haddingtonshire	East Lothian; Scottish Borders		1,092	194
Sprouston		Roxburghshire	Scottish Borders		3,142	382
Spynie		Morayshire	Moray		3,595	6,704
St Andrews and Deerness	c1560	Orkney	Orkney		5,637	1,007
St Andrews and St Leonards	1895	Fife	Fife		4,776	18,421
St Andrews-Lhanbryd	1782	Morayshire	Moray	St Andrews aka Kilmalemnock	4,264	8,938
St Boswells		Roxburghshire	Scottish Borders	Lessudden (-1652)	1,573	1,729
St Cyrus		Kincardineshire	Aberdeenshire; Angus	Ecclesgreig	3,616	1,573
St Fergus		Aberdeenshire Banffshire	Aberdeenshire	Longley, Inverugie	4,362	1,118
St Madoes		Perthshire	Perth and Kinross		476	1,281
St Martins		Perthshire	Perth and Kinross	Megginch	3,385	946
St Monans		Fife	Fife	Abercrombie	804	1,357
St Mungo		Dumfriesshire	Dumfries and Galloway	Abermilk or Castlemilk	2,232	271
St Ninians		Stirlingshire	Stirling	Eccles or Kirkton	14,891	26,917
Stair	1673	Ayrshire	East Ayrshire		2,201	314
Stenness	1878	Orkney	Orkney		5,408	502
Stenton		Haddingtonshire	East Lothian; Scottish Borders	Pitcox, Pitcoks	3,482	405
Stevenston		Ayrshire	North Ayrshire		925	11,423
Stewarton		Ayrshire	East Ayrshire		5,981	7,815
Stichill		Roxburghshire	Scottish Borders	Absorbed the parish of Hume (which was formerly in Berwickshire) in 1640.	805	203
Stirling		Clackmannanshire Stirlingshire	Stirling		551	17,050
Stobo		Peeblesshire	Scottish Borders		4,332	183
Stonehouse		Lanarkshire	South Lanarkshire		1,903	5,883
Stoneykirk		Wigtownshire	Dumfries and Galloway	Steeniekirk	9,152	1,179
Stornoway		Ross and Cromarty	Na h-Eileanan Siar	Created C16th? from ancient parish of Eye, which it replaced, and part of Nessparish.	26,689	13,009
Stow		Midlothian Selkirkshire	Scottish Borders	Wedale. Split between Midlothian and Selkirkshire until 1898, when Selkirkshire portion became new parish of Caddonfoot.	9,189	1,207
Stracathro		Forfarshire	Aberdeenshire; Angus		2,839	299
Strachan		Kincardineshire	Aberdeenshire		15,616	544
Strachur		Argyllshire	Argyll and Bute	Kilmaglass or Kilmaglash. Ancient parish, but re-created from parts of Dunoon, Lochgoilhead and Inverchaolain in 1650.	7,373	606
Straiton		Ayrshire	East Ayrshire; South Ayrshire		23,822	2,171
Stranraer	1600	Wigtownshire	Dumfries & Galloway		31	561
Strath	1726	Inverness-shire	Highland	Kilchrist	28,567	1,869
Strathblane		Stirlingshire	Stirling		3,744	2,342
Strathdon		Aberdeenshire	Aberdeenshire	Invernochty	20,160	410
Strathlachlan		Argyllshire	Argyll and Bute	AKA Kilmorrie. Ancient parish, but re-created from parts of Dunoon, Lochgoilhead and Inverchaolain in 1650.	5,434	146
Strathmiglo		Fife	Fife		3,256	1,274
Strichen	1627	Aberdeenshire	Aberdeenshire		6,873	1,621
Stromness	1832	Orkney	Orkney		2,860	2,286
Stronsay		Orkney	Orkney	Union of ancient parishes of Stronsay Lady, Stronsay St Nicholas, and Stronsay St Peter's.	3,618	353
Swinton		Berwickshire	Scottish Borders		4,066	578
Symington		Ayrshire	South Ayrshire		2,479	1,642
Symington		Lanarkshire	South Lanarkshire		628	800
Tain		Ross and Cromarty	Highland		7,464	4,369
Tannadice		Forfarshire	Angus		12,808	522
Tarbat		Ross and Cromarty	Highland		3,442	870
Tarbolton		Ayrshire	South Ayrshire		5,066	5,675
Tarland		Aberdeenshire	Aberdeenshire		3,974	1,009
Tarves		Aberdeenshire	Aberdeenshire		7,413	2,354
Tealing		Forfarshire	Angus		1,646	622
Temple		Midlothian	Midlothian	Balantrodach	5,377	225
Terregles		Kirkcudbrightshire	Dumfries and Galloway		1,860	7,354
Teviothead	1850	Roxburghshire	Scottish Borders		12,988	146
Thurso		Caithness	Highland		10,871	9,112
Tibbermore		Perthshire	Perth and Kinross		2,635	26,564
Tillicoultry	1632	Clackmannanshire	Clackmannanshire		3,915	6,129
Tingwall		Zetland	Shetland		12,437	3,058
Tinwald		Dumfriesshire	Dumfries and Galloway		4,374	588
Tiree		Argyllshire	Argyll and Bute	Ancient parishes of Kirkapol and Soroby united with Coll to form Coll & Tiree in 1618; Coll separated out in 1866.	7,918	653
Tongland		Kirkcudbrightshire	Dumfries and Galloway	Absorbed ancient parish of Balnacross or Barncross.	4,854	454
Tongue	1726	Sutherland	Highland		54,335	564
Torosay		Argyllshire	Argyll and Bute	AKA Killean or Killean-in-Torosay. At Reformation became part of single parish of Mull, then Ross; Ross split into this parish and Kilfinichen & Kilvickeon in 1728.	24,537	645
Torphichen		Linlithgowshire	West Lothian		3,564	3,247
Torryburn		Fife	Fife		2,091	1,587
Torthorwald		Dumfriesshire	Dumfries and Galloway		3,159	1,208
Tough		Aberdeenshire	Aberdeenshire		2,307	334
Towie		Aberdeenshire	Aberdeenshire	AKA Kilbathock.	4,931	126
Tranent		Haddingtonshire	East Lothian		2,468	18,073
Traquair		Peeblesshire	Scottish Borders	AKA Kirkbride. Received part of Kailzie upon its suppression in 1674.	6,928	1,187
Trinity Gask		Perthshire	Perth and Kinross		3,277	291
Troqueer		Kirkcudbrightshire	Dumfries and Galloway		3,240	11,659
Tulliallan		Perthshire	Fife		2,193	3,001
Tullynessle and Forbes	1808	Aberdeenshire	Aberdeenshire		4,049	653
Tundergarth		Dumfriesshire	Dumfries and Galloway		1,604	141
Turriff		Aberdeenshire	Aberdeenshire		6,593	6,306
Tweedsmuir	1643	Peeblesshire	Scottish Borders		13,000	114
Twynholm		Kirkcudbrightshire	Dumfries and Galloway		4,664	1,084
Tynron		Dumfriesshire	Dumfries and Galloway		5,678	135
Tyrie		Aberdeenshire	Aberdeenshire		1,928	1,367
Udny	1597	Aberdeenshire	Aberdeenshire		4,237	2,407
Uig	Med/1722	Ross and Cromarty	Na h-Eileanan Siar		55,752	1,595
Unst	C16th	Zetland	Shetland		12,260	632
Uphall		Linlithgowshire	West Lothian	Strathbrock	1,948	18,463
Urquhart		Morayshire	Moray		5,027	1,650
Urquhart and Glenmoriston	1600	Inverness-shire	Highland		52,716	2,386
Urquhart and Logie Wester	C15th	Nairnshire Ross & Cromarty	Highland	Logie Wester AKA Logie Bride.	5,023	3,678
Urr		Kirkcudbrightshire	Dumfries and Galloway	Colmonell (-C13th), Kirkconstantine	5,098	5,330
Urray		Inverness-shireRoss & Cromarty	Highland	Absorbed old parish of Kilchrist (or Tarradale) 1574.	14,741	3,920
Walls and Flotta	c1560	Orkney	Orkney		3,922	454
Walls and Sandness	C16th	Zetland	Shetland		7,055	619
Walston		Lanarkshire	South Lanarkshire		6,610	290
Wamphray		Dumfriesshire	Dumfries and Galloway		4,034	220
Watten		Caithness	Highland	Created from part of Bower parish in 1638.	14,182	749
Weem		Perthshire	Perth and Kinross		2,694	104
Wemyss		Fife	Fife		986	18,255
West Calder	1646	Midlothian	West Lothian		7,225	8,440
West Kilbride		Ayrshire	North Ayrshire		5,847	5,699
West Linton		Peeblesshire	Scottish Borders	Linton	8,958	2,433
Westerkirk		Dumfriesshire	Dumfries and Galloway		10,375	169
Westray		Orkney	Orkney	Union of the two ancient parishes of Westray Crosskirk and Westray Ladykirk.	4,756	588
Westruther	Medieval	Berwickshire	Scottish Borders	Bassendean (-1649)	5,742	393
Whitburn	1731	Linlithgowshire	West Lothian		4,339	20,968
Whitekirk and Tyninghame	1760	Haddingtonshire	East Lothian	Union of ancient parishes of Auldhame, Tyninghame and Whitekirk.	2,966	512
Whithorn		Wigtownshire	Dumfries and Galloway		3,688	1,311
Whitsome		Berwickshire	Scottish Borders		194	98
Whittingehame		Haddingtonshire	East Lothian		1,424	186
Wick		Caithness	Highland		19,262	9,255
Wigtown		Wigtownshire	Dumfries and Galloway		3,424	1,168
Wiston and Roberton	1772	Lanarkshire	South Lanarkshire		4,158	324
Yarrow		Selkirkshire	Scottish Borders	Received the Megget area of Lyne & Megget, 1891. Union of ancient parishes of Duchoire, St Mary's and Kirkhope; Kirkhope independent 1852.	21,117	281
Yell		Zetland	Shetland		21,611	966
Yester		Haddingtonshire	East Lothian	Bothans	7,992	1,179
Yetholm		Roxburghshire	Scottish Borders		2,686	668

There were in addition the parishes of Berwick-upon-Tweed, and Bondington (with two churches, St Laurence, and St Mary's). These were part of Scotland and the historic county of Berwickshire, but were captured by England from 1482 onwards.

== Former parishes ==
Former parish	Dates	Successor parish(es)
Abbotrule	Medieval-1777	Hobkirk/Southdean
Abbotshall	1650-1901	Kirkcaldy & Dysart
Aberdeen St Nicholas or New Ab.	Medieval-?	Aberdeen
Aberdeen Snow	1497?-1499	Aberdeen St Machar's, Aberdeen
Aberdeen Spittal	1427-1560?	Aberdeen St Machar's, Aberdeen
Abernethy (Strathspey)	Medieval-1593	Abernethy & Kincardine
Abertarff	Medieval-1614	Boleskine & Abertarff
Aberuthven	Medieval-1605	Auchterarder
Aboyne	Medieval-1600	Aboyne & Glentanar
Advie	Medieval-c1550	Cromdale, Inverallan & Advie
Aithsting	Medieval-c1560	Sandsting
Alloway	Medieval-1690	Ayr
Altyre	Medieval-1601	Dallas (1601-57), Rafford (1657-)
Antermony	Medieval-C13th	Campsie
Arbroath	1585-1895	Arbroath & St Vigeans
Ardchattan or Balevedan	Medieval-1618	Ardchattan & Muckairn
Ardeonaig	Medieval-1617	Killin
Arisaig or Kilmolroy/Kilmorie	Medieval-1614	Ardnamurchan (1614-1895), Arisaig & Moidart (1895-)
Auchindoir	Medieval-1808	Auchindoir & Kearn
Auldbar	Medieval-1605	Aberlemno
Auldcathie	Medieval-1618	Dalmeny (1618-1891), Kirkliston (1891-)
Auldhame	Medieval-1560	Whitekirk (1560-1760), Whitekirk & Tyninghame (1760-)
Baliasta	Medieval-C16th	Unst
Ballumby	Medieval-	Murroes
Balnacross or Barncross	Medieval-1560	Tongland
Bara or Baro	Medieval-1702	Garvald & Bara
Barnweil	Medieval-1673	Craigie/Tarbolton
The Bass	1493-1581	North Berwick
Benbecula	Medieval-1560	South Uist
Benvie	Medieval-1753	Liff & Benvie
Berwick-upon-Tweed	Medieval-C15th	Berwick-upon-Tweed (England)
Binny	Medieval-1564	Linlithgow (1564-1891), Ecclesmachan (1891-)
Birsay	Medieval-1560	Birsay & Harray
Boleskine	Medieval-1614	Boleskine & Abertarff
Boleside???	Medieval-C13th	Lindean (C13th-1622), Galashiels (1622-)
Bona or Abriachan	Medieval-1618	Inverness & Bona
Bondington	Medieval-C15th	Berwick-upon-Tweed (England)
Bo'ness	1649-1895	Bo'ness & Carriden
Botarie	Medieval-1618	Botarie & Ruthven (1618-1710), Cairnie (1710-)
Bothkennar	Medieval-1900	Grangemouth/Falkirk
Brachollie or Brackley	Medieval-c1500	Petty
Braemar or Kindrochit	Medieval-1626	Crathie & Braemar
Broughton	Medieval-1794	Broughton, Glenholm & Kilbucho
Brydekirk	Medieval-C14th	Annan
Bunkle or Bonkle or Bonkyl	Medieval-1621	Bunkle & Preston
Burghill or Unthiekil	Medieval-1560	Brechin
Burness	Medieval-C16th	Cross & Burness
Burra	Medieval-C16th	Bressay (C16th-1701), Lerwick (1701-)
Burray	Medieval-C16th	South Ronaldsay
Calder Comitis	Medieval-1646	Mid Calder, West Calder
Cambuskenneth	Medieval-1560	Stirling, Logie, Alloa
Cambusmichael	Medieval-1693	St Martin's
Canna	Medieval-1560	Strath (1560-1662), Strath & Sleat (1662-1720), Small Isles (1720-)
Canongate or Holyroodhouse	Medieval-1895	Edinburgh
Carriden	Medieval-1895	Bo'ness & Carriden
Carruthers	Medieval-1609	Middlebie
Catterline	Medieval-1719	Kinneff & Catterline
Clayshant	Medieval-1618	Stoneykirk
Clerkington	Medieval-1593	Temple
Clova	1560-1618	Cortachy & Clova
Coldstone	Medieval-1618	Logie Coldstone
Colinton or Hailes	Medieval-1920	Edinburgh
Colonsay	Medieval-c1500	Jura & Colonsay (c1500-1861), Colonsay & Oronsay (1861-)
Colvend	Medieval-1612	Colvend & Southwick
Convinth	Medieval-c1500	Kiltarlity & Convinth
Corrie	Medieval-1609	Hutton & Corrie
Corstorphine	Medieval-1920	Edinburgh
Cortachy	Medieval-1618	Cortachy & Clova
Cramond	Medieval-1920	Edinburgh
Crathie	Medieval-1626	Crathie & Braemar
Crombie formerly Abercrombie	Medieval-1622	Torryburn
Cromdale	Medieval-c1550	Cromdale, Inverallan & Advie
Cross (Sanday)	Medieval-C16th	Cross & Burness
Croy	Medieval-1618	Croy & Dalcross
Cruggleton	Medieval-1633	Sorbie
Cullicudden	Medieval-1762	Resolis
Cumnock	Medieval-1691	Old Cumnock, New Cumnock
Cunningsburgh	Medieval-1600	Dunrossness
Dalarossie	Medieval-c1500	Moy & Dalarossie
Dalcross	Medieval-1618	Croy & Dalcross
Dalgarno or Dalgarnoch	Medieval-1606	Closeburn
Deer	Medieval-1622	New Deer, Old Deer
Dowally	-1627	Dunkeld & Dowally
Drumdelgie	Medieval-1618	Botarie & Ruthven (1618-1710), Cairnie (1710-)
Duddingston	Medieval-1902	Edinburgh
Dunbennan	Medieval-1567	Kinnoir & Dunbennan (1567-1725), Huntly (1725-)
Dunblane	Medieval-1900	Dunblane & Lecropt
Dunkeld	Medieval-1627	Dunkeld & Dowally
Edinburgh Castle	Medieval-1560	Canongate (1560-1895), Edinburgh (1895-)
Eigg or Kildonan	Medieval-1560	Strath (1560-1662), Strath & Sleat (1662-1720), Small Isles (1720-)
Ellem	Medieval-1712	Longformacus (1712-1891), Cranshaws (1891-)
Fair Isle	Medieval-C16th	Dunrossness
Foula	Medieval-C16th	Walls & Sandness
Garvald (Lothian)	Medieval-1702	Garvald & Bara
Glenholm	Medieval-1794	Broughton, Glenholm & Kilbucho
Glenluce	Medieval-1646	Old Luce, New Luce
Glenorchy or Dysart	Medieval-1618	Glenorchy & Inishail
Glentanar	Medieval-1600	Aboyne & Glentanar
Gogar	Medieval-1599	Corstorphine (1599-1920), Edinburgh (1920-)
Harray	Medieval-1560	Birsay & Harray
Howmore	Medieval-1560	South Uist
Hutton (Dumfriesshire)	Medieval-1609	Hutton & Corrie
Inishail	Medieval-1618	Glenorchy & Inishail
Insh or Innis Eoghain	Medieval-1580	Kingussie & Insh
Inverallan	Medieval-c1550	Cromdale, Inverallan & Advie
Inverness	Medieval-1618	Inverness & Bona
Jura and Colonsay	c1500-1861	Jura, Colonsay
Kilberry	Medieval-c1500	Kilcalmonell & Kilberry (c1500-1891), South Knapdale (1891-)
Kilblaan	Medieval-1617	Southend
Kilbucho	Medieval-1794	Broughton, Glenholm & Kilbucho
Kilcalmonell and Kilberry	c1500-1891	Kilcalmonell, South Knapdale
Kilchenzie	Medieval-1636	Killean & Kilchenzie
Kilchiaran or Kilkerran	Medieval-1617	Campbeltown
Kilchievan or Kilkevan	Medieval-1617	Southend (1617-71), Campbeltown (1671-)
Kilchuslan or Kilchousland	Medieval-1617	Campbeltown
Killarow or Kilmalrubh	Medieval-c1500	Kilchenzie (c1500-1636), Killean & Kilchenzie (1636-)
Killean	Medieval-1636	Killean & Kilchenzie
Kilmahog or Kilmachog	Medieval-1615	Callander
Kilmichael (Kintyre)	Medieval-1617	Campbeltown
Kilmorich	Medieval-C15th	Lochgoilhead & Kilmorich
Kilmuir (Brechin)	Medieval-1560	Brechin
Kilpeder or Kilpheder	Medieval-1560	South Uist
Kilravock	Medieval-C13th	Dalcross (C13th-1618), Croy & Dalcross (1618-)
Kiltarlity	Medieval-c1500	Kiltarlity & Convinth
Kincardine (Strathspey)	Medieval-1593	Abernethy & Kincardine
Kingussie	Medieval-1580	Kingussie & Insh
Kinneff	Medieval-1719	Kinneff & Catterline
Kinneil	Medieval-1669	Bo'ness (1669-1895), Bo'ness & Carriden (1895-)
Kinnoir	Medieval-1567	Kinnoir & Dunbennan (1567-1725), Huntly (1725-)
Kirkandrews	Medieval-1670	Borgue
Kirkmadrine or Eggerness	Medieval-1633	Sorbie
Kirkmichael (Ross)	Medieval-1762	Resolis
Kirkton or Cavers Parva	Medieval-1895	Cavers
Kirkwall	c1570-c1590	Kirkwall & St Ola
Knapdale	Medieval-1734	North Knapdale, South Knapdale
Laxavoe	Medieval-C16th	Delting
Lecropt	Medieval-1900	Dunblane & Lecropt
Leith	1895-1920	Edinburgh
Leny	Medieval-1615	Callander
Lenzie	Medieval-1649	Kirkintilloch, Cumbernauld
Liberton	Medieval-1920	Edinburgh
Liff	Medieval-1753	Liff & Benvie
Lochgoilhead	Medieval-C15th	Lochgoilhead & Kilmorich
Logie Mar	Medieval-1618	Logie Coldstone
Logie Wester or Logiebride	Medieval-C15th	Urquhart & Logie Wester
Lund	Medieval-C16th	Unst
Lunnasting	Medieval-C16th	Nesting
Lyne and Megget	1621-1891	Lyne, Yarrow
Megget	Medieval-1621	Lyne and Megget (1621-1891), Yarrow (1891-)
Mid Yell or Reafirth	Medieval-C16th	Yell
Minginish	Medieval-C16th	Bracadale
Monkland or Baldernoch	Medieval-1640	Old Monkland, New Monkland
Monkton	Medieval-1567	Monkton & Prestwick
Montbrey	Medieval-C14th	Boyndie
Monzie	Medieval-1891	Crieff, Logiealmond
Moorfoot or Morthwait	Medieval-1593	Temple
Moy formerly Lunan	Medieval-c1500	Moy & Dalarossie
Muckairn or Killespick-Kyril	Medieval-1618	Ardchattan & Muckairn
Nisbet	Medieval-1606	Crailing
North Leith	1606-1895	Leith (1895-1920), Edinburgh (1920-)
North Ronaldsay or Ringansay	Medieval-C16th	Cross & Burness
North Yell or Glupe	Medieval-C16th	Yell
Norwick	Medieval-C16th	Unst
Ollaberry	Medieval-C16th	Northmavine
Olnafirth	Medieval-C16th	Delting
Papa Stour	Medieval-C16th	Walls & Sandness
Pennersaughs	Medieval-1609	Middlebie
Quarff	Medieval-C16th	Bressay (C16th-1701), Lerwick (1701-)
Queensferry	1635-1895	Dalmeny
Preston	Medieval-1621	Bunkle & Preston
Prestwick	Medieval-1567	Monkton & Prestwick
Ruthven	Medieval-1618	Botarie & Ruthven (1618-1710) / Cairnie (1710-)
Sandness	Medieval-C16th	Walls & Sandness
Sandwick (Shetland)	Medieval-1600	Dunrossness
Scalloway	Medieval-C16th	Tingwall
Senwick or Sandwick	Medieval-1670	Borgue
South Leith frm'ly Restalrig (-1609)	Medieval-1895	Leith (1895-1920), Edinburgh (1920-)
St Cuthbert's	Medieval-1895	Edinburgh
St Mary's	Medieval-C16th	South Ronaldsay
St Ola	Medieval-c1590	Kirkwall & St Ola
St Peter's	Medieval-C16th	South Ronaldsay
St Quivox or Sanchar	Medieval-	Ayr
St Vigeans	Medieval-1895	Arbroath & St Vigeans
South Yell or Hamnavoe	Medieval-C16th	Yell
Southwick	Medieval-1612	Colvend & Southwick
Thankerton	Medieval-1650	Covington
Toskertoun or Kirkmadryne	Medieval-1618	Stoneykirk
Urquhart (Black Isle)	Medieval-C15th	Urquhart & Logie Wester
Walls (Shetland)	Medieval-C16th	Walls & Sandness
Weisdale	Medieval-C16th	Tingwall
Whalsay	Medieval-C16th	Nesting
Whiteness	Medieval-C16th	Tingwall

== Parishes of doubtful status ==
- Roslin
- Spittal (Crailing), probably never a separate parish

== Timeline of disjunctions ==
Parish	Dates	Disjoined from
Dalkeith	1467	Lasswade
Glenbuchat	1470	Logie Mar
Shotts	1476	Bothwell
Cargill	1514	Coupar Angus
Alloa	c1560	Clackmannan
Cockburnspath	c1560	Oldhamstocks, Abbey St Bathans, Coldingham
Orwell	1567	Kinross
Arbroath	1585	St Vigeans
Greenock	1594	Inverkip
Udny	1597	Ellon, Logie Buchan, Tarves and Foveran
Stranraer	1600	Inch, Leswalt
Denny	1601	Falkirk
Prestonpans	1605	Tranent
North Leith	1606	Canongate
Ferryport on Craig	1606	Leuchars
Carmylie	1609	Panbride, St Vigeans, Inverkeilor
New Machar or Monykebuck	1609	Aberdeen St Machar's
Eyemouth	1618	Coldingham
Bervie or Inverbervie	1618	Kinneff
Grange	1618	Keith
Wester Ugie, later Longside	1620	Peterhead
Newburgh	1622	Abdie
Ordiquhill	1622	Fordyce
Strichen	1627	Rathen, Fraserburgh
Portpatrick	1628	Inch
Kingsbarns	1631	Crail
Muirkirk	1631	Mauchline
Keir	1632	Holywood
Pitsligo	1633	Aberdour (Aberdeenshire)
Pittenweem	1633	Anstruther Wester
Queensferry	1635	Dalmeny
Carsphairn	1640	Dalry, Kells
Fearn	1640	Tarbat
Careston	1641	Brechin
Anstruther Easter	1641	Kilrenny
Fenwick	1641	Kilmarnock
Elie	1641	Kilconquhar
Row or Rhu	1643	Rosneath
Tweedsmuir	1643	Drumelzier
Cameron	1646	St Andrews
Glencorse	1646	Lasswade
Muiravonside	1648	Falkirk
Bo'ness	1649	Kinneil
Monquhitter	1649	Turriff
Abbotshall	1650	Kinghorn, Kirkcaldy
Barr	1653	Colmonell, Dailly, Girvan
Kinloss	1657	Alves, Rafford, Forres
Arrochar	1658	Luss
Newhills or Keppelhills	1666	Aberdeen St Machar's
Stair	1673	Ochiltree
Roberton	1682	Selkirk, Wilton, Hawick, Hassendean
Gladsmuir	1691	Haddington, Aberlady, Tranent
Dalgain, later Sorn	1692	Mauchline
Lerwick	1701	Tingwall
Eskdalemuir	1703	Westerkirk
Port Glasgow	1714	Kilmacolm
Eddrachillis	1724	Lairg, Durness
Polmont, later Grangemouth	1724	Falkirk
Tongue	1726	Durness
Whitburn	1731	Livingston
Saddell and Skipness	1753	Killean, Kilcalmonell
Kilarrow and Kilmeny	1769	Kilchoman
Gorbals	1771	Govan
Newton-upon-Ayr	1779	Monkton & Prestwick
Glenshiel	1826	Kintail
Stromness	1832	Sandwick
Half Morton	1839	Langholm
North Bute	1844	Rothesay
Teviothead	1850	Cavers
Kirkhope	1851	Yarrow
Ardoch	1855	Muthill, Dunblane, Blackford

Before 1844, when quoad sacra parishes were established, this also serves as a list of changes to ecclesiastical parishes.

- Kirkennan suppressed and joined to Buittle. Polmadie suppressed and joined to Rutherglen. Tullich and Inchmarnoch suppressed and joined to Glenmuick. Dowallie created out of Caputh. Jura and Colonsay merged to form Jura and Colonsay.
- Circa 1525: (-2) Eilean Munda suppressed and joined to Lismore (thereafter? Lismore and Appin). Kilmelford suppressed and joined to Kilninver (thereafter Kilninver and Kilmelfort).
- Circa 1550: (-10) Advie and Inverallan suppressed and joined to Cromdale (thereafter Cromdale, Inverallan and Advie). Carbuddo suppressed and joined to Guthrie. Dunbeath suppressed and joined to Latheron. Knoydart suppressed and joined to Glenelg. Logie Mached suppressed and joined to Caputh. Morinnis suppressed and joined to Tain. Skinnet and Spittal suppressed and joined to Halkirk. Unthank suppressed and joined to Duffus.
- 1560 or thereabouts: () Aberdeen Spittal suppressed. Auldhame suppressed and joined to Hamer, thereafter Whitekirk. Balnacross suppressed and joined to Tongland. Benbecula and Kilpheder suppressed and joined to Howmore (thereafter South Uist). Birsay suppressed and joined to Harray (thereafter Birsay and Harray). Burness and Ringansay suppressed and joined to Cross (thereafter Cross and Burness). Burray and St Mary's suppressed and joined to St Peter's (South Ronaldsay). Canna and Eigg suppressed and joined to Strath. Cross (Westray) suppressed and joined to Lady (Westray) (thereafter Westray). Culbin and Moy suppressed and joined to Dyke (thereafter Dyke and Moy). Dalgarven suppressed and joined to Kilwinning. Deerness suppressed and joined to St Andrews (Orkney). Eday, Stronsay St Peter's and Stronsay St Nicholas suppressed and joined to Stronsay St Mary's (thereafter Stronsay and Eday). Edinburgh Castle suppressed and joined to Canongate. Egilsay suppressed and joined to Rousay. Ewes Durris suppressed and joined to Ewes. Eye, Gress, Lochs and Uig suppressed and joined to Stornoway. Flotta suppressed and joined to Walls (Orkney). Gigha suppressed and joined to Jura (instead joined to Saddell from 1641; instead joined to Killean from 1659). Graemsay suppressed and joined to Hoy (thereafter Hoy and Graemsay). Kelimore (Kilmuir?) and Burghill suppressed and joined to Brechin. Kilblane suppressed and joined to Kirkmahoe. Kirkconnel suppressed and joined to Troqueer. Lempitlaw suppressed and joined to Sprouston. Maxwell and Roxburgh St James suppressed and joined to Kelso. Ness suppressed and joined to Barvas. Newton Don suppressed and joined to Nenthorn. Nonekill or Nonakiln suppressed and joined to Rosskeen. Raasay, Snizort and Uig suppressed and joined to Kiltarlagain (thereafter Kiltarlagain, Raasay, Snizort and Uig). Rendall suppressed and joined to Evie. Rutherford suppressed and joined to Maxton. Sand suppressed and joined to Kilmorie (thereafter North Uist). Stenness suppressed and joined to Firth. Stenscholl or Kilmartin suppressed and joined to Kilmaluag (later Kilmuir). Strafontain suppressed and joined to Abbey St Bathans. Strathgarve suppressed and joined to Contin. Strathlachlan suppressed and joined to Inverchaolain (instead joined to Strachur from 1651). Stromness suppressed and joined to Sandwick. Manor created out of Peebles. Cambuskenneth suppressed and divided between Stirling, Logie and Alloa. Clova created out of Glamis.
- 1564: (-2) Moonzie suppressed and joined to Cupar.
- Circa 1570: (-2) Dundurn and Tullichetil suppressed and joined to Comrie. Methil suppressed and joined to Wemyss.
- 1571: (-1) Kirkbride suppressed and joined to Maybole.
- 1572: (-1) Laggan suppressed and joined to Alvie.
- 1573: (-1) Forvie suppressed and joined to Slains.
- 1580: (-3) Seton suppressed and joined to Tranent. Kirk of Muir or Sauchinford suppressed.
- 1581: (-2) The Bass suppressed and joined to North Berwick. Tillicoultry suppressed and joined to Alva.
- 1583: (-2) Melville suppressed and joined to Newbattle, later divided between Lasswade and Dalkeith. Ecclesjohn suppressed and joined to Dun.
- 1584: (-2) Kilbride suppressed and joined to Dunblane. Woomet suppressed and joined to Newton.
- 1585: (-2) Glenlyon and Kilchonain in Rannoch suppressed and joined to Fortingall. Ethie suppressed and joined to Inverkeilor.
- 1589: (-1) Torrens suppressed and joined to East Kilbride.
- 1590: (-4) East Calder suppressed and joined to Mid Calder. Kilmahew suppressed and joined to Cardross. Strowan suppressed and joined to Monzievaird (thereafter Monzievaird and Strowan).
- 1599: (-2) Gogar suppressed and joined to Corstorphine. Fetterneir suppressed and joined to Chapel of Garioch.
- 1600: (-11) Glenmoriston suppressed and joined to Urquhart. Glentanar suppressed and joined to Aboyne (thereafter Aboyne and Glentanar). Horndean suppressed and joined to Ladykirk. Kilmaveonaig, Lude and Struan suppressed and joined to Blair Atholl. Kinettas and Glen Ussie suppressed and joined to Fodderty. Nevay suppressed and joined to Eassie (thereafter Eassie and Nevay). Saulseat suppressed and joined to Inch. Tarradale suppressed and joined to Urray. Tullibody suppressed and joined to Alloa.
- 1601: Altyre suppressed and joined to Dallas (later Rafford).
- 1604: (-3) Belkirk, Ettiltoun and Wheelkirk suppressed and joined to Castleton.
- 1605: (-3) Aberuthven suppressed and joined to Auchterarder. Auldbar suppressed and joined to Aberlemno. Restennet suppressed and joined to Forfar.
- 1606: (0) Dalgarno suppressed and joined to Closeburn. Nisbet suppressed and joined to Crailing.
- 1608: (-1) Wandel suppressed and joined to Lamington (thereafter Lamington and Wandel).
- 1609: (-10) Carruthers and Pennersaughs suppressed and joined to Middlebie. Corrie suppressed and joined to Hutton (thereafter Hutton and Corrie). Ecclefechan and Luce suppressed and joined to Hoddam. Irving(?) and Kirkconnel suppressed and joined to Kirkpatrick Fleming. Little Dalton suppressed and joined to Meikle Dalton, thereasfter Dalton. Rinpatrick suppressed and joined to Gretna. St Leonards suppressed and joined to Lanark. Sibbaldbie suppressed and joined to Applegarth. Trailtrow suppressed and joined to Cummertrees.
- 1610: (-3) Aldcambus suppressed and joined to Cockburnspath. Fincastle suppressed and joined to Dull. Lamberton suppressed and joined to Ayton (later instead to Mordington).
- 1612: (-4) Essie suppressed and joined to Rhynie. Meathie suppressed and joined to Inverarity. Pert suppressed and joined to Logie Montrose (thereafter Logie Pert). Southwick suppressed and joined to Colvend (thereafter Colvend and Southwick).
- 1613: (-2) Logie and Invergowrie suppressed and joined to Liff.
- 1614: (-9) Abertarff suppressed and joined to Boleskine (thereafter Boleskine and Abertarff). Eilean Finain and Arisaig (aka Kilmolroy or Kilmorie) suppressed and joined to Ardnamurchan. Fishwick suppressed and joined to Hutton. Gelston and Kirkcormick suppressed and joined to Kelton. Luncarty and Pitcairn suppressed and joined to Redgorton. Tullibole suppressed and joined to Fossoway.
- 1615: (-2) Kilmachog and Leny suppressed and joined to Callander.
- Early 17th century: (-2) Glengairn suppressed and joined to Glenmuick (thereafter Glenmuick, Tullich and Glengairn). Migvie suppressed and joined to Tarland.
- 1617: (-7) Ardeonaig and Strathfillan suppressed and joined to Killin. Dunipace suppressed and joined to Larbert. Kilchuslan and Kilmichael suppressed and joined to Kilchiaran (which named Campbeltown from 1700). Kilblaan and Kilchievan suppressed and joined to Kilcholumkill (Kilchievan instead joined to Kilchiaran from 1671) (Kilcholumkill later known as Southend).
- 1618: (-31) Auldcathie suppressed and joined to Dalmeny. Bona suppressed and joined to Inverness (thereafter Inverness and Bona). Clayshant and Toskertoun suppressed and joined to Stoneykirk. Clova suppressed and joined to Cortachy (thereafter Cortachy and Clova). Coldstone suppressed and joined to Logie Mar (thereafter Logie Coldstone). Coll and Sorobie suppressed and joined to Kirkapol, thereafter Tiree. Dalcross suppressed and joined to Croy. Dalmeath suppressed and joined to Glass. Drumdelgie and Ruthven suppressed and joined to Botarie (thereafter Botarie and Ruthven, later Cairnie). Dunlappie suppressed and joined to Stracathro. Dunlichity suppressed and joined to Daviot. Dunninald suppressed and joined to Craig. Dupplin suppressed and joined to Aberdalgie. Farnua suppressed and joined to Wardlaw (thereafter Kirkhill). Fetterangus suppressed and joined to Deer. Fowlis Easter suppressed and joined to Lundie. Inishail suppressed and joined to Glenorchy (thereafter Glenorchy and Inishail). Kearn suppressed and joined to Forbes. Keith Marischal suppressed and joined to Keith Humbie. Kilarrow and Kilmeny suppressed and joined to Kilchoman. Kirkdale suppressed and joined to Kirkmabreck. Kirkmaiden-in-Farines suppressed and joined to Glasserton. Laggan Allochie suppressed and joined to Little Dunkeld. Lemlair suppressed and joined to Kiltearn. Lochlee suppressed and joined to Lethnot. Logiebride suppressed and joined to Auchtergaven. Muckairn suppressed and joined to Ardchattan (thereafter Ardchattan and Muckairn). Quothquan suppressed and joined to Libberton. Rosyth suppressed and joined to Inverkeithing. Soutra suppressed and joined to Fala (thereafter Fala and Soutra). Tarvit suppressed and joined to Cupar.
- 1620: (0) Rait suppressed and joined to Kilspindie.
- 1621: (-2) Megget suppressed and joined to Lyne (thereafter Lyne and Megget). Preston suppressed and joined to Bunkle (thereafter Bunkle and Preston).
- 1622: (+2) Crombie suppressed and joined to Torryburn.
- 1625: (-4) Elchies suppressed and joined to Knockando. Icholumkill and Kilvickeon suppressed and joined to Kilfinichen (thereafter Kilfinichen and Kilvickeon). Kilintach suppressed and joined to Kilcholumkill (thereafter Morvern). Rothiemurchus suppressed and joined to Duthil (thereafter Duthil and Rothiemurchus). Moonzie re-created out of Cupar.
- 1626: (-1) Braemar suppressed and joined to Crathie.
- 1627: (0) Dowallie suppressed and joined to Dunkeld (thereafter Dunkeld and Dowally).
- 1628: (-2) Inchmartin suppressed and joined to Errol. Kilmore and Ulva suppressed and joined to Kilninian (thereafter Kilninian and Kilmore).
- 1629: (-1) Haddington St Martin's suppressed and joined to Haddington St Mary's (thereafter Haddington).
- 1630: (-1) Rathmureal suppressed and joined to Kennethmont.
- 1632: (+2) Tillicoultry re-created out of Alva.
- 1633: (0) Cruggleton and Kirkmadrine suppressed and joined to Sorbie.
- 1635: (0) Mount Lothian suppressed and joined to Penicuik. Mow suppressed and joined to Morebattle.
- 1636: (-1) Kilchenzie suppressed and joined to Killean (thereafter Killean and Kilchenzie). Kilbride suppressed and joined to Kilmore near Oban (thereafter Kilmore and Kilbride). Laggan re-created out of Alvie.
- 1638: (+1) Fearn re-created out of Forbes.
- 1639: (-1) Kinkell suppressed and joined to Trinity Gask.
- 1640: (0) Hume suppressed and joined to Stichill. Mailor and Muckersie suppressed and joined to Forteviot.
- 1641: (+6) Kirkforthar suppressed and joined to Markinch. East Calder re-created out of Mid Calder.
- 1647: (-2) Pentland suppressed and joined to Lasswade. Pert and Logie Montrose united to form Logie Pert.
- 1649: (+6) Dalavich created out of Kilchrenan. New Kilpatrick created out of Kilpatrick, thereafter Old Kilpatrick. New Mauchline created out of Mauchline.
- 1650: (-5) Buccleuch suppressed and joined to Ettrick. Dungree suppressed and divided between Kirkpatrick Juxta and Johnstone. Kilchattan suppressed and joined to Kilbrandon (thereafter Kilbrandon and Kilchattan). Longcastle suppressed and joined to Kirkinner. Thankerton suppressed and joined to Covington. Trailflat suppressed and joined to Tinwald.
- 1651: (+1) Inveraray created out of Glenaray.
- 1652: (-2) Kirkpottie and Ecclesmoghridain suppressed and joined to Dron.
- 1654: (-1) Kirkchrist suppressed and joined to Twynholm.
- 1658: (0) Newdosk suppressed and joined to Edzell.
- 1661: (-1) Dalavich suppressed and joined to Kilchrenan (thereafter Kilchrenan and Dalavich).
- 1662: (-2) Garrel suppressed and divided between Kirkmichael and Johnstone. Sleat suppressed and joined to Strath (thereafter Strath and Sleat).
- 1663: (-2) Dunrod and Galtway suppressed and joined to Kirkcudbright.
- 1665: (-1) Strathdeveron suppressed and joined to Cabrach.
- 1669: (-2) Kinneil suppressed and joined to Borrowstounness. Ogston suppressed and joined to Kinedar (thereafter Drainie).
- 1670: (-4) Fortrose (aka Chanonry) suppressed and joined to Rosemarkie. Kirkandrews and Senwick suppressed and joined to Borgue. Rossie suppressed and joined to Inchture.
- 1672: (-1) Laggan suppressed and re-joined to Alvie.
- 1673: (0) Barnweil suppressed and divided between Tarbolton and Craigie.
- 1674: (-1) Kailzie suppressed and divided between Traquair, Peebles and Innerleithen.
- Circa 1675: (-1) Barra suppressed and joined to South Uist.
- 1684: (-2) Langnewton suppressed and joined to Ancrum. New Mauchline suppressed and absorbed back into Mauchline.
- 1688: (-1) Pierstoun suppressed and joined to Dreghorn.
- 1690: (-3) Alloway suppressed and joined to Ayr. Hassendean suppressed and divided between Minto and Wilton. Kilmun suppressed and joined to Dunoon (thereafter Dunoon and Kilmun).
- 1693: (-1) Cambusmichael suppressed and joined to St Martin's.
- 1702: (-3) Bara suppressed and joined to Garvald (thereafter Garvald and Bara). Morton suppressed and divided between Canonbie and Wauchope. Wauchope suppressed and joined to Staplegorton, which renamed Langholm.
- 1708: (+1) Laggan re-created out of Alvie.
- 1712: (-1) Ellem suppressed and joined to Longformacus.
- 1719: (-1) Catterline suppressed and joined to Kinneff (thereafter Kinneff and Catterline).
- 1720: (+1) Small Isles created out of Strath and Sleat.
- 1722: (+2) Lochs and Uig re-created out of Stornoway. Kearn suppressed and re-joined to Forbes (Auchindoir from 1808).
- 1723: (0) Navar suppressed and joined to Lethnot (thereafter Lethnot and Navar). Lochlee re-created out of Lethnot.
- 1726: (+5) Gigha created out of Killean. Lochcarron created. Portree created out of Kiltarlagain, Raasay, Snizort and Uig (thereafter Snizort). Sleat created out of Strath and Sleat (thereafter Strath).
- 1727: Kilbride suppressed and divided between Sanquhar and Durisdeer.
- 1731: Essil suppressed and joined to Dipple (thereafter Speymouth).
- 1733: (+1) Barra re-created out of South Uist.
- 1734: (0) Hilton suppressed and joined to Whitsome.
- 1740: (-1) Kinairney suppressed and joined to Midmar.
- 1742: (-1) Dawyck suppressed and divided between Stobo and Drumelzier.
- 1745: (-1) Inveraray suppressed and absorbed back into Glenaray.
- 1751: (-1) East Calder suppressed and joined to Kirknewton.
- 1753: (0) Benvie suppressed and joined to Liff (thereafter Liff and Benvie).
- 1754: (-1) Kinkell suppressed and joined to Keithhall (thereafter Keithhall and Kinkell).
- 1756: (-1) Suddie suppressed and joined to Kilmuir Wester (thereafter Knockbain).
- 1759: (-1) Killellan suppressed and joined to Houston (thereafter Houston and Killellan).
- 1760: (-1) Tyninghame suppressed and joined to Whitekirk (formerly Hamer) (thereafter Whitekirk and Tyninghame).
- 1761: (0) Simprin suppressed and joined to Swinton.
- 1762: (-1) Cullicudden suppressed and joined to Kirkmichael (thereafter Resolis).
- 1772: (-2) Roberton suppressed and joined to Wiston (thereafter Wiston and Roberton). Kinnaird suppressed and joined to Farnell.
- 1777: (-1) Abbotrule (aka Rule Hervey) dissolved and its land given to Hobkirk and Southdean.
- 1782: (0) Dundurcas suppressed and split between Boharm and Rothes. Lhanbryd suppressed and joined to St Andrews (thereafter St Andrews Lhanbryd).
- 1792: (-1) Strathmartine suppressed and joined to Mains (thereafter Mains and Strathmartine).
- 1794: (-2) Glenholm and Kilbucho suppressed and joined to Broughton (thereafter Broughton, Glenholm and Kilbucho).
- 1795: (-1) Cushnie suppressed and joined to Leochel (thereafter Leochel Cushnie).
- 1806: (-1) Kinloch suppressed and joined to Lethendy.
- 1808: (-1) Forbes suppressed and joined to Tullynessle (thereafter Tullynessle and Forbes).
- 1828: (+6) Aberdeen East, North, South, St Clement's and Greyfriars created out of Aberdeen St Nicholas.
- 1834: (+3) Dundee split into Dundee St Mary's, St Paul's, St John's and St Clement's.
- 1840: (+2) Stirling North created out of Stirling.
- 1840s: (+1) Dunipace re-created quoad civilia out of Larbert.
- 1847: (+1) Shettleston created quoad omnia.
- 1849: (+1) Calton created quoad omnia.
- 1850: (+2) Maryhill created quoad omnia.
- 1854: (+1) Springburn created quoad omnia out of Barony.
- 1861: (+1) Jura and Colonsay divided quoad omnia into Jura, and Colonsay and Oronsay.
- 1865: (+1) Coll created quoad omnia out of Tiree.
- 1878: (+1) Stenness created quoad omnia out of Firth and Sandwick.

Between 1844 and the 1880s:

- Eday re-created out of Stronsay and Eday (thereafter Stronsay).
- Fowlis Easter re-created out of Lundie.
- Hume and Stichill re-separated.

From the 1880s onwards:

- Aithsting absorbed into Sandsting.
- Evie and Rendall merged.
- Kilcalmonell and Kilberry becomes just Kilcalmonell (with the transfer of the Kilberry area to South Knapdale).
- 1891: (0) Logiealmond created out of Monzie, Redgorton and Little Dunkeld. Monzie merged into Crieff and Logiealmond.
- 1895: (-7) Arbroath and St Vigeans merged to form Arbroath and St Vigeans. Arisaig and Moidart created out of Ardnamurchan. Ardgour created out of Kilmallie. Bo'ness and Carriden merged to form Bo'ness and Carriden. North Leith and South Leith merged to form Leith. St Leonards and St Andrews merged to form St Andrews and St Leonards. St Quivox merged into Ayr. St Cuthbert's and Canongate (and possibly the other parishes of Edinburgh, i.e. Trinity, Old Kirk, Old Greyfriars, Tollbooth, Tron, Lady Yester's, New North, New Greyfriars, St Andrew's, St George's, St Mary's, St Stephen's, Greenside and St John's) merged into City Parish of Edinburgh. Queensferry reabsorbed into Dalmeny. Kirkton absorbed into Cavers.
- 1898: (+1) Caddonfoot created out of Stow.
- 1900: (-1) Lecropt suppressed and joined to Dunblane (thereafter Dunblane and Lecropt). Strathlachlan and Strachur separated again. Polmont renamed Grangemouth. Bothkennar abolished and split between Grangemouth and Falkirk.
- 1901: (-2) Dysart and Abbotshall suppressed and joined to Kirkcaldy (thereafter Kirkcaldy and Dysart).
- 1902: (-1) Duddingston suppressed and joined to Edinburgh.
- 1920: (-4) Colinton (formerly Hailes), Corstorphine, Leith and Liberton abolished and merged into Edinburgh along with almost all of Cramond.
- Lunnasting and Whalsay absorbed into Nesting.
- North Yell merged with Mid-and-South-Yell to form Yell.
- Quarff, Gulberwick and Burra Isles absorbed into Lerwick.
- St Andrews and Deerness merged.
- Sandwick and Cunningsburgh absorbed into Dunrossness.
- Tarland and Migvie becomes just Tarland.
- Walls and Flotta merged.
- Walls and Sandness merged.
- Whiteness and Weisdale absorbed into Tingwall.
- Wilton absorbed into Hawick.

== Modern-day statistics of historic counties ==
This is determined from the above data.

Historic (1891) county	Number of civil parishes	Current population	Area (ha)	Area (km^{2})	Pop. density (/ha)	Pop. density (/km^{2})
Aberdeenshire	83	400,998	514,953	5,150	0.779	77.87
Argyllshire	39	59,798	800,950	8,010	0.075	7.47
Ayrshire	44	367,676	292,380	2,924	1.258	125.75
Banffshire	22	46,057	164,860	1,649	0.279	27.94
Berwickshire	32	26,249	121,751	1,218	0.216	21.56
Buteshire	6	12,534	56,946	570	0.220	22.01
Caithness	10	26,486	180,265	1,803	0.147	14.69
Clackmannanshire	5	50,957	14,454	145	3.525	352.55
Dumfriesshire	43	77,160	279,020	2,790	0.277	27.65
Dunbartonshire	12	274,185	64,640	646	4.242	424.17
Fife	60	365,198	132,488	1,325	2.756	275.65
Forfarshire	53	264,258	227,531	2,275	1.161	116.14
Haddingtonshire	24	74,882	65,808	658	1.138	113.79
Inverness-shire	33	123,610	1,123,580	11,236	0.110	11.00
Kincardineshire	19	57,305	96,280	963	0.595	59.52
Kinross-shire	5	11,539	20,963	210	0.550	55.04
Kirkcudbrightshire	28	47,546	233,784	2,338	0.203	20.34
Lanarkshire	38	894,145	224,610	2,246	3.981	398.09
Linlithgowshire	12	188,757	40,659	407	4.642	464.24
Edinburghshire	21	587,779	85,067	851	6.910	690.96
Morayshire	19	67,996	124,986	1,250	0.544	54.40
Nairnshire	4	12,577	38,843	388	0.324	32.38
Orkney	21	21,349	98,979	990	0.216	21.57
Peeblesshire	14	19,187	90,055	901	0.213	21.31
Perthshire	71	155,008	643,218	6,432	0.241	24.10
Renfrewshire	17	622,050	66,199	662	9.397	939.67
Ross and Cromarty	33	77,382	840,667	8,407	0.095	9.20
Roxburghshire	30	48,639	175,282	1,753	0.277	27.75
Selkirkshire	7	18,267	69,630	696	0.262	26.23
Stirlingshire	22	233,241	122,421	1,224	1.905	190.52
Sutherland	13	12,803	505,958	5,060	0.025	2.53
Wigtownshire	17	26,618	129,816	1,298	0.205	20.50
Zetland	12	23,167	146,665	1,467	0.158	15.80

== See also ==
- List of community council areas in Scotland
- List of Church of Scotland parishes
- Local government in Scotland
