= George Auchinleck, Lord Balmanno =

Scottish politician and judge

Sir George Auchinleck, Lord Balmanno, commissioner (c.1560–c.1640) was a 16th/17th century Scottish politician, judge and Senator of the College of Justice.

== Life ==
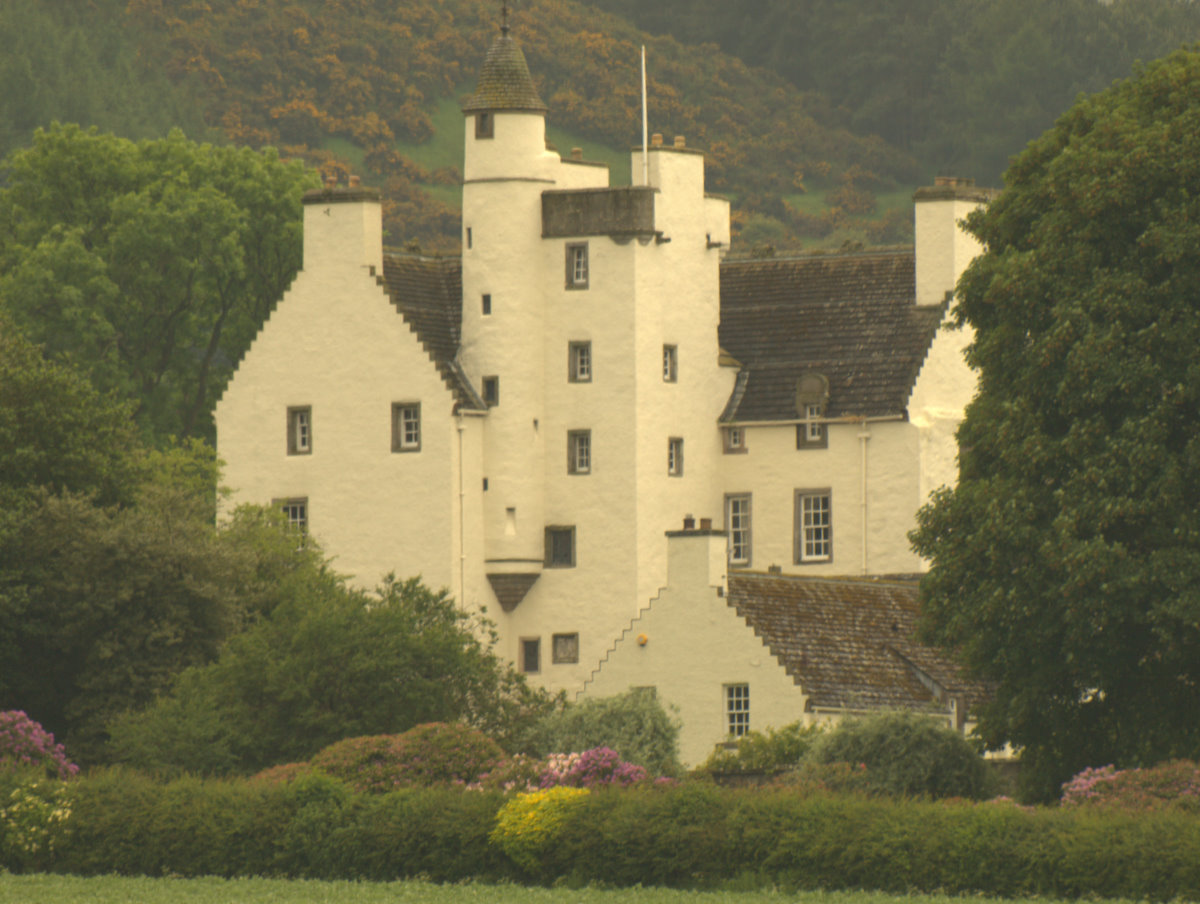
Balmanno Castle

He was the son of William Auchinleck, Laird of Balmanno Castle, son of George Auchinleck, and his wife, Elizabeth. George senior acquired the estate of Alexander Balmanno and built the castle around 1570. In 1574 he also inherited the estate of Polgony, from a childless uncle.

On the death of his father in 1596, George (as eldest son) inherited both estates.

In 1617 he sat as the Shire Commissioner representing Perthshire in the Parliament of Scotland and sat on the Committee for Revising Laws. He was admitted as an Ordinary Lord in the Scottish courts in the same year.

In February 1626 he was elected a Senator of the College of Justice (Lord of Session) in place of Viscount Lauderdale who was forced to stand down following a ban on "noblemen" in this role.

In September 1631 he was elected as a Burgess of Dundee.

He retired due to infirmity in 1638 and died prior to March 1639.

== Family ==
He married his first wife, Isabel Melville, in 1588. She died in 1593.

He secondly married Elizabeth Wemyss. They had one daughter Jean Auchinleck who married James Lockart 9th Laird of Lee and was grandmother to the courtier James Lockhart of Lee.

It is unclear if Sir William Auchinkleck (d.1648) was his younger brother or son, but William inherited the Balmanno estate. given the timescales involved Elizabeth Wemyss must have married him in 1593 or 1594 but was dead by 1597, and there was little time for two children.

In 1597 George married a third time, this time to Sarah Douglas, widow of Robert Strachan of Thornton, and daughter of William Douglas, 9th Earl of Angus. They had one daughter Margaret Auchinleck.

== Publications ==
- Practiques and Decisiones of the Lords of Session (c.1636)
