= James Bruce (farmer) =

Scottish farmer and forester (1927–2013)

- Born: James Michael Edward Bruce; 26 August 1927
- Died: 22 April 2013 (aged 85)
- Education: Eton; Royal Military College, Sandhurst; Royal Agricultural College
- Occupations: Farmer, forester
- Spouse(s): (Margaret) Jean Coats; Morven-Anne Macdonald; Mary Elizabeth Hamilton
- Children: 7
- Father: Edward Bruce, 10th Earl of Elgin

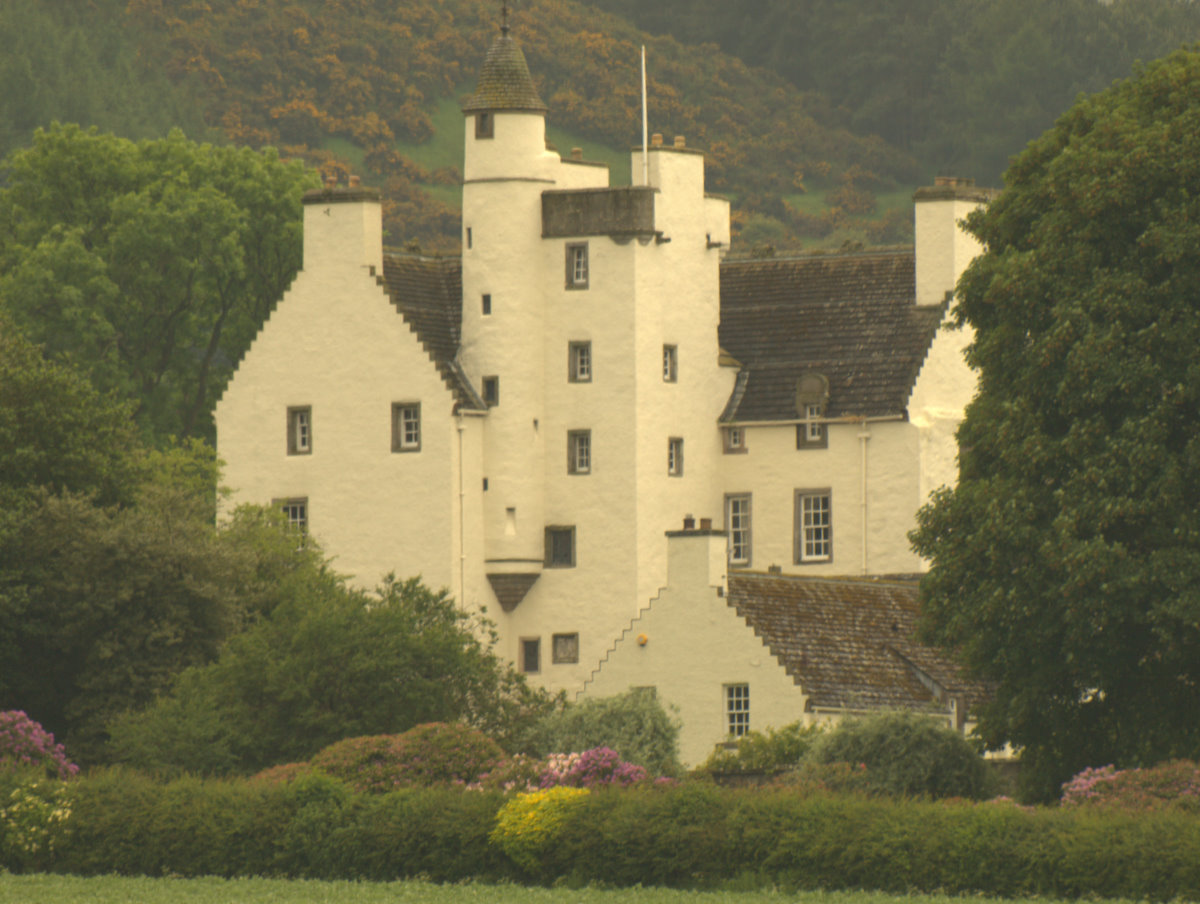
Balmanno Castle

Hon. James Michael Edward Bruce CBE JP (26 August 1927 – 22 April 2013), was a Scottish farmer, forester, and the founding chairman of Scottish Woodlands.

== Early life ==
James Bruce was born in August 1927 in Fife, the fourth child and second son of Edward Bruce, 10th Earl of Elgin. He was educated at Eton and the Royal Military College, Sandhurst, and served in the Scots Guards. He studied agriculture at the Royal Agricultural College, Cirencester, where he won the Goldstand Medal.

== Personal life ==
In 1950, Bruce married (Margaret) Jean Coats at Glen Tanar, Aboyne, the daughter of Thomas Coats, 2nd Baron Glentanar. They divorced in 1974. In 1975, he married Morven-Anne Macdonald, who died in 1994, and in 2000 married Mary Elizabeth Hamilton. He had seven children.

Bruce lived at Balmanno Castle from the 1950s.
