= Dowally =

Coordinates: 56.613186°N 3.629299°W

Dowally: Scottish Gaelic: Dubhailigh
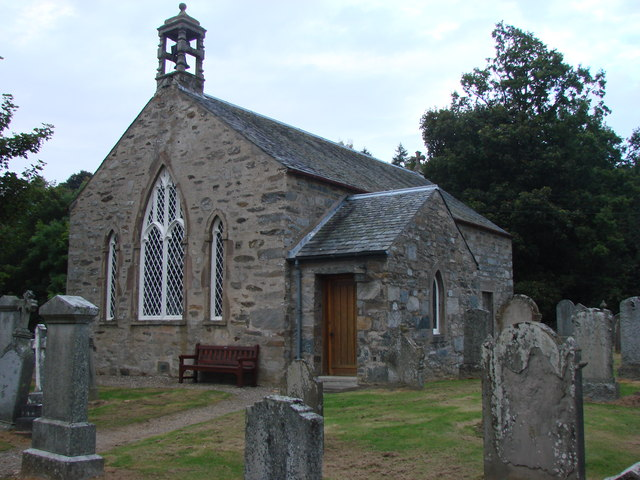
- St Anne's Church, Dowally

- Location within Perth and Kinross
- OS grid reference: NO001480
- Council area: Perth and Kinross
- Lieutenancy area: Perth and Kinross
- Country: Scotland
- Sovereign state: United Kingdom
- Post town: PITLOCHRY
- Postcode district: PH9
- Police: Scotland
- Fire: Scottish
- Ambulance: Scottish
- Scottish Parliament: North Tayside; North East Scotland

Dowally is a village and parish in Perth and Kinross, Scotland. It lies 3 1/2 miles (5.6 km) north of Dunkeld on the A9 road.

The village has a parish church dedicated to St. Anne, it was constructed in 1818 and replaced a previous church which had been constructed around 1500 but fell into ruin by 1755. In 1861 the population was 486 by 1881 this had reduced to 431.
