= Lochrutton Loch =

Lochrutton loch
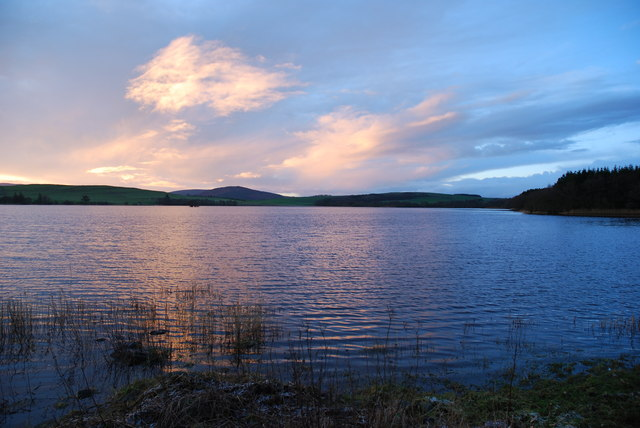

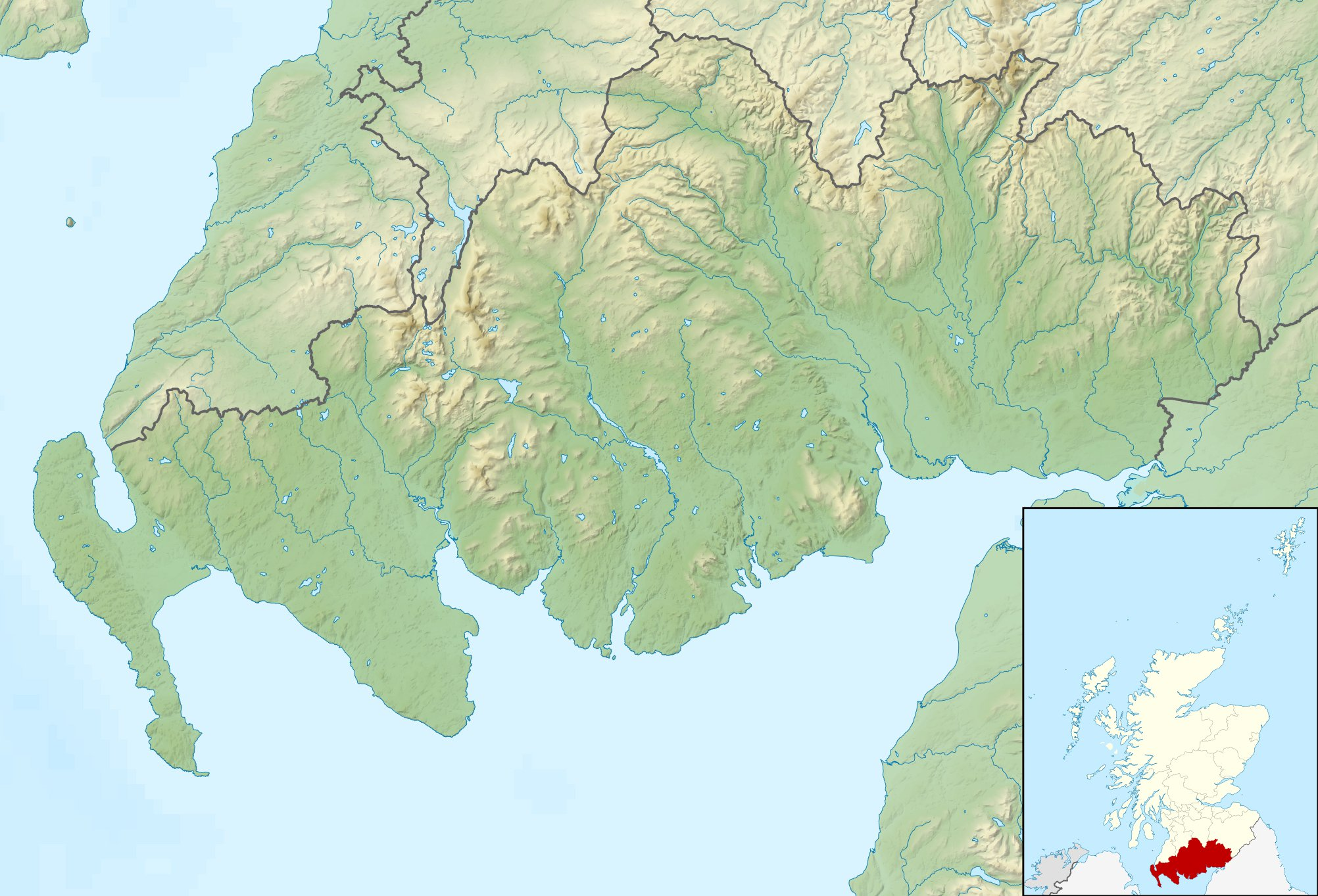
- Location within Dumfries and Galloway
- Location: Dumfries and Galloway, Scotland
- Coordinates: 55.039000°N 3.725700°W
- Type: freshwater loch
- Basin countries: Scotland
- Max. length: 0.75 mi (1.21 km)
- Max. width: 0.5 mi (0.80 km)
- Surface area: 51.4 ha (127 acres)
- Average depth: 13 ft (4.0 m)
- Max. depth: 58 ft (18 m)
- Water volume: 78,000,000 ft^{3} (2,200,000 m^{3})
- Shore length^{1}: 3.7 km (2.3 mi)
- Surface elevation: 91 m (299 ft)
- Islands: 2
- ^{1} Shore length is not a well-defined measure.

Lochrutton Loch is a large, lowland freshwater loch that lies to the west of Dumfries, Scotland. The loch trends from north to south and is 0.75 mi (1.21 km) long and 0.5 mi (0.80 km) at its widest point. It has an average depth of 13 ft (4.0 m) and is 58 ft (18 m) at its deepest. The loch was surveyed on 1 May 1905 by James Murray and L. W. Collett as part of Sir John Murray's Bathymetrical Survey of Fresh-Water Lochs of Scotland 1897-1909.

In the centre of the loch are the remains of a crannog known as Dutton's cairn. It was excavated between 1901 and 1902 and found to have a circular cairn of earth, with a diameter of approximately 80 ft (24 m). The crannog is thought to date from the Early Iron Age and was occupied until the Middle Ages. Finds from the excavation included a jet cross dating from the 13th century.

One of the areas adjacent to the loch is historically attested to have been known as 'Foot Ball Knowes' (knowe being the Scots for 'hillock'), possibly the only 'football' place name in Scotland, as early as 1815.

The loch is populated with bream, perch, pike and roach. No permit is required to fish on the loch.
