= George Auchinleck of Balmanno =

Scottish courtier and servant of Regent Morton

George Auchinleck of Balmanno (died 1596) was a Scottish courtier and servant of Regent Morton in the 1570s.

== Biography ==
Auchinleck was a nephew of the Earl of Morton. In 1566 he received a pardon for involvement in the murder of David Rizzio.

When Morton gained power as Regent of Scotland, Auchinleck is said to have become his "provisor" or chamberlain. He was in charge of the expenses of Regent Morton's household. The expenses of the Regent's household were more costly than that of the young king, James VI of Scotland, who remained at Stirling Castle in the care of Annabell Murray, Countess of Mar. He built Balmanno Castle in Perthshire.

David Hume of Godscroft writing around 1600 tells how Oliver Sinclair, an old man who had been a favourite of James V of Scotland met George Auchinleck. One day Sinclair came to Edinburgh Tolbooth and caught Auchinleck's attention, and when he came over and asked his business, all the old man said was, "I am Oliver Sinclair", then slipped away. Hume of Godscroft explains that Sinclair meant that Auchinleck would all too soon become as insignificant as he now was, and the incident was much discussed at the time.

Morton's time as Regent ended in 1579. He had given Auchinleck fishing rights on the River Don around Aberdeen. In July 1580 these were given to the royal favourite Esmé Stewart, 1st Duke of Lennox. Lennox arranged for the James VI to give this valuable source of income to the town.

Morton was arrested for treason in 1581. David Moysie says that Auchinleck was captured with Alexander Lawson and tortured with the boot, a device to crush the victim's leg, on 14 March 1581, on suspicion of involvement in murder of Lord Darnley, a plot to kidnap James VI from Doune Castle and send him England, and plans to set fire to Edinburgh. He denied these charges. David Calderwood said that "George Fleck" revealed the hiding place of some of Morton's treasure at Dalkeith Palace.

George Auchinleck was said to have confessed that Morton had the Earl of Atholl poisoned, blaming another prisoner, Sanders Jordan or Jardine.

Auchinleck was at Huntingtower Castle when James VI was seized at the Raid of Ruthven. It was said he prevented the Earl of Gowrie from killing James Stewart, Earl of Arran.

His first wife was Elizabeth Auchinleck, he married secondly in 1593, Jean Erskine, a daughter of Alexander Erskine of Gogar.

He died on 3 November 1596 at Balmanno.
