= Dron, Perth and Kinross =

Coordinates: 56.32750°N 3.39160°W

Dron
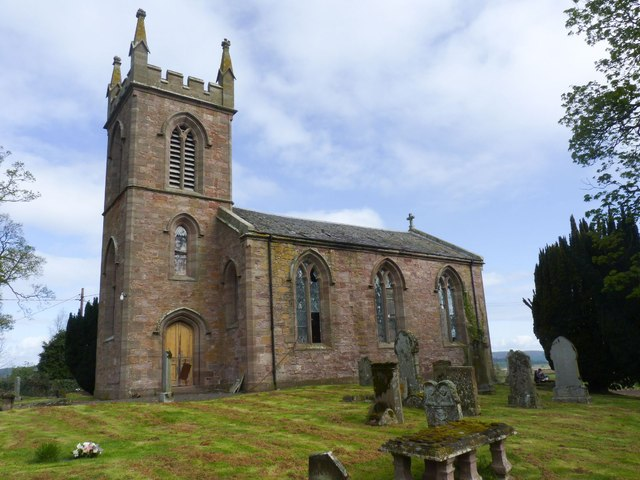
- Dron parish church

- Location within Perth and Kinross
- OS grid reference: NO140158
- Council area: Perth and Kinross
- Lieutenancy area: Perth and Kinross
- Country: Scotland
- Sovereign state: United Kingdom
- Post town: PERTH
- Postcode district: PH2 9xx
- Dialling code: 01738
- Police: Scotland
- Fire: Scottish
- Ambulance: Scottish
- UK Parliament: Perth and Kinross-shire
- Scottish Parliament: Perthshire South and Kinross-shire

Dron is a small settlement, often described as a hamlet, and civil parish in Perthshire, in the east central Lowlands of Scotland.

It is close to the villages of Abernethy, Bridge of Earn and Glenfarg, with the M90 motorway running to the west.

Dron is served by the Earn community council.

== Landmarks ==
- Balmanno Castle
