= Balmanno Castle =

Moated tower house in Dron, Perth and Kinross, Scotland

- United Kingdom
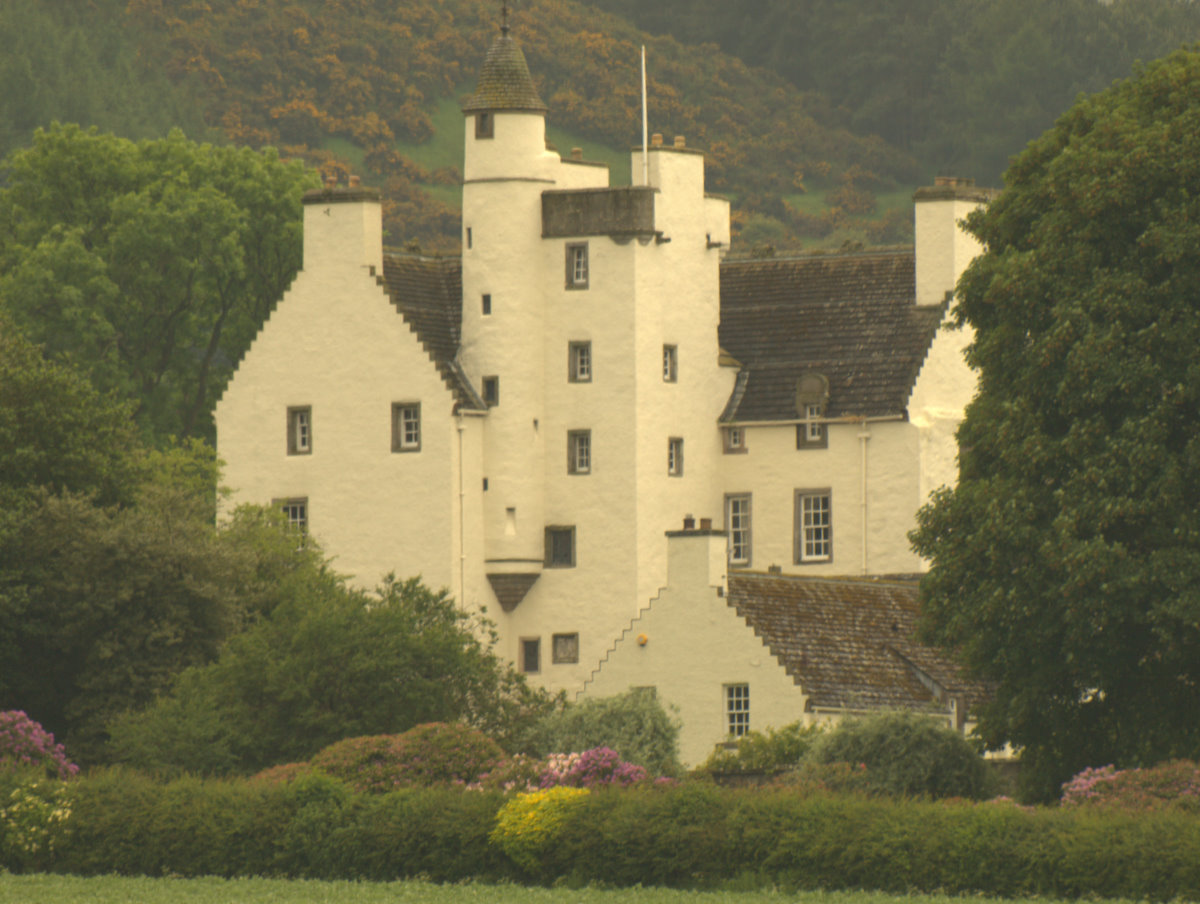
- Balmanno Castle

Site information
- Condition: Good

Location
- Coordinates: 56.3247°N 3.3850°W

Site history
- Built: between 1570 and 1580
- Materials: Stone

Designations

Inventory of Gardens and Designed Landscapes in Scotland
- Official name: Balmanno
- Designated: 30 June 1987
- Reference no.: GDL00044

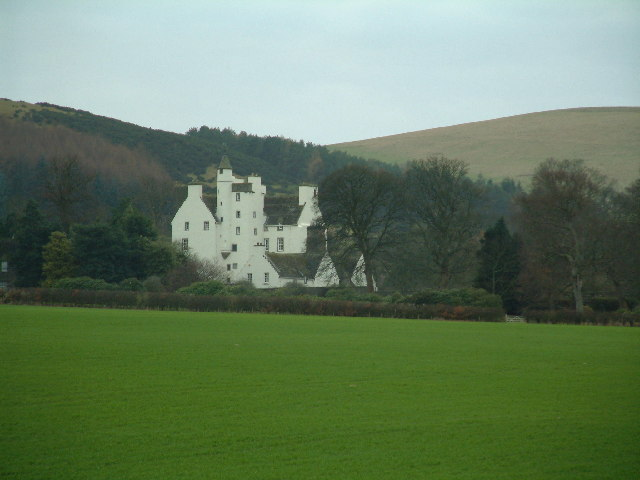

Balmanno Castle is a moated tower house located in Dron, Perth and Kinross. It was built between 1570 and 1580. It is now modernised and is in good condition. The moat is still partially filled with water. It was built for George Auchinleck, after he had acquired the estate. The house is a Category A listed building and the grounds are included in the Inventory of Gardens and Designed Landscapes in Scotland.

== History ==
The castle was built as an L-plan tower house in c.1570 for George Auchinleck.

The celebrated Scots architect Sir Robert Lorimer undertook a major restoration in 1915 for William Millar, a Glasgow ship-owner, as his summer residence. Lorimer's work was of immense quality and undertaken with great care. Externally he added extra wings to form a courtyard. Lorimer allowed himself to dabble in the Gothic, while incorporating internal details from Holyrood Palace whose restoration was the work of Sir William Bruce (1630 - 1710). Lorimer also furnished the house in every detail, using items he had commissioned as well as commercial pieces purchased around the country. He added a courtyard and expensive furniture to the house. Balmanno was sold after the second world war. Hon. James Michael Edward Bruce CBE and his wife, Jean Coats, lived in this house from the 1950s; their family continue to live in this house.

== See also ==
- List of Category A listed buildings in Perth and Kinross
