= Drummuir Curlers' Platform railway station =

Heritage railway station in Scotland

Drummuir Curlers' Platform
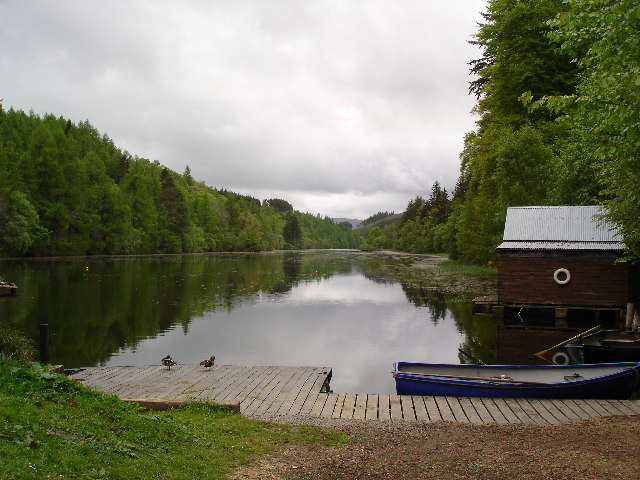
- Loch Park from the east

General information
- Location: Dufftown, Moray; Scotland
- Coordinates: 57.4748°N 3.0701°W
- Grid reference: NJ359432
- Platforms: 1

Other information
- Status: Disused

History
- Original company: Great North of Scotland Railway
- Pre-grouping: Great North of Scotland Railway
- Post-grouping: LNER

Key dates
- 1862: Line opened
- 1968: line closed to passengers
- 1991: Line closed to all traffic
- 2001: Line reopened
Location

Drummuir Curlers' Platform railway station was a private station opened on the Keith and Dufftown Railway for the use of the curlers belonging to the Drummuir Curling Club who played on the nearby Loch Park in the parish of Botriphnie. The GNoSR line ran from Keith to Dufftown.

== History ==
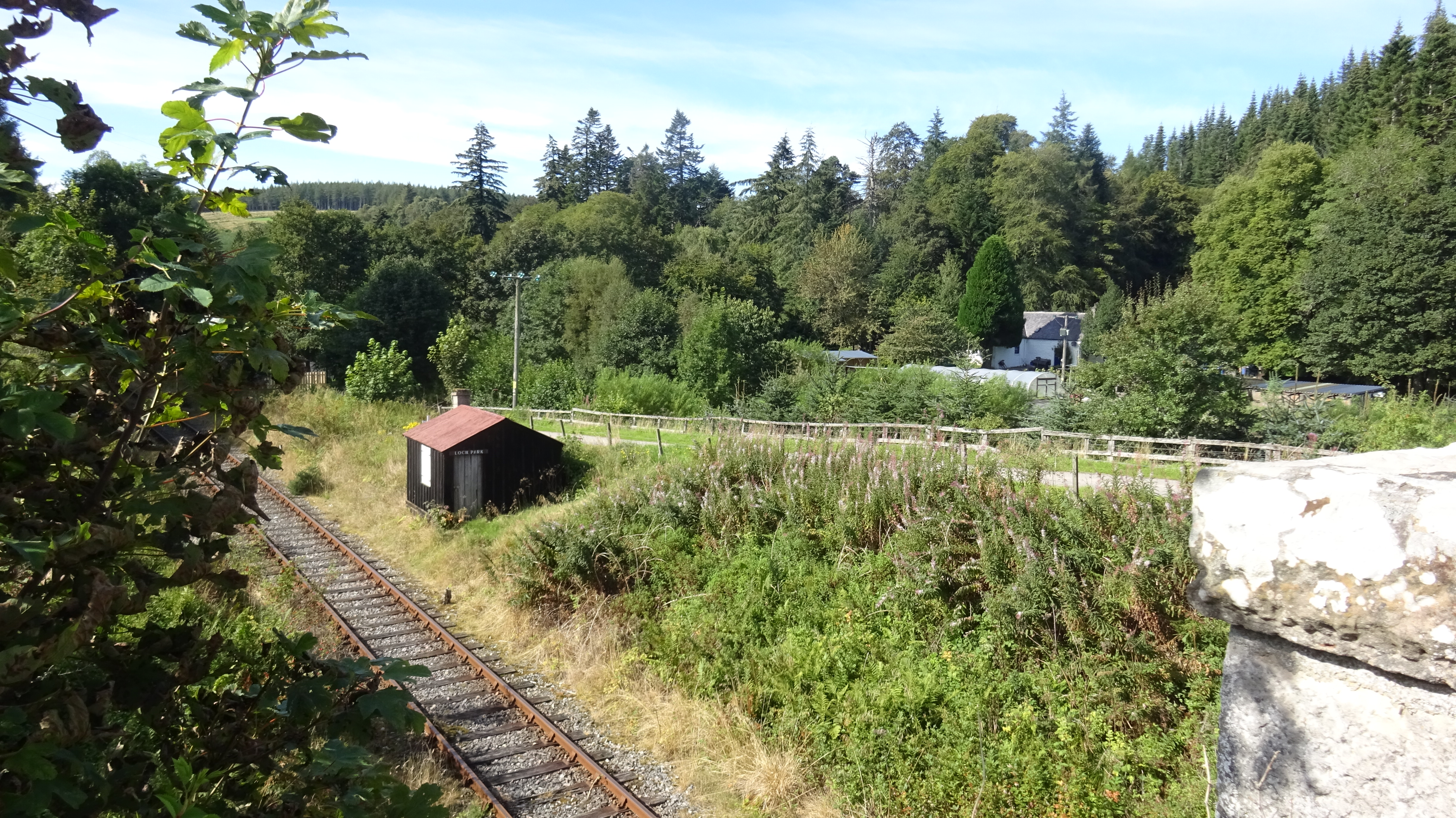
The site of the curlers' platform in 2019

The station had been opened by 1902 on the old Keith and Dufftown Railway line that had become part of the GNoSR and at grouping merged with the London and North Eastern Railway. It was not shown on later maps. It was located near the Sawmill Cottage on the northern side of the line at the eastern end of the loch. The line itself has been re-opened by a preservation railway.

The Aboyne Curling Club also had a private station, Aboyne Curling Pond railway station that stood beside the Loch of Aboyne on the Deeside Railway.

=== Drummuir Curling Club ===
The loch is artificial, created by the Drummuir Castle estate. The Drummuir Curling Club was formed in 1884 and joined the Royal Caledonian Curling Club in 1886 however it had left by 1922 and probably folded shortly after, otherwise the last record of the club was in 1911.

== Infrastructure ==
The 1899 OS map shows the single short station platform that was located on a straight section of the northern or loch side of this single track section of the branch not far from Sawmill Cottage. A road overbridge stood nearby and the lane gave direct access to the loch.

== Services ==
Apart from advertised events such as bonspiels the stations use would not have been listed and it did not appear on the public timetables, the station being private and the sport had a very seasonal and unpredictable requirement for train services.

== The site today ==
The station site has a lineside hut located on it. A new station to serve the water sports centre is being considered by the Keith and Dufftown Railway preservation society.

== See also ==
- Aboyne Curling Pond railway station
- Carsbreck railway station

== Sources ==
- Butt, R. V. J. (October 1995). The Directory of Railway Stations: details every public and private passenger station, halt, platform and stopping place, past and present (1st ed.). Sparkford: Patrick Stephens Ltd. ISBN 978-1-85260-508-7. OCLC 60251199. OL 11956311M.

Preceding station	Historical railways	Following station
Drummuir; Line and station closed	Great North of Scotland Railway	Dufftown; Line and station closed
