= Drummuir railway station =

Preserved railway station in Drummuir, Moray

Drummuir
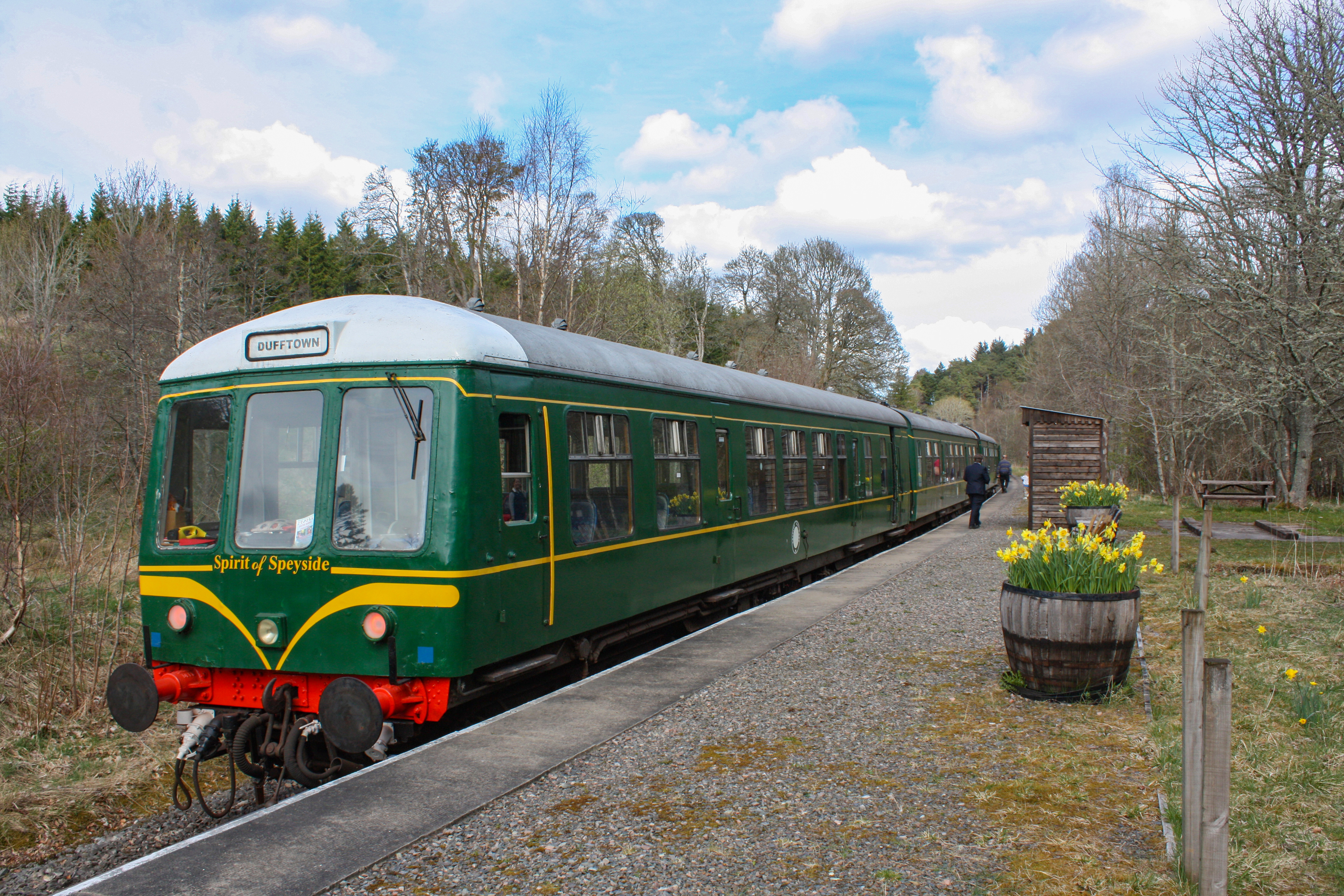
- The station with the 'Spirit of Speyside' Class 108

General information
- Location: Drummuir, Moray; Scotland
- Coordinates: 57.4842°N 3.0391°W
- Grid reference: NJ378442
- Platforms: 2 (before closure); 1 (after reopening)

Other information
- Status: Disused

History
- Original company: Keith and Dufftown Railway
- Pre-grouping: Great North of Scotland Railway
- Post-grouping: LNER; British Rail (Scottish Region)

Key dates
- 21 February 1862: Opened
- 6 May 1968: Closed to passengers
- 15 November 1971: Closed to goods
- 2003: Reopened as a heritage station
Location

Drummuir railway station is a preserved station that serves the village of Drummuir, Moray, Scotland on the Keith and Dufftown Railway. The station also served the nearby Drummuir Castle estate and Botriphnie Church and the old churchyard are in the vicinity, together with St Fomac's Well.

== History ==
The station was first opened in 1862 by the Keith and Dufftown Railway. The station was closed to passengers by British Railways in May 1968, but the line remained open for freight and special excursions for some time. It was reopened as a preserved station in 2003 by the Keith and Dufftown Railway Association.

=== Infrastructure ===
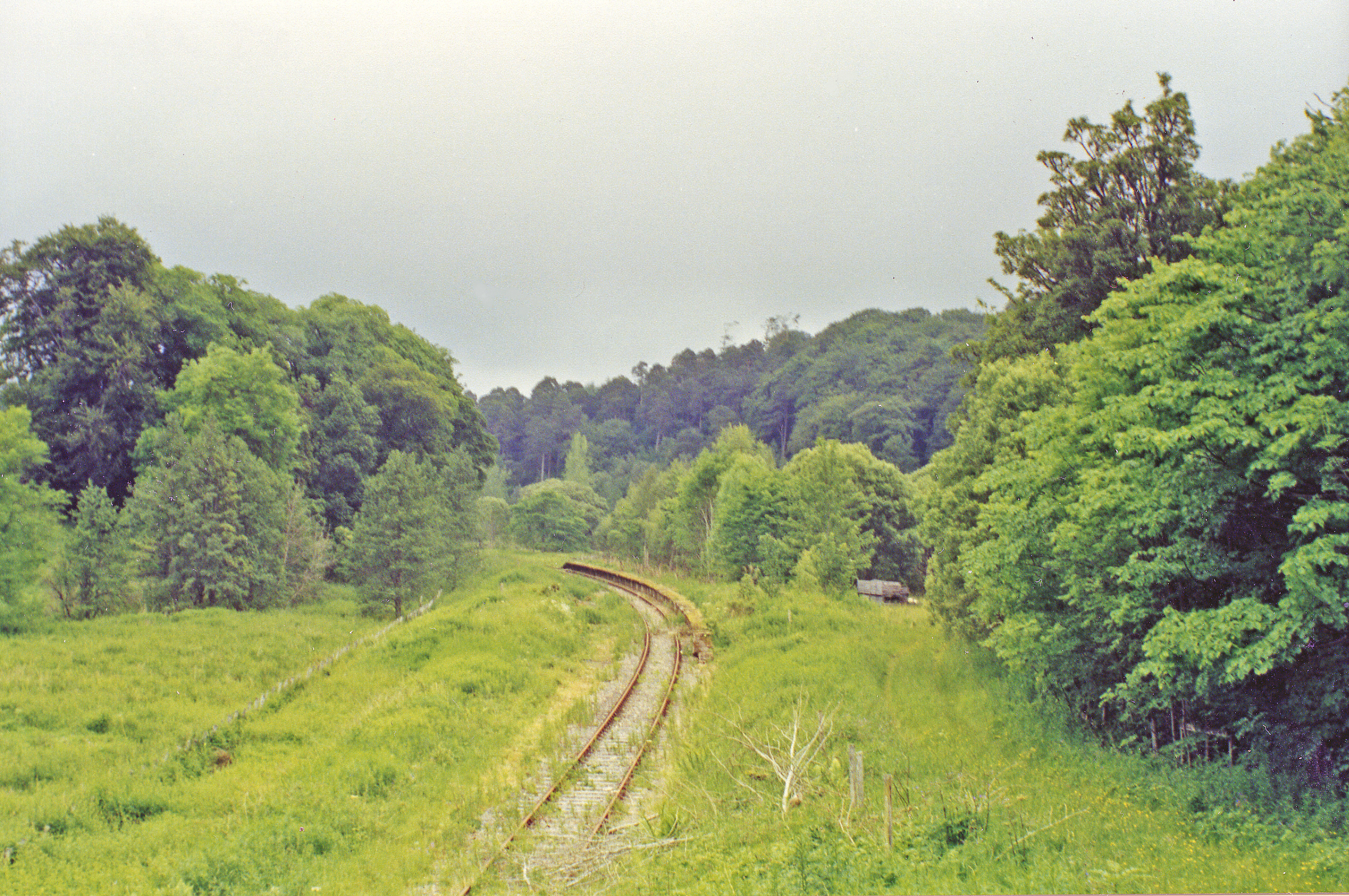
Remains of the railway in 1997

In 1869 the OS map shows that only a single platform was present with no passing loop, however a goods shed, loading dock and sidings were already in situ, approached by trains from the north-east.

By 1902 the station had two platforms, two signal boxes, a pedestrian footbridge, the goods yard to the east and a station building with ticket office and waiting room on the southbound platform. Ancillary buildings stood on the east side of the loading dock and sidings. The up platform had a small wooden shelter.

In 1967 the passing loop was lifted and the signal boxes were closed. The wooden station building was a Great North of Scotland Railway design however the old wooden footbridge had been replaced by a LNER metal design fabricated from old rails and signal wire.

=== Closure and reopening ===
The station had closed to regular passenger services in May 1968 and closed to goods on 15/11/71. 'Northern Belle' excursion trains from Aberdeen however used the line for several years in the summer from 1984 and BR ran special trains from London until early 1991 when deteriorating infrastructure brought them to an end. The Keith - Dufftown section was however 'mothballed' by BR and was then purchased by the Keith and Dufftown Railway and it is now publicised as 'The Whisky Line'.

== Services ==
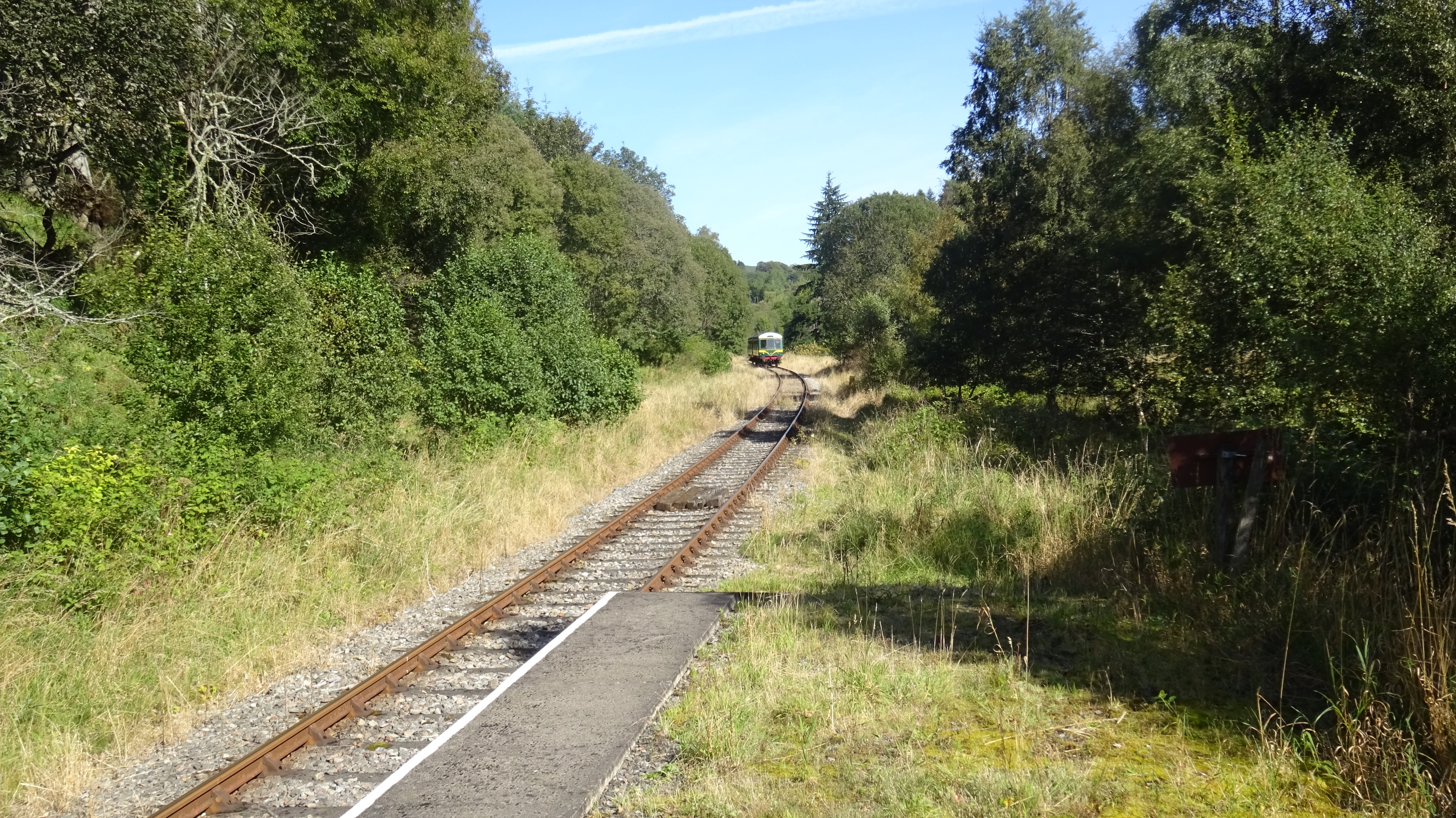
Train for Dufftown arriving at Drummuir.

The station has a car park and nature trail with a bird hide has been created in the old sidings and loading dock area. It is a regular timetabled stop for trains during the operating season with three trains a day in each direction (datum 2019).

== Notes ==
Preceding station	Historical railways	Following station
Drummuir Curlers' Platform	Great North of Scotland Railway; Keith and Dufftown Railway	Towiemore Halt
