= Towiemore Halt railway station =

Heritage railway station in Towiemore, Moray

Towiemore Halt

General information
- Location: Towiemore, Moray; Scotland
- Coordinates: 57.49636°N 3.01148°W
- Platforms: 1

Other information
- Status: Disused

History
- Post-grouping: LNER; British Rail (Scottish Region)

Key dates
- 9 June 1924: opened for workmen
- July 1937: Public Opening
- 1938: Name changed to Towiemore Halt
- 6 May 1968: Closed
- 2001: Re-opened
Location

Towiemore Halt railway station served the hamlet of Towiemore and its distillery as a private and later as a public halt in Moray, Scotland, from 1937 to 1968 on the Keith and Dufftown Railway. The line was re-opened in 2001 and the station is now a request stop.

== History ==
The Drummuir Lime Kiln Sidings were opened on 1 June 1863, known by 1884 as Botriphine after the name of the parish. The sidings were closed in 1890. The sidings were re-opened on 1 January 1898 as Towiemore. From 9 June 1924 distillery workers were able to use a small platform at the site and in July 1937 the station opened to the public with its name appearing on the London and North Eastern Railway timetables as Towiemore. The suffix 'halt' was added to its name in 1938. Additional sidings were added when the Towiemore Distillery opened, however it closed in 1930, only the maltings being retained, for a time.

The station was closed to both passengers and goods traffic in 1968. Only traces of the old platform now remain. It was re-opened in 2001 by the Keith and Dufftown Railway on the new heritage line.

=== Infrastructure ===
In 1883 Botriphine Siding signal box opened, closed in 1890 but re-opened in 1895 with the establishment of Towiemore Distillery. In 1896 the signalbox was replaced with a groundframe. In 1902 the distillery was served by three sidings from the north.

The station stood as a wooden platform on the northern side of the single track main line with a short platform and a Great North of Scotland Railway coach body was used as a shelter, etc. The coach body remained in situ until the 1980s when it was purchased by a local farmer and used as a hen house.

By 2001 the line had re-opened and a request halt with a short platform and a basic shelter had been built.

=== Services ===
Towiemore is a regular timetabled request stop for trains during the operating season with three trains a day in each direction (datum 2019).

== Notes ==
Preceding station	Historical railways	Following station
Drummuir	London and North Eastern Railway; Keith and Dufftown Railway	Auchindachy; Station closed
