= Strathisla Mills railway station =

Disused railway station in Keith, Moray

Coordinates: 57.546871°N 2.955751°W

Strathisla Mills

General information
- Location: Keith, Moray; Scotland
- Platforms: 1

Other information
- Status: Disused

History
- Opened: 1985
- Closed: August 1993
- Original company: ScotRail (British Rail)
Location

Strathisla Mills railway station served the town of Keith, Moray, Scotland from 1985 to 1993 on the Keith and Dufftown Railway.

== History ==
The station opened in 1985 by ScotRail, although it was only used for excursions at first until opening to the public on 29 May 1989. It was only intended to serve visitors at Strathisla distillery. The station closed in August 1993.

Preceding station	Historical railways	Following station
Keith Town	Great North of Scotland Railway; Keith and Dufftown Railway	Keith
