= Drummuir =

Coordinates: 57.484°N 3.034°W

Drummuir: Scottish Gaelic: Druim Iubhair
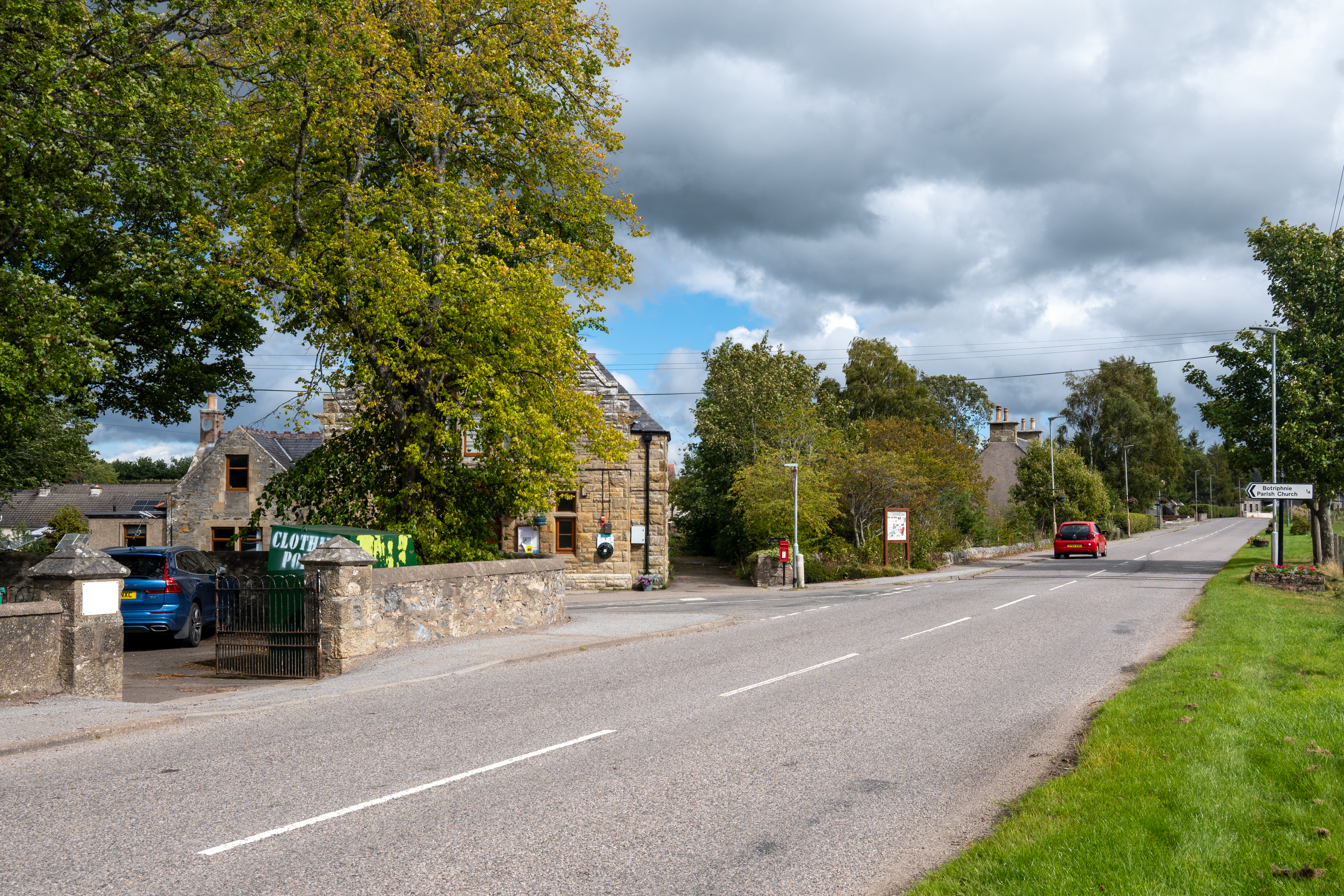

- Location within Moray
- Council area: Moray
- Lieutenancy area: Banffshire
- Country: Scotland
- Sovereign state: United Kingdom
- Police: Scotland
- Fire: Scottish
- Ambulance: Scottish

Drummuir (Scottish Gaelic: Druim Iubhair) is a small village in Scotland, in the traditional county of Banffshire, and in the Moray council area. It is between Dufftown (5 miles (8 km)), Keith (8 miles (13 km)) and Huntly (9 miles (14 km)).

Its old name was Botriphnie (Gaelic: Both Draighnigh), and this is the name still sometimes used for the parish. Drummuir comes from Druim Iubhair, Scottish Gaelic for "Yew Ridge"; the name Botriphnie (Scottish Gaelic: Both Draighnigh), may come from Pictish origins and be a "Pit-" name, meaning "Thorn Farm".

Drummuir's biggest building is "Drummuir Castle", a Strawberry Hill-type Gothic Victorian building, with extensive gardens. The castle was built by the Gordon-Duffs who are still the main landowners in the area.

The Keith and Dufftown Railway runs by the village from a defunct distillery. A train is regularly run by the Keith and Dufftown railway association. Drummuir railway station once served the castle, local farms and dwellings whilst Drummuir Curlers' Platform was a private station once used by curlers on Loch Park.

The River Isla which flows down to Keith through Strathisla, and Davidston Burn (or Davieburn), a small tributary of the Isla are the two main rivers in the area. Ben Rinnes is visible to the west.
