= Auchindachy railway station =

Disused railway station in Auchindachy, Moray

Coordinates: 57.51416°N 2.99344°W

Auchindachy
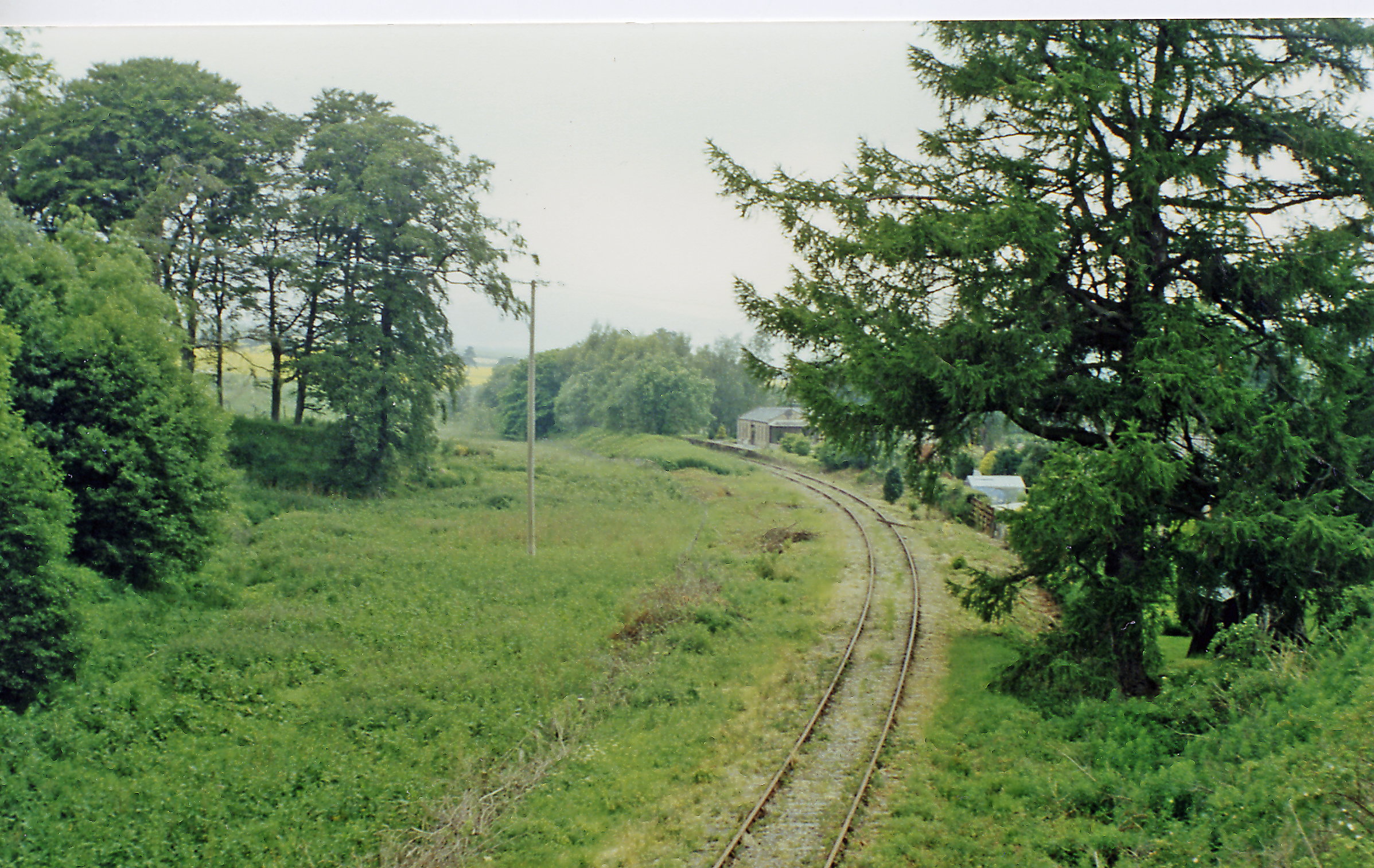
- Location of the station (1997)

General information
- Location: Auchindachy, Moray; Scotland
- Platforms: 1

Other information
- Status: Disused

History
- Original company: Keith and Dufftown Railway
- Pre-grouping: Great North of Scotland Railway
- Post-grouping: London and North Eastern Railway

Key dates
- 21 February 1862: Station opens as Botriphnie
- October 1862: Station renamed Auchindachy
- 6 May 1968: Station closes
Location

Auchindachy railway station served the village of Auchindachy in Scotland. Served by the Keith and Dufftown railway it was on the Great North of Scotland line that ran from Keith to Elgin.

== History ==
Opened by the Keith and Dufftown Railway (GNoSR). Then station passed on to the London and North Eastern Railway during the Grouping of 1923. Passing on to the Scottish Region of British Railways during the nationalisation of 1948, it was then closed by the British Railways Board.

== The site today ==
The old railway buildings and platform remain next to the track. The buildings are now privately owned and lived in. The preserved Keith and Dufftown Railway runs pass this former station en route.

Preceding station	Disused railways	Following station
Keith Town	London and North Eastern Railway; Keith and Dufftown Railway (GNoSR)	Towiemore Halt
