= Carwyn Davies =

Wales international rugby union footballer (1964–1997)

Carwyn Davies (17 April 1964 – 10 February 1997) was a Welsh international rugby union player.

Davies was born in Llandovery, Carmarthenshire. He was a rugby union player for Llanelli and also played seven international matches for Wales between 1988 and 1989 as a winger.

As a Llanelli player he held the club's try-scoring record scoring 45 tries in 44 games during the 1988/9 season. He scored 121 tries in 159 matches for Llanelli.

Davies worked as a farmer near Llandeilo, Carmarthenshire and witnessed the Glanrhyd Bridge railway accident early on 19 October 1987, when four people died. He later helped ferry rescuers to the bridge using the farm's tractor. He retired from first class rugby in 1991 to run the Llangadog farm, though he continued to play for his local village team.

He died aged only 32 on 10 February 1997 after being found dead in his fume-filled car at his home. He had 2 daughters- Elen Mair and Catrin Anna.
