= Glanrhyd Bridge collapse =

1987 railway accident in Carmarthenshire, Wales

Coordinates: 51.92534°N 3.90994°W

- How the train came to rest, with the rear carriage still on the remains of the bridge

Details
- Date: 19 October 1987
- Location: Llandeilo, Carmarthenshire
- Country: Wales, UK
- Line: Heart of Wales Line
- Cause: Bridge swept away

Statistics
- Trains: 1
- Deaths: 4

On 19 October 1987, a train on the Heart of Wales line derailed and fell into the River Towy due to the partial collapse of the Glanrhyd Bridge near Llandeilo, Carmarthenshire. Four people died as a result of the tragedy; the driver and three of the passengers drowned.

== Description ==
The event took place early on Monday 19 October 1987. Several days prior, the Great Storm of 1987 occurred, causing widespread damage to infrastructure across Britain. On the Sunday afternoon, a driver who had been attending to engineering works in Llandrindod Wells reported flooding along the line. The responsible traffic manager, after investigation and some deliberation, decided to accompany the first train out on the Monday: the 05:27 from Swansea to Shrewsbury.

The 05:27, which consisted of a two-car Class 108 DMU, fell into the River Towy near Llandeilo at approximately 07:15. The accident was caused by the Glanrhyd Bridge being partially washed away by the swollen river. The train was moving at only 10 mph (16 km/h), which was the normal speed limit for this bridge.

Carwyn Davies, a nearby farmer (and amateur rugby player for Llanelli), was investigating the flooding on his farm shortly after 7am. He was 400 yards (370 m) from the bridge in a flooded field when he saw—despite the fact that it was still "quite dark and raining"— that a central section of the railway bridge had collapsed onto a "V" shape. He attempted to return to his house to telephone a warning, but had not reached there when he heard the train approaching and saw the first carriage "take off" from the bridge. Davies later helped rescuers to reach the bridge using his tractor.

Of the ten people on board the train, three passengers and three members of British Rail staff managed to escape but the driver and three passengers drowned. Staff on board included a traffic manager and an engineer who were accompanying the train to inspect the route after reports of flooding and track damage had been received the previous day. The front carriage of the train left the tracks and fell into the swollen river at Glanrhyd Bridge, while the rear carriage remained on a section of the bridge, partially on the rails and above water. The front carriage initially remained afloat but began to flood. Some passengers and staff were able to make their way through to the rear carriage, before the front carriage broke away and was submerged, drowning the driver and three of the passengers (an elderly married couple and a fourteen-year-old schoolboy) who were still inside.

The primary cause of the collapse was found to be scour at the downstream end of one of the bridge piers, causing a hole into which the pier eventually fell.

A result of the incident was that the procedures for checking railway bridges were tightened. There were no railway accidents in Wales resulting in a passenger fatality between this accident and the 21 October 2024 collision near Talerddig Despite this, no prosecutions took place.

A replacement bridge was subsequently constructed at the site.

== Inquest ==
An inquest was held in July 1988, at which the jury returned a verdict of "Unlawful Killing" on all four of the victims.
