= Keith Town railway station =

Disused railway station in Keith, Moray

Keith Town
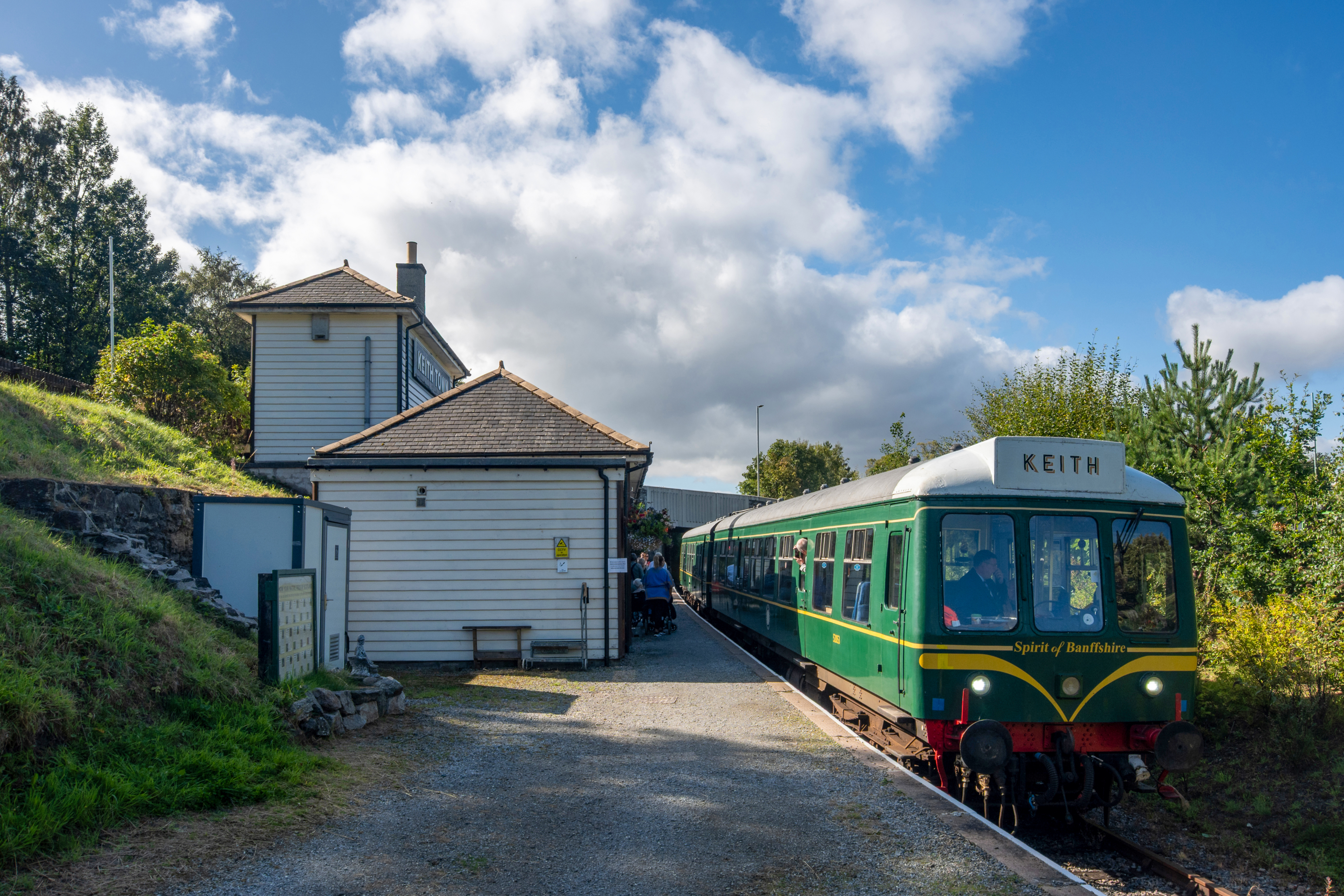
- The preserved station with the 'Spirit of Banffshire' Class 108

General information
- Location: Keith, Moray; Scotland
- Coordinates: 57.5434°N 2.9557°W
- Grid reference: NJ428507
- Platforms: 1

Other information
- Status: Open as a heritage railway station

History
- Original company: Keith and Dufftown Railway
- Pre-grouping: Great North of Scotland Railway
- Post-grouping: LNER; British Rail (Scottish Region)

Key dates
- 21 February 1862: Opened as Earlsmill
- 1 May 1897: Name changed to Keith Town
- 6 May 1968: Closed
- 2005: Reopened as a preserved station
Location

Keith Town railway station serves the town of Keith, Moray on the Keith and Dufftown Railway.

== History ==
The station opened as Earlsmill on 21 February 1862 by the Keith and Dufftown Railway. It was renamed Keith Town on 1 May 1897. The station closed on 6 May 1968 and the station building and booking office were later demolished. In 2005, the Keith and Dufftown Association reopened the station as a preserved station and rebuilt it.

== Stationmasters ==
- Robert Milne (formerly station master at Drummuir)
- James Maconnachie until 1891
- Charles Kennedy 1891 - 1901
- Robert Taylor from 1901 (formerly station master at Advie)
- Archibald Munro 1931 - 1942 (formerly station master at Peterhead, also station master at Keith)
- William Barclay until 1949 (also station master at Keith)
- William A. Graham from 1949 (formerly station master at Longtown, Cumberland, also station master at Keith)

Preceding station	Disused railways	Following station
Auchindachy; Line and station closed	Great North of Scotland Railway; Keith and Dufftown Railway	Strathisla Mills; Line and station closed
