= Dufftown railway station =

Preserved railway station in Dufftown, Moray

Dufftown
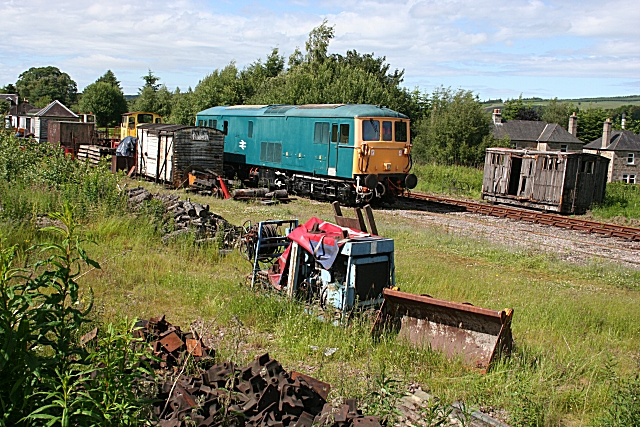
- A diesel locomotive at the station in 2007

General information
- Location: Dufftown, Moray; Scotland
- Coordinates: 57.458°N 3.1313°W
- Grid reference: NJ322414
- Platforms: 2

Other information
- Status: Disused

History
- Original company: Keith and Dufftown Railway
- Pre-grouping: Great North of Scotland Railway
- Post-grouping: LNER; British Rail (Scottish Region)

Key dates
- 21 February 1862: Opened
- 6 May 1968: Closed for passengers
- 1991: closed completely
- 2003: Reopened as a preserved station
Location

Dufftown railway station is a preserved railway station that serves the burgh of Dufftown, Moray, Scotland on the Keith and Dufftown Railway.

== History ==
The station first opened on 21 February 1862 by the Keith and Dufftown Railway. There was a goods yard to the southwest, which is used for stock storage nowadays. The station closed on 6 May 1968 to passengers. The line for westbound trains was lifted shortly after. Goods traffic ceased around 1991. In 2003, the Keith and Dufftown Association reopened the station and the line as a preserved railway and set up their headquarters at the station.
