= Keith and Dufftown Railway =

Heritage railway in Moray, Scotland

The Whisky Line
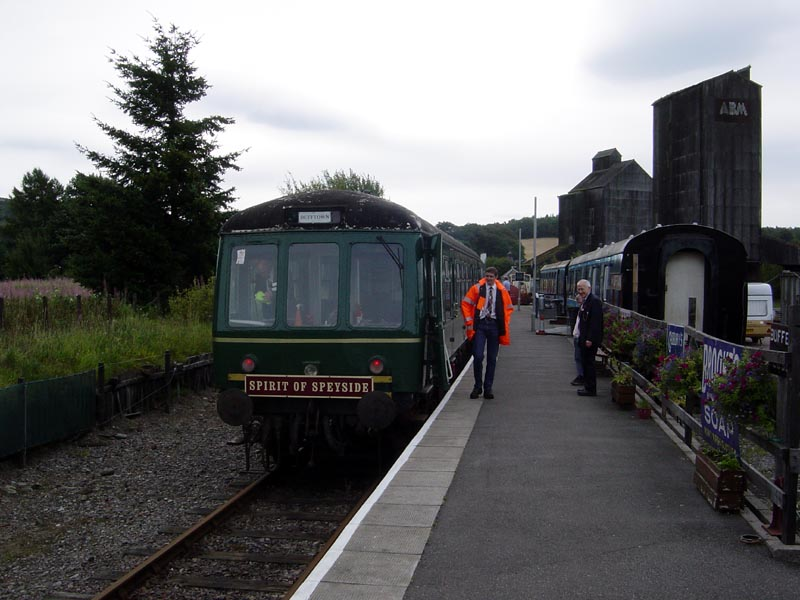
- Class 108 diesel multiple unit "Spirit of Speyside".
- Locale: Keith, Moray
- Terminus: Dufftown railway station

Commercial operations
- Built by: Keith and Dufftown Railway (GNoSR)
- Original gauge: 4 ft 8 1/2 in (1,435 mm) standard gauge

Preserved operations
- Owned by: The Keith & Dufftown Railway Association
- Stations: 3
- Length: 11 miles (18 km)
- Preserved gauge: 1,435 mm (4 ft 8 1/2 in)

Preservation history
- 1998: Transferred from Railtrack to Keith & Dufftown Railway Association
- June 2000: Reopened to traffic

The Keith and Dufftown Railway ("The Whisky Line") is a heritage railway in Scotland, running for 11 miles (18 km) from Keith Town, Keith (Ordnance Survey grid reference NJ429508) to Dufftown (NJ322414) via Drummuir (NJ378442) and Auchindachy.

Originally the former Great North of Scotland Railway's Keith and Dufftown Railway, which was part of the link Aberdeen with Elgin (with the Strathspey Railway and Morayshire Railway), the line was latterly a freight-only branch for British Rail then truncated at Dufftown and serving the distillery there. Regular passenger services had been withdrawn in May 1968, but in later years it hosted a series of Northern Belle summer Sunday lunch specials from Aberdeen. These ceased in 1991 and after several years disuse, the line passed into the hands of the current operator in 1998; regular heritage trains then began running in 2000.

The line is open, and a regular service runs throughout the railway's operating season from March to September. Special events are also run, including Santa Specials and Scots Nights. These services are run on the Class 108 DMUs.

Dufftown is the main centre of operation of the railway, and has a booking office, a waiting room and a café called the Sidings Café, which is open March to November. There are two headshunts and a loop. Work is being undertaken to install a new loop at Dufftown so that there can be two tracks going into the new engine shed.

At Keith Town station, there is a booking office and a shop which sells railway memorabilia, books, Thomas the Tank Engine items and model railway items which are sold by members of the association. This shop too is also only open during the operating season.

At present there is no connection to the main line: there are two 60 ft (18 m) sections of track uplifted (these were removed in 1998 when the line was handed over). However, there are long-term plans to reconnect to the mainline; there were discussions about this between the K&DRA, the local MSP Richard Lochhead and Transport Scotland in the autumn of 2015.

== Rolling stock ==
Key:	In service	Withdrawn	Preserved	Sold for scrap	Under repair	Sold for further use

Number	Class	Name	Year acquired	Previous Operator	Livery	Status
	Andrew Barclay 0-4-0 Diesel Hydraulic	No.415	August 2015	ex-Castle Donington Power Station	Blue	
	English Electric 0-6-0 DM	Spirit O'Fife	15 March 2000	ex-Scottish Grain Distillers	J&B Cream	
	Clayton 0-4-0 DM	The Wee Mac		ex-Royal Navy Dockyard, Rosyth	Green	
51568+52053	Class 108	Spirit of Banffshire	Summer 2001	ex-British Rail	BR Green	
53628+54223	Class 108	Spirit of Speyside	7 March 2000	ex-British Rail	BR Green	
56224	Class 108	"Dram Tram"	17 March 2010	ex-British Rail	BR Green	Built in 1959. - Renovated in 2022 as a Whisky Bar
140001	Class 140		1994	ex-British Rail	BR Rail Blue and Grey	Formed of 55500+55501. Prototype
144022	Class 144		4 September 2020	ex-Northern Trains	Northern Rail Unbranded	Formed of 55821+55858+55844.
Unknown	Class 107		September 2023	ex-British Rail, Strathspey Railway (Preserved)	Strathspey Blue Livery	Recently Purchased for Repair
Unknown	Class 107		September 2023	ex-British Rail, Strathspey Railway (Preserved)	Strathspey Blue Livery	Recently Purchased for Repair

The railway also owns two BR Mk1 Coaches No81295 and No975758, and a Mk2f TSO. The Mk2f arrived to replace the two Pullman coaches that were returned south.

The Keith and Dufftown also has 3 Canadian Sprinters which could be used to inspect the line. In addition, there is a variety of permanent way wagons, including 2 "Grampus" wagons, a "Dogfish" ballast wagon, a "Salmon" wagon and a guard's van.
