= British Rail Class 108 =

British diesel multiple unit train

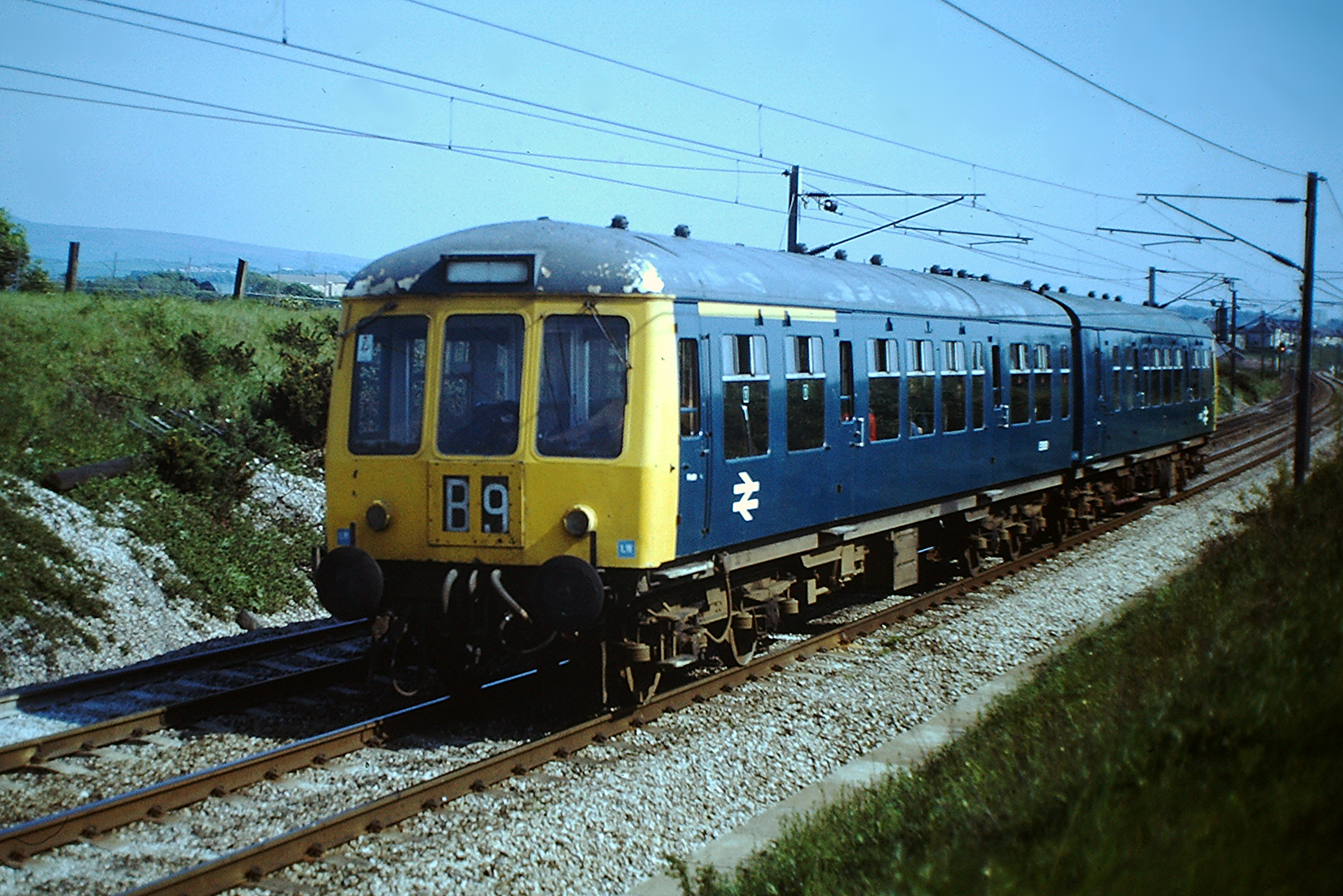
- A class 108 near Lancaster in 1975

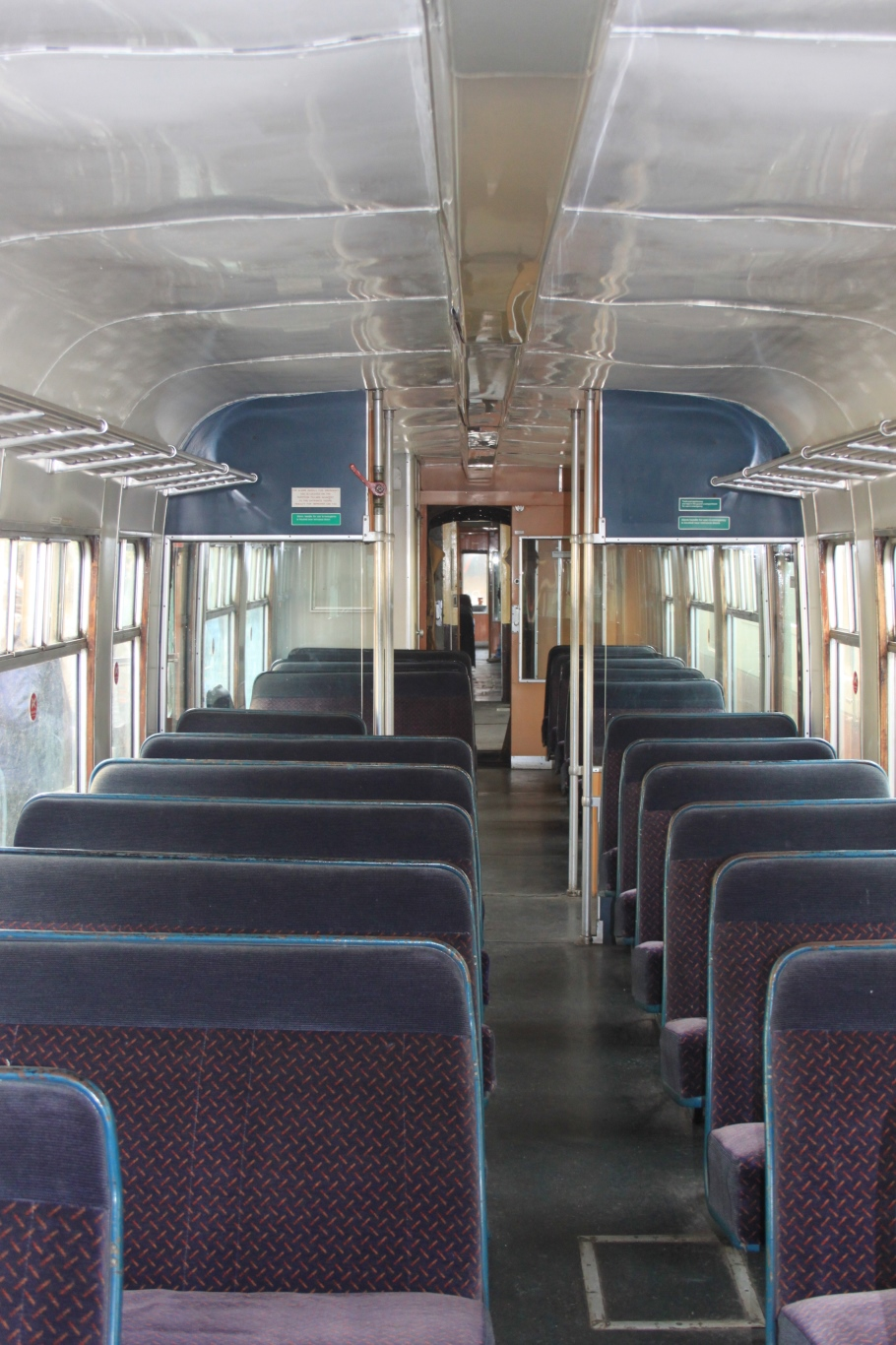
- The second class saloon of 52054 on the Bodmin and Wenford Railway.
- In service: 1958–1993
- Manufacturer: British Railways
- Built at: Derby Works
- Family name: First generation
- Replaced: Steam locomotives and carriages
- Constructed: 1958–1961
- Scrapped: 1964–1993
- Number built: DMBS: 152, DMCL: 58, DTCL: 106, TSL: 11, TBSL: 6. Total: 333 cars
- Number preserved: 32 sets
- Formation: 2, 3, or 4-car sets
- Capacity: DMBS: 52 second class, DMCL: 12 first 53 second, DTCL: 12 first 53 second, TSL: 68 second class, TBSL: 50 second class
- Operator: British Rail
- Lines served: LMR; NER

Specifications
- Car length: 58 ft 1 in (17.70 m)
- Width: 9 ft 3 in (2.82 m)
- Height: 12 ft 4 in (3.76 m)
- Maximum speed: 70 mph (113 km/h)
- Weight: Power cars: 29.5 tonnes (29.0 long tons; 32.5 short tons), Trailer cars: 21.5 to 23.5 tonnes (21.2 to 23.1 long tons; 23.7 to 25.9 short tons)
- Prime mover: Two BUT (AEC) then BUT (Leyland)
- Power output: 150 bhp (110 kW) per engine
- Transmission: Mechanical: 4-speed epicyclic gearbox
- Safety system: AWS
- Multiple working: ■ Blue Square
- Track gauge: 4 ft 8 1/2 in (1,435 mm)

The British Rail Class 108 diesel multiple units were built by BR Derby from 1958 to 1961, with a final production quantity of 333 vehicles.

== Overview ==
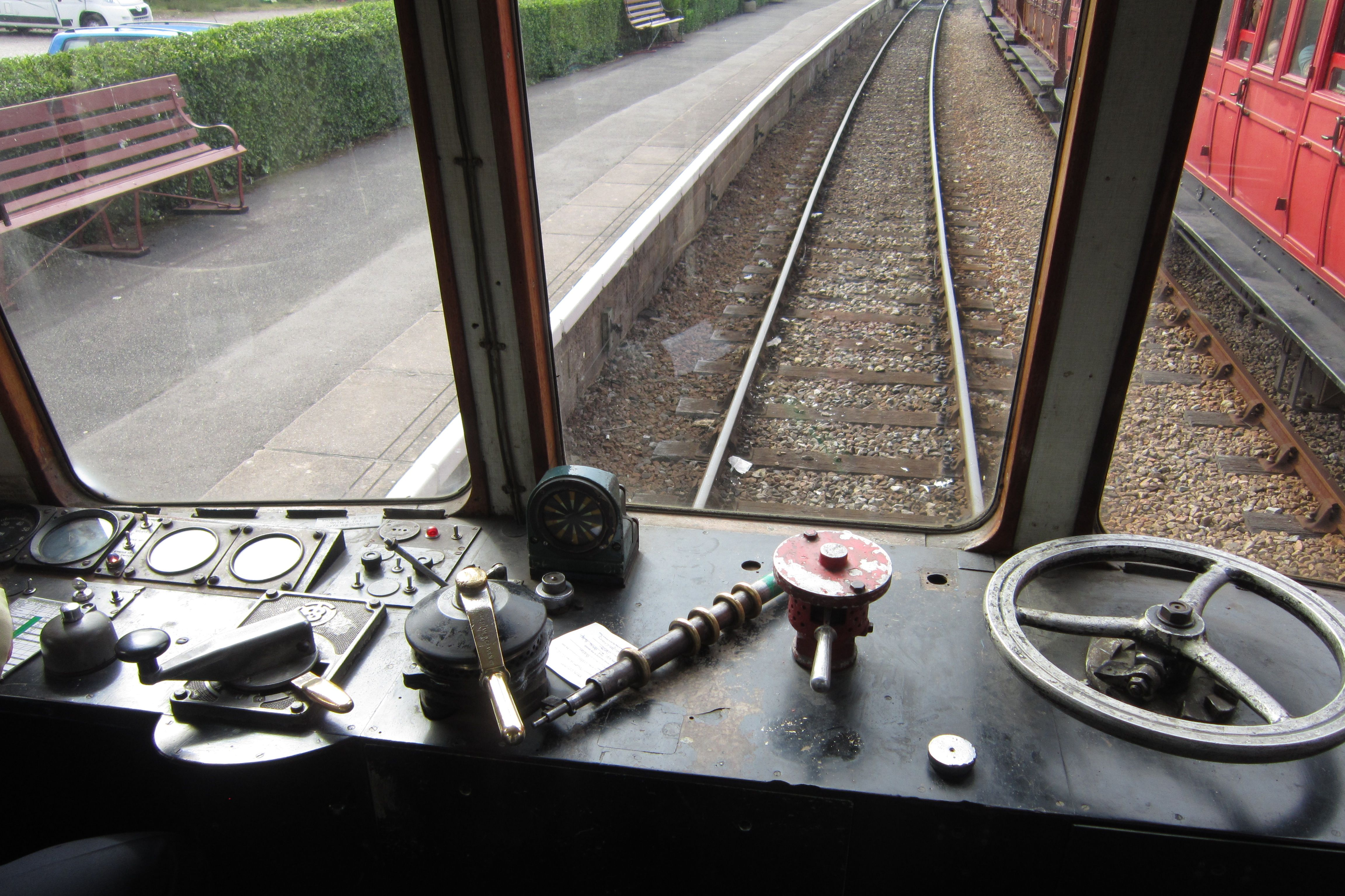
Driver's cab, with the signal token in the middle

The 108 was formed as a 2-, 3-, or 4-car unit. Its aluminium body led the type to be classed as a lightweight unit. These units stayed in regular service until 1990, when they began to be withdrawn from traffic. They were replaced on regional services by the new Sprinter derivative units, or by Turbo units on services around London. The final units lasted in traffic until October 1993, although many saw further use in departmental service, as sandite or route-learner units. Good condition on withdrawal and lack of asbestos have ensured that many of this class are now used on preserved railway lines.

== Orders ==
Table of orders
Lot No.	Car type	Qty	Fleet No.	Notes
30406	Driving Motor Brake Second (DMBS)	26	50599–50624	ER power-trailer and power-twin sets
30407	Driving Motor Brake Second (DMBS)	5	50625–50629	LMR power-trailer sets
30408	Driving Motor Composite with lavatory (DMCL)	17	50630–50646	ER power-twin and four-car sets
30409	Driving Trailer Composite with lavatory (DTCL)	21	56190–56210	ER Driving-trailer sets
30410	Driving Trailer Composite with lavatory (DTCL)	5	56211–56215	LMR Driving-trailer sets
30411	Trailer Second with lavatory (TSL)	6	59380–59385	ER four-car sets
30412	Trailer Brake Second with lavatory (TBSL)	6	59245–59250	ER four-car sets
30460	Driving Motor Brake Second (DMBS)	12	50924–50935	LMR power-twin sets
30461	Driving Motor Composite with lavatory (DMCL)	12	51561–51572	LMR power-twin sets
30465	Driving Motor Brake Second (DMBS)	50	50938–50987	LMR power-trailer sets
30466	Driving Trailer Composite with lavatory (DTCL)	50	56221–56270	LMR Driving-trailer sets
30493	Trailer Second with lavatory (TSL)	5	59386–59390	ER (power-twin to) three-car sets
30498	Driving Motor Brake Second (DMBS)	9	51416–51424	LMR power-trailer sets
30499	Driving Trailer Composite with lavatory (DTCL)	9	56271–56279	LMR power-trailer sets
30601	Driving Motor Brake Second (DMBS)	50	51901–51950	LMR power-trailer and power-twin sets
30602	Driving Trailer Composite with lavatory (DTCL)	21	56484–56504	LMR Driving-trailer sets
30660	Driving Motor Composite with lavatory (DMCL)	29	52037–52065	LMR power-twin sets

== Accidents and incidents ==
- On 19 October 1987, after the Glanrhyd Bridge over the River Towy at Llandeilo, Carmarthenshire, was washed away by floodwater, a passenger train operated by a Class 108 unit fell into the river. Four people were killed.
- On 22 August 1990, a two-car Class 108 unit overran a signal and was in a head-on collision with a three-car unit majority-composed of Class 108 cars at Hyde Junction, Greater Manchester. Twenty-eight people were injured. The accident report noted the poor structural condition of the Class 108 vehicles compared to that of the Class 101 vehicle involved in the accident, and called for the 108 class to be withdrawn "as quickly as is practicable".

== Preservation ==
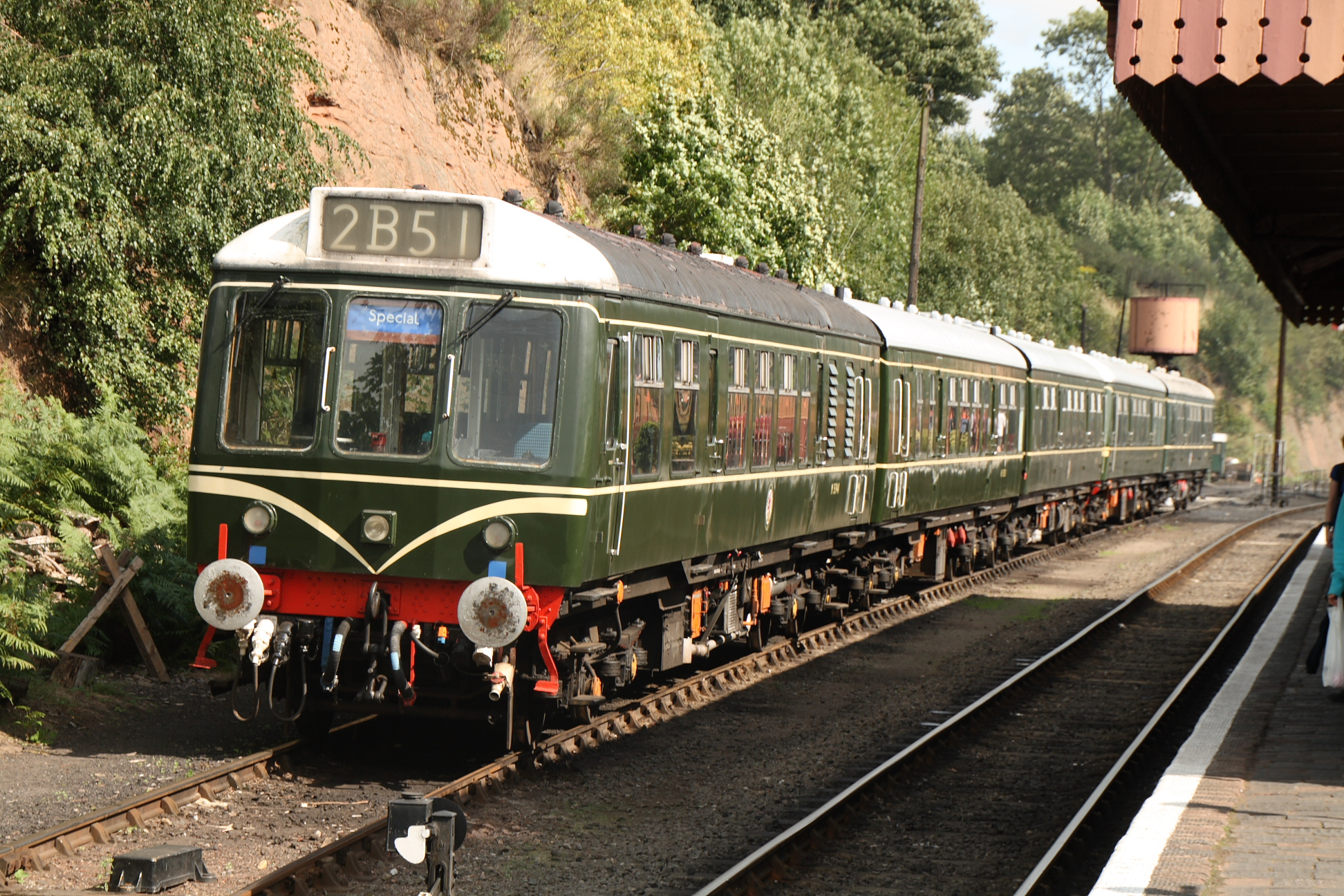
Five Class 108 vehicles at Bewdley on the SVR

Many vehicles have been preserved on heritage railways. None are currently certified for use on the main line – although the Swanage Railway's set was hauled from the railway to Eastleigh and back, for overhaul – and is believed to be the first class 108 to have been seen on main lines for a very long time.

Preserved examples
Set number	Vehicle numbers			Livery	Location	Notes
Set number	DMBS	TCL	DMCL	Livery	Location	Notes
-	50599	-	-	BR Blue	Ecclesbourne Valley Railway	Operational
-	50619	59387	51566	BR Green	Dean Forest Railway	Operational
-	50628	-	-	BR Green	Keith and Dufftown Railway	Operational
-	52044 (DMCL)	-	50632	BR Blue and Grey	Pontypool and Blaenavon Railway	Scrapped
-	50926	-	50645	BR Blue and Grey	Great Central Railway	Under Restoration
-	50928	-	51565	BR Green	Keighley and Worth Valley Railway	Under restoration
-	50933	-	52064	BR Green	Severn Valley Railway	Operational
-	50971	-	51571	BR Green	Kent and East Sussex Railway	Operational
-	50980	-	52054	BR Green	Weardale Railway	Operational
-	51922	-	51562	BR Green (51922) and BR Blue (51562)	National Railway Museum	Static Display
-	-	-	51567	BR Blue and Grey	Ecclesbourne Valley Railway	Stored
-	56274(DTCL)	-	51572	United Steel Red and Grey / BR Green	Wensleydale Railway	Stored
-	51907	-	56490(DTCL)	BR Blue and Grey	Llangollen Railway	Operational
-	51909	-	56271(DTCL)	BR Green	East Somerset Railway	Operational
-	51914	-	56492(DTCL)	BR Green	Dean Forest Railway	Operational
-	51919	-	52048	BR Blue	Garw Valley Railway	Operational
-	51933	-	56504(DTCL)	BR Green	Swanage Railway	Operational
-	51937	-	56484(DTCL)	BR White Stripe/ Blue and Grey	Poulton & Wyre Railway	Under Restoration
-	51941	-	-	BR Green	Severn Valley Railway	Operational
-	51942	-	56270(DTCL)	Network South East/BR Blue and Grey	Mid-Norfolk Railway	Stored
-	51947	-	-	BR Blue and Grey	Bodmin and Wenford Railway	Stored as a source for spare parts
-	51950	-	52062	Chocolate and Cream	Telford Steam Railway	Operational
-	-	-	52044	BR Blue and Grey	Pontypool and Blaenavon Railway	Operational
-	-	-	52053	BR Green	Keith and Dufftown Railway	Operational
-	-	59245(TBSL)	54207(DTCL)	Blood and Custard	Appleby Frodingham Railway Preservation Society	Operational
-	-	-	56208(DTCL)	BR Green	Severn Valley Railway	Operational
-	51618(Class 127)	-	56223(DTCL)	BR Green	East Anglian Railway Museum	Operational
-	-	-	56224(DTCL)	BR Green	Keith and Dufftown Railway	Operational
-	-	-	56279(DTCL)	BR Green	Lavender Line	Operational
-	-	-	56491(DTCL)	BR Green	Keith and Dufftown Railway	Operational
-	-	-	56495(DTCL)	BR Green	Kirklees Light Railway	Static Display
-	-	59250(TBSL)	-	BR Green	Severn Valley Railway	Operational

== Model railways ==
In 2007, Bachmann introduced OO gauge models of the Class 108 in BR green, BR blue and grey, and Network SouthEast liveries.
