= Keith and Dufftown Railway (GNoSR) =

UK railway company (1857–1866)

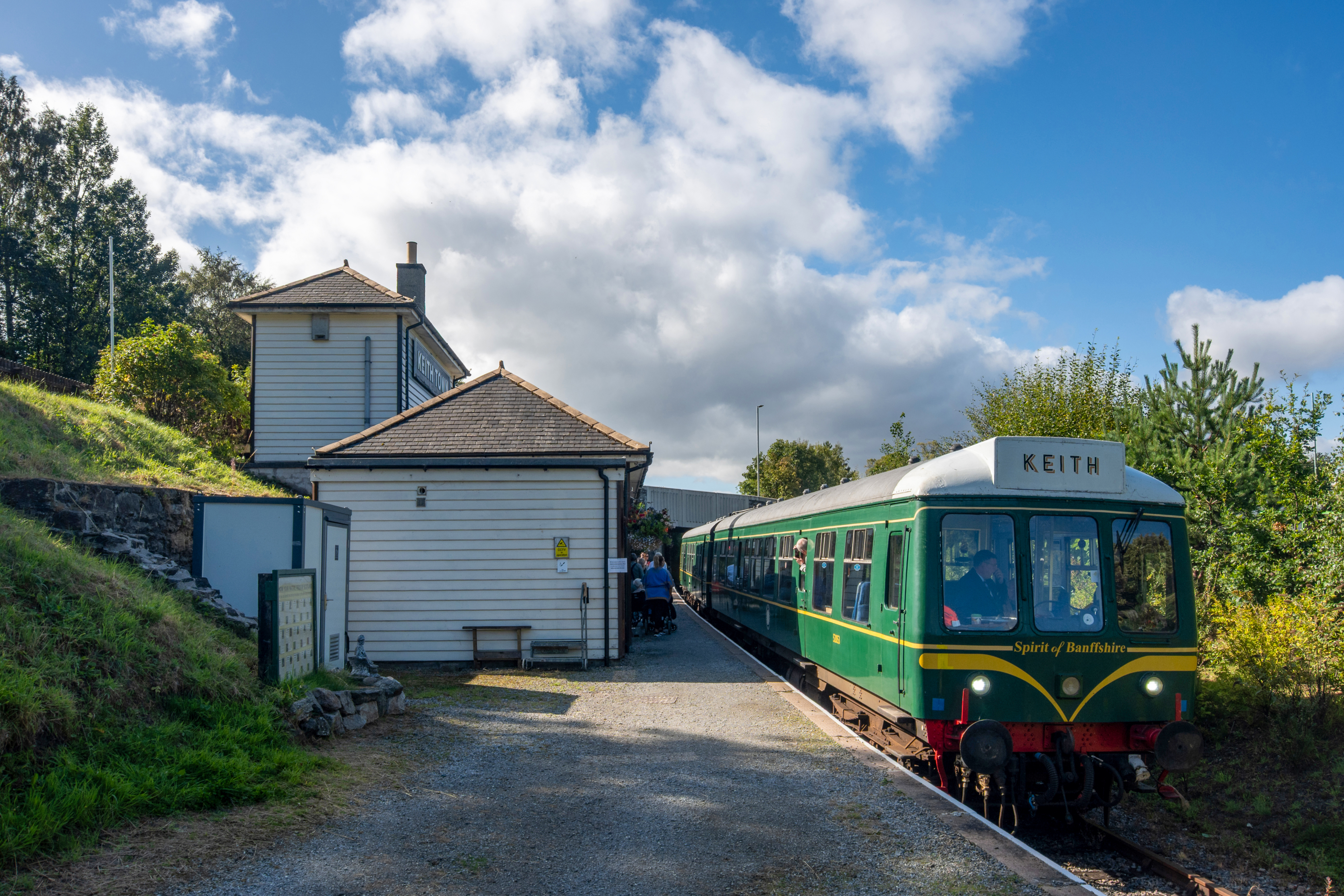
- Keith Town railway station with the 'Spirit of Banffshire' Class 108

Overview
- Locale: Scotland
- Dates of operation: 21 February 1862–30 July 1866
- Successor: Great North of Scotland Railway

Technical
- Track gauge: 4 ft 8 1/2 in (1,435 mm) standard gauge
- Length: 8 1/2 miles (13.7 km)

The Keith and Dufftown Railway was a railway company in Scotland. Its line ran between Dufftown and Keith on the main line between Inverness and Aberdeen. The company was formed in 1857, but it struggled to attract investors and for some years was unable to proceed with construction.

The larger Great North of Scotland Railway (GNoSR) saw that control of the Dufftown line would give it better access to Elgin and Perth, so the GNoSR invested in the Dufftown line, enabling it to open in 1862. The Speyside Railway connected to it at Dufftown, and the Morayshire Railway connected to the Speyside Railway at Craigellachie, giving the desired access to Elgin.

The Keith and Dufftown Railway was absorbed by the Great North of Scotland Railway in 1866. The line closed to passenger traffic in 1968 and completely in 1991, but a heritage group took it over and most of the route now operates under the original title of the Keith and Dufftown Railway.

== Before the Keith and Dufftown Railway ==
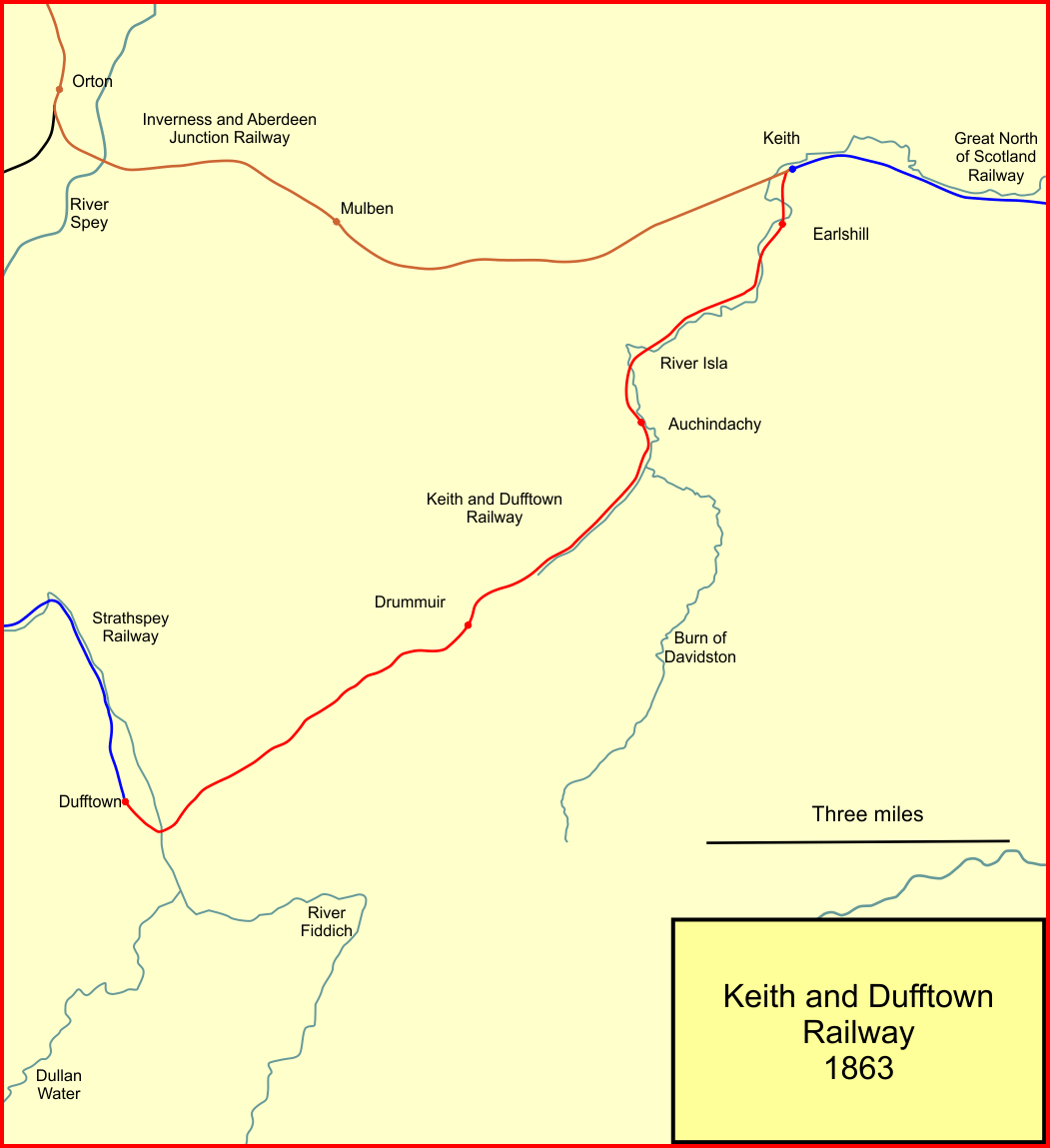
Dufftown

Keith was a market centre of considerable importance and it became the meeting point of two railways that had aspired to connect Aberdeen and Inverness. Neither could raise the capital to build the entire route, and eventually the Great North of Scotland Railway (GNoSR) built its line from Aberdeen to Keith, opening in 1856. The Inverness and Aberdeen Junction Railway built its own line to the Keith station from Inverness, opening in 1858. Although this provided a long-awaited railway link between Inverness and Aberdeen, there was a considerable and persistent friction between the two companies. Through passenger trains did not operate for many years: passengers had to change trains at Keith. For the people of Inverness, the way from Inverness to Central Scotland and the south involved a roundabout route, changing trains at Keith and then changing stations at Aberdeen to make an uncertain connection to the North British Railway for the onward transit southwards.

In 1845 the (proposed) Banffshire Railway deposited parliamentary plans for a 21-mile (34 km) line from Portgordon on the coast to Dufftown, passing through Keith. At first the prospects for this company looked good, but the financial crash following the Railway Mania made it impossible to raise money to build it, and it was dissolved.

== Authorisation, but delayed construction ==
Keith and Dufftown Railway Act 1857
- Act of Parliament
- Parliament of the United Kingdom
- Long title: An Act for making a Railway from Keith to Dufftown.
- Citation: 20 & 21 Vict. c. lxxxvii

Dates
- Royal assent: 27 July 1857

Text of statute as originally enacted

The motivation for a railway line linking Dufftown was still in place, and in 1856 plans were deposited for the Keith and Dufftown Railway (K&DR). It was to be a 9-mile (14 km) line, with a possible extension to mineral workings in Glenrinnes; capital was proposed to be £50,000; the bill allowed for the line to be worked by either the GNoSR or the Inverness and Aberdeen Junction Railway. The GNoSR, itself desperately short of money, agreed to subscribe £1,000 to the new company. On that basis the Keith and Dufftown Railway was authorised by an act of Parliament, the Keith and Dufftown Railway Act 1857 (20 & 21 Vict. c. lxxxvii) of 27 July 1857. Most of the route closely followed the River Isla but there were some stiff gradients.

The Keith and Dufftown directors had already provisionally arranged that Mitchell, Ireland of Montrose would construct the line for a price of £43,125, of which £7,500 would be in shares. The share subscription did not go well; by the time of the first ordinary general meeting in September, subscriptions and guarantees amounted to only £4,970, and the Great North's £1,000. It was not possible to start construction.

Keith and Dufftown Railway (Deviation) Act 1860
- Act of Parliament
- Parliament of the United Kingdom
- Long title: An Act to enable the Keith and Dufftown Railway Company to abandon their authorized Line of Railway, and to make a new Line of Railway instead thereof.
- Citation: 23 & 24 Vict. c. lxiii

Dates
- Royal assent: 25 May 1860

Text of statute as originally enacted

In fact so little was subscribed that, after a long hiatus, the construction contract was cancelled. In October 1858 the directors confirmed that, despite the stalemate, they would continue in the hope that something might turn up, ideally a major cash injection by the GNoSR. By October 1859 there was at last some movement: the Duke of Richmond guaranteed £7,500 and the Earl of Fife £5,000, provided that the Great North would take on the undertaking. This the GNoSR agreed to do, provided that half the capital was raised by bona fide local subscriptions. The original construction powers were due to expire on 1 July 1860, and a new bill had been prepared (by the GNoSR) to obtain an extension of time and to modify the route, at the cost of even steeper gradients. The bill was enacted as the Keith and Dufftown Railway (Deviation) Act 1860 (23 & 24 Vict. c. lxiii), of 25 May 1860.

== Competitors' proposals spur action ==
Interests in Inverness were now talking about a new line to Perth from Forres. This was bad news for the GNoSR, as Inverness people and goods would no longer need to travel via Aberdeen if such a line was built. The GNoSR official line on that was that "traffic between stations on the Inverness line and the south is apt to be over-rated". But they betrayed their true feelings by preparing a Bill to extend the Dufftown line 34 miles (55 km) down the Spey as far as Grantown, which was on the proposed line to Perth. This was to be the Strathspey Railway. Face was saved by emphasising that this was primarily for the timber and mineral traffic that might be generated on that route.

The GNoSR was now "taking the Keith and Dufftown Railway in hand, after the years of uncertainty" as Ross puts it. It was agreed to extend the line across the River Fiddich to Balvenie, as the original terminus was "quite unsuitable for Dufftown and district", for an additional £12,723.

The planned terminus had been on the east side of that river, but the new proposed location was also some considerable distance from the centre of the town. The new location was determined by the fact that the extension was to link with the proposed Strathspey Railway. To enable progress on completing the line, vital to the GNoSR, a shareholders' meeting of the GNoSR approved a subscription of £1,000 for the Keith and Dufftown Railway under its original act of Parliament, the Keith and Dufftown Railway Act 1857, and £25,000 under the Keith and Dufftown Railway (Deviation) Act 1860. Ordinary shareholders were still failing to take an interest in the K&DR line, and the weak financial status of the company made it impossible for it to get a loan from a financial institution in the ordinary way.

The Balvenie extension required a crossing of the River Fiddich, and during the work, the uncompleted viaduct collapsed. on 9 July 1861, killing a workman and his daughter, who had brought him his lunch. The cause was found to be the premature removal of the arch centres (Note: The temporary timber supports on which the arch rings are formed; the mortar joints had not cured fully.) before the structure had consolidated.

== Opening ==
The contractor was quickly able to complete the viaduct, and Captain Rich was able to approve the line for the Board of Trade on 19 February 1861; it opened on 21 February 1861. There were intermediate stations at Earlsmill, Botriphnie and Drummuir. Botriphnie was renamed Auchindachy in 1862; and Earlsmill was renamed Keith Town in 1897.

The train service consisted of four trains each way every weekday, later reduced to three.

== Connecting railways ==
The strategic value of the Keith and Dufftown Railway went beyond connecting Dufftown to the GNoSR main line. Two other railways gave useful onward connectivity that was keenly sought by the GNoSR.

=== The Morayshire Railway ===
The Morayshire Railway had established itself to the north of Elgin, at Lossiemouth, and now in 1858 it was building a branch line from Orton, on the Inverness and Aberdeen Junction Railway to Rothes and Craigellachie. This was completed on 23 December 1858, but the "Craigellachie" station was on the west side of the River Spey, at Dandaleith.

The Morayshire Railway operated between Elgin and its Craigellachie station, but that involved some running over the Inverness and Aberdeen Junction Railway; instead of co-operating for mutual benefit, the latter railway constantly obstructed the Morayshire's operation, and despite being desperately short of money, the MR decided to build its own independent line from Elgin to Rothes, opening it on 1 January 1862.

That gave access to its "Craigellachie" (Dandaleith) line, which it then extended over the River Spey to Craigellachie proper. This made the Morayshire Railway and the K&DR very attractive to the GNoSR, as that company could now reach Elgin independently of the Inverness and Aberdeen Junction Railway. Moreover it also gave access to a junction with the Speyside Railway, another line that was nominally independent but actually fostered by the GNoSR. The Craigellachie station was in fact named "Speyside Junction", underlining the strategic significance of the connection.

=== The Speyside Railway ===
The proposed Forres to Perth line of the Inverness and Perth Junction Railway (I&PJR) was becoming a reality; it opened in 1863. The GNoSR saw this as a threat that might be turned into an opportunity if it could connect into the line itself. It therefore encouraged the promotion of the Speyside Railway, which was to run from Dufftown through Craigellachie and Grantown to Boat of Garten, approaching Aviemore on the I&PJR.

All these schemes came together so that in July 1863, the Speyside Railway opened, and connected with the newly opened Morayshire extension at Craigellachie; for a time the station there was known as Speyside Junction. So the GNoSR, controlling these satellites, had access to Elgin and to the main line south to Perth. However if the objective was to by-pass the obstructive Inverness companies, there was a major problem: the Boat of Garten connection was at the whim of the I&PJR. (Indeed the southward conveyance of traffic was also subject to that company's pleasure.)

For some time the Speyside Railway – in reality the GNoSR – came no further south than Abernethy for three years, finally being connected at Boat of Garten on 1 August 1866.

== Absorption by the GNoSR ==
For some time the GNoSR had been supporting local railways financially, and in many cases working their trains for them. On 30 July 1866, the GNoSR obtained the Great North of Scotland Railway (Amalgamation) Act 1866 (29 & 30 Vict. c. cclxxxviii) authorising it to amalgamate with several associated railways, including the K&DR and the Strathspey Railway; this took place on 1 August 1866.

== Grouping, nationalisation and closure ==
The railways of Great Britain were grouped into one or other of four new large railway companies, following the Railways Act 1921. The process took place in 1923 and was referred to as the grouping and the GNoSR was a constituent of the new London and North Eastern Railway (LNER). This process was followed in 1948 by nationalisation of the railways, when the LNER and others were taken into British Railways. For some time as Fenwick comments, "this did not bring any immediate change in operations".

However mounting losses on the railways, as business transferred to road transport, were not sustainable, and the passenger service on the former Keith and Dufftown line closed on 6 May 1968. Ordinary goods traffic also declined, but Dufftown continued as a coal depot until 1971. A bulk grain terminal was set up there in 1966, but that traffic ended in the early 1980s. The line was disused for some years, being formally closed to goods traffic at the end of 1984.

An organisation called Grampian Railtours started operating charter passenger excursions from Aberdeen to Dufftown, visiting distilleries, from 1984 under the brand Northern Belle. These services ended and the line was formally closed on 1 April 1991.

== Heritage railway ==
In 1993 a heritage railway group, the Keith and Dufftown Railway Association (K&DRA) was launched, and in 1998 most of the route was transferred to it. Some train running took place in 2000 and on 18 August 2001 the first train ran throughout over the K&DRA track, between Keith Town and Dufftown. The system continues to run as a heritage railway.

== Current status ==
A short section between the National Rail Keith station and the Keith Town station is completely disused. The remainder of the route is used by the heritage operator, the Keith and Dufftown Railway.

== Locations ==
- Keith; GNoSR station on main line, opened 11 October 1856; renamed Keith Junction 1952/3; reverted to Keith 12 May 1980; still open;
- Earlsmill; opened 1 April 1862; renamed Keith Town 1 May 1897; closed 6 May 1968;
- Botriphnie; opened 21 February 1862; renamed Auchindachy October 1862; closed 6 May 1968;
- Towiemore; opened for distillery workers 9 June 1924; open to public July 1937; closed 6 May 1968;
- Drummuir; opened 21 February 1862; closed 6 May 1968;
- Parkmore Junction; branch to distilleries 1891 – 1966;
- Dufftown; opened 21 February 1862; closed 6 May 1968; end on junction to Strathspey Railway 1863 – 1971.
